= Bahama Banks =

Submerged carbonate platforms that make up much of the Bahama Archipelago

Coordinates: 24°02′47″N 77°39′05″W

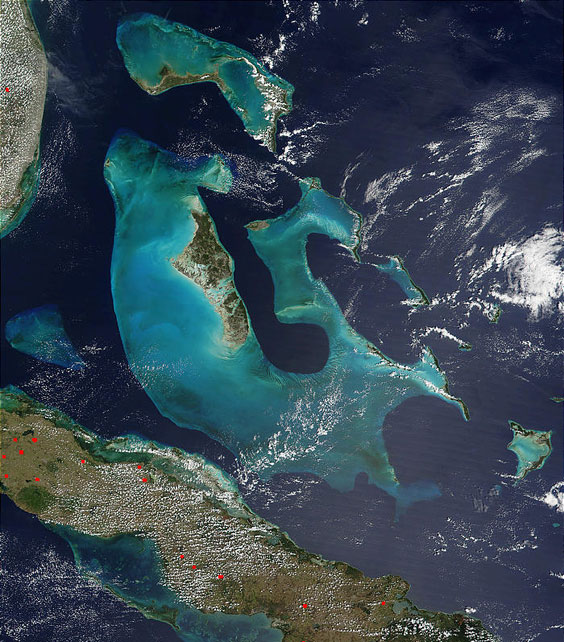
The Bahama Banks: Little Bahama Bank in the north, Great Bahama Bank in the south, and Cay Sal Bank in the west; and the Caicos Bank of the Turks and Caicos Islands in the east

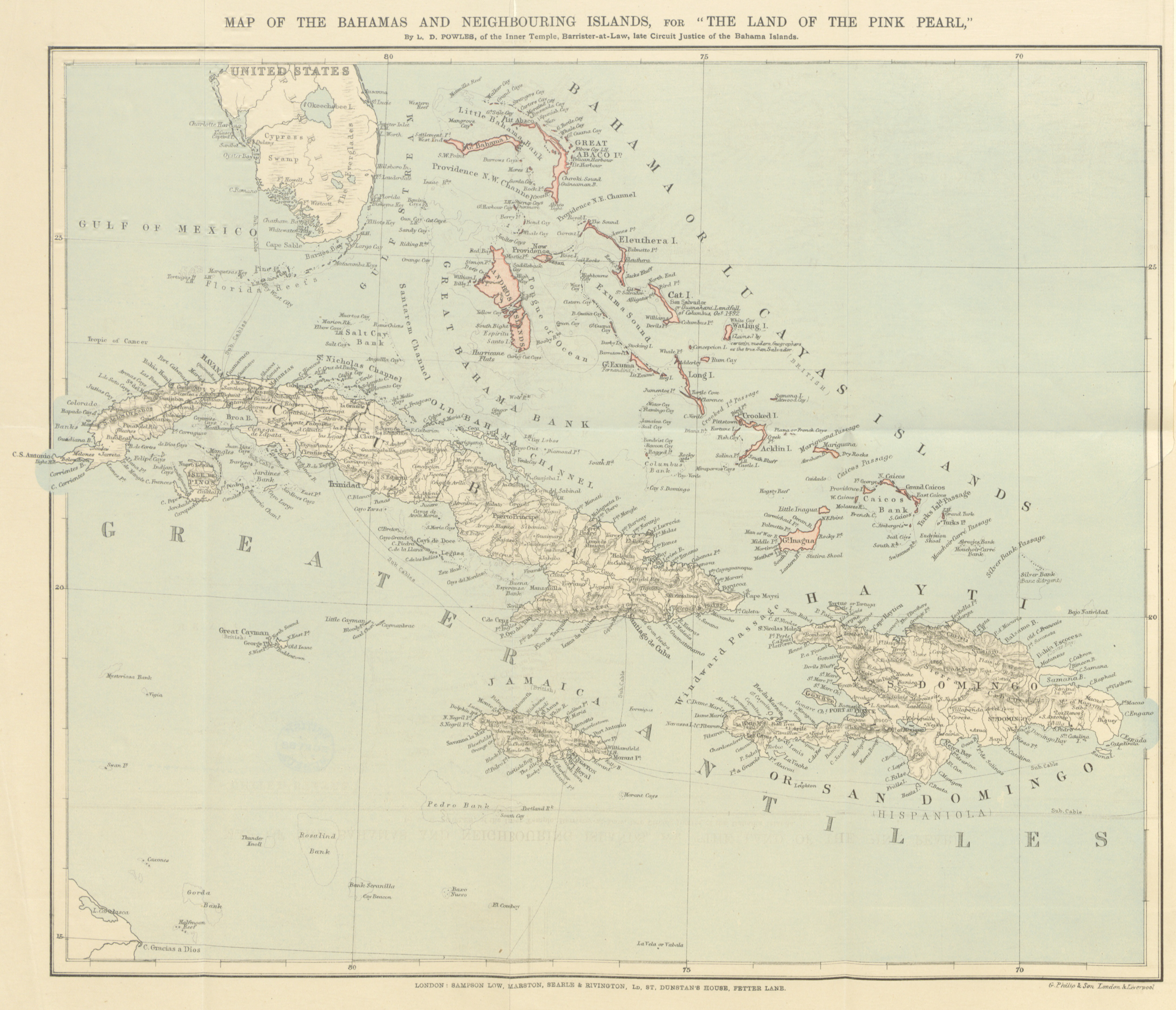
Map of 1888 showing the banks of the Lucayan Archipelago from Navidad Bank or Bajo Navidad north of the Dominican Republic in Hispaniola to Little Bahama Bank in The Bahamas

The Bahama Banks are the submerged carbonate platforms located in the archipelago of The Bahamas within the Lucayan Archipelago. The term is usually applied in referring to either the Great Bahama Bank around Andros Island, or the Little Bahama Bank of Grand Bahama Island and Great Abaco, which are the largest of the platforms, and the Cay Sal Bank. The three banks of the Turks and Caicos Islands, namely the Caicos Bank of the Caicos island group, the Turks Bank of the Turks island group, and the submerged Mouchoir Bank, and the two banks north of the Dominican Republic in Hispaniola, namely the submerged Silver Bank and Navidad Bank, are geographically and geologically part of the Lucayan Archipelago, which entire carbonate platform is often generally referred to as the Bahamas platform.

== Geologic history and structure ==
The limestone that comprises the Banks has been accumulating since at least the Cretaceous period, and perhaps as early as the Jurassic; today the total thickness under the Great Bahama Bank is over 4.5 kilometres (2.8 miles). As the limestone was deposited in shallow water, the only way to explain this massive column is to estimate that the entire platform has subsided under its own weight at a rate of roughly 3.6 centimetres (2 inches) per 1,000 years.

The waters of the Bahama Banks are very shallow; on the Great Bahama Bank they are generally no deeper than 25 meters (80 feet). The slopes around them however, such as the border of the Tongue of the Ocean in the Great Bahama Bank, are very steep. The Banks were dry land during past ice ages, when sea level was as much as 120 meters (390 feet) lower than at present; the land area of the Bahamas today thus represents only a small fraction of their prehistoric extent. When they were exposed to the atmosphere, the limestone structure was subjected to chemical weathering that created the caves and sinkholes common to karst terrain, resulting in structures like blue holes.

== See also ==
- Oolitic Aragonite Sand - largest deposit of oolitic aragonite sand is found on the Bahamas Banks
- Dean's Blue Hole – Deep water-filled sinkhole in the Bahamas
- Geography of the Bahamas
- Ocean bank – Part of the sea which is shallow compared to its surrounding area
