= God Bless Our Sunny Clime =

National song of the Bahamas

"God Bless our Sunny Clime" is the national song of The Commonwealth of the Bahamas. Its music was composed by Timothy Gibson (composer and teacher) and E. Clement Bethel (composer, and Director of Culture of the Bahamas). The lyrics were written by the Rev. Philip Rahming, a Baptist minister and lecturer at the College of the Bahamas.

It should not be confused with the country's national anthem, "March On, Bahamaland", nor with the royal anthem, "God Save the King".

== History ==
"God Bless our Sunny Clime" came about in preparation for the Colony of the Bahamas to gain their independence. The government held a competition to decide what would be the new national anthem to replace the British national anthem "God Save the Queen". "God Bless our Sunny Clime" was one of the entrants to the contest. Whilst "March on, Bahamaland" was selected as the winner and would become the official anthem for the new Commonwealth of the Bahamas, "God Bless our Sunny Clime" came in second in the contest and it was decided by the government that it would be adopted as the Bahamas' national song. "God Save the Queen" would be retained solely as the Royal anthem of the Bahamas.

In 2019, Gibson and Rahming were both awarded with the Order of the Bahamas (Gibson posthumously) as recognition for their work in designing the Bahamas' national symbols, including for "God Bless our Sunny Clime" as the national song. It is often performed at Majority Rule Day public commemorations on that holiday. It is also performed at church services of thanksgiving on the Bahamas Independence Day.

== Lyrics ==
God Bless our sunny clime spur us to height
sublime to keep men free let brothers sisters stand
Firm trusting hand in hand throughout Bahamaland
One brotherhood, one brotherhood.

Let gratefulness ascend, courageous deeds extend
From isle to isle. Long let us treasure peace,
So may our lives increase, our prayers never cease.
Let freedom ring! Let freedom ring!

The long, long night has passed, the morning breaks at last,
From shore to shore, sunrise with golden gleam
Sons n' daughters, share the dream, for one working team
One brotherhood, one brotherhood.

Not for this time nor for this chosen few alone
We pledge ourselves. Live loyal to our God.
Love country, friend and foe, oh help us by thy might!
Great God our King! Great God Our King!
