= March On, Bahamaland =

National anthem of The Bahamas

- National anthem of The Bahamas
- Lyrics: Timothy Gibson, 1973
- Music: Timothy Gibson, 1973
- Adopted: 10 July 1973; 52 years ago

Audio sample
- U.S. Navy Band instrumental version: file; help

"March On, Bahamaland" is the national anthem of The Bahamas. Timothy Gibson composed the music and authored the lyrics. It was adopted as the national anthem in 1973, when the country gained independence from the United Kingdom.

== History ==
The Bahamas became a crown colony within the British Empire in 1717. Internal autonomy was eventually granted to the islands in 1964. Negotiations on independence commenced eight years later, when the Progressive Liberal Party emerged victorious in the 1972 elections after campaigning in favour of sovereignty. Consequently, a contest was held to determine a composition for a forthcoming national anthem.

In the end, lyrics and music written by Timothy Gibson were selected. Gibson was a school music teacher and also wrote the music to the country's national song, "God Bless Our Sunny Clime", together with E. Clement Bethel. The song was officially adopted in 1973, the year the country gained independence. One of the first public occasions where the anthem was played was at the midnight flag hoisting ceremony held at Clifford Park in Nassau on 10 July 1973, marking the end of British rule over the Bahamas.

Since the Bahamas continued to be a Commonwealth realm after independence, "God Save the Queen" was retained as the country's royal anthem. That anthem was twice played by mistake at the 1982 Commonwealth Games medal ceremony, when Shonel Ferguson won gold in women's long jump. She stepped off the podium on each occasion and expressed her wish that "March On, Bahamaland" be played. The officials realized that they did not have a recording of that song, so the Bahamian delegation sang their anthem themselves.

== Lyrics ==
Lift up your head to the rising sun, Bahamaland;
March on to glory, your bright banners waving high.
See how the world marks the manner of your bearing!
Pledge to excel through love and unity.

Pressing onward, march together
to a common loftier goal;
Steady sunward, tho' the weather
hide the wide and treacherous shoal.

Lift up your head to the rising sun, Bahamaland,
'Til the road you've trod lead unto your God,

MARCH ON, BAHAMALAND!
