= Nicolette Bethel =

Bahamian teacher, writer and anthropologist

- Born: Nassau, Bahamas
- Education: Trinity College, University of Toronto; Corpus Christi College, Cambridge
- Occupations: Teacher, writer nd anthropologist
- Employer: University of the Bahamas
- Father: E. Clement Bethel
- Website: nicobethel.com

Nicolette Bethel is a Bahamian teacher, writer and anthropologist. She was the Director of Culture in The Bahamas, and is now a full-time lecturer in the School of Social Sciences at the University of the Bahamas.

== Education ==
Born and raised in Nassau, Bahamas, Nicolette Bethel studied at Trinity College in the University of Toronto and at Corpus Christi College, Cambridge, where she earned a PhD in Social Anthropology in 2000.

== Career ==
While she has published several poems and short stories, and co-written and co-produced several plays for theatres of the Bahamas, Bethel is arguably best known as an expert for Junkanoo, a Bahamian festival at Christmas.

She is also the editor and expander of the book on the festival by her father, E. Clement Bethel: Junkanoo: Festival of The Bahamas (Macmillan Caribbean, 1992, ISBN 0-333-55469-8).

=== "We The People" and Bethel's patriotism ===
First established on November 16, 2010, "We The People" is a non-profit organization led by Ed Fields and a group of people from The Bahamas commonly known as the "First Thirty". The main incentive of this organization is to create positive change and improvement in The Bahamas. Becoming a member of "We The People" is simple as it is "open to students, academia, business professionals, retired public officials, other institutions and associations, the general public, and anyone who loves The Bahamas". Bethel's love for The Bahamas and patriotism made "We The People" an appealing way for her to help support and create change in her country.

Bethel is a part of We The People's "First Thirty". Her strong belief in the idea that the Bahamians can work together to create a major change without the help of external powers drove her to join and be a main contributor, and leader, for We The People. Bethel firmly believes that due to the size of The Bahamas, creating change can be achieved "in the blink of an eye". Along with the other 29 members comprising the "First Thirty", Bethel aims to eradicate all the negative aspects of life in The Bahamas in order to create a stable and harmonious living society.
