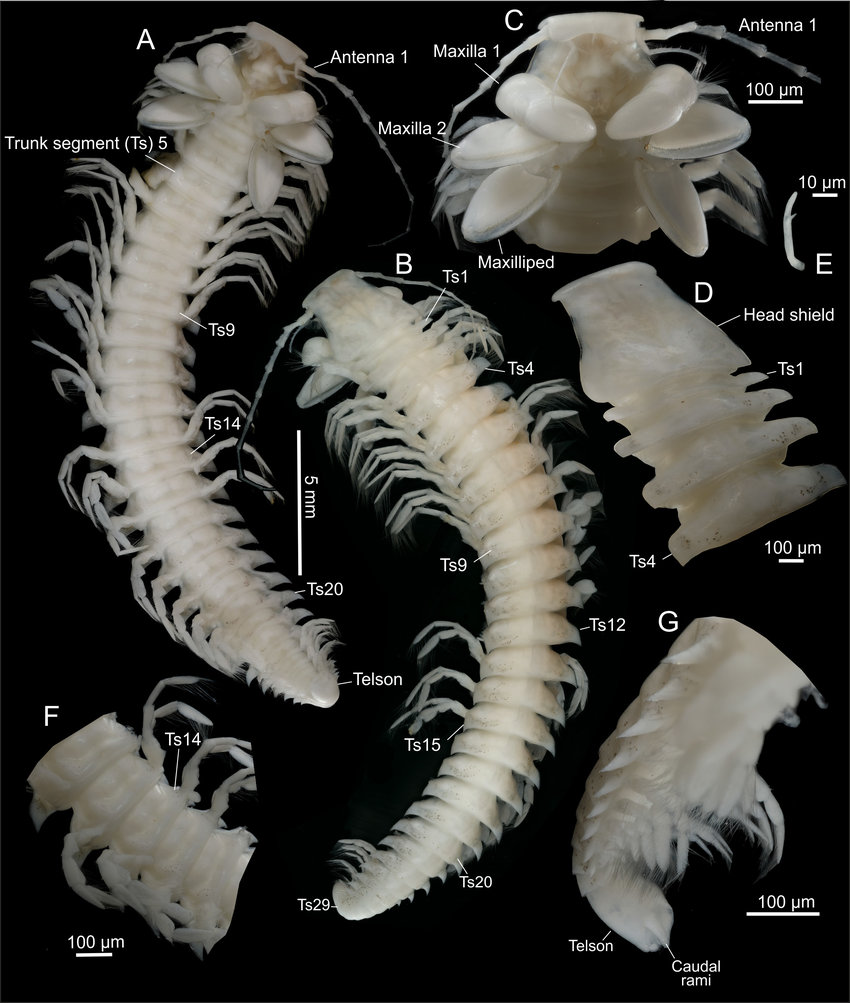
- Holotype of Godzillius louriei

Scientific classification
- Kingdom: Animalia
- Phylum: Arthropoda
- Class: Remipedia
- Order: Nectiopoda
- Family: Godzilliidae
- Genus: Godzillius
- Species: G. louriei

Binomial name
- Godzillius louriei Ballou, Bracken-Grissom & Olesen, 2021

= Godzillius louriei =

Species of crustacean

Godzillius louriei is a species of remipede in the genus Godzillius. It was discovered in the Lucayan Archipelago in 2021.
