= The Bahamas =

Country of islands in the Caribbean

Commonwealth of The Bahamas
- Flag Coat of arms
- Motto: "Forward, Upward, Onward, Together"
- Anthem: "March On, Bahamaland" Royal anthem: "God Save the King"
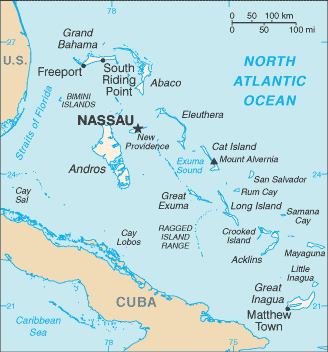
- Capital and largest city: Nassau; 25°04′41″N 77°20′19″W
- Official languages: English
- Recognised national languages: Bahamian Creole
- Ethnic groups (2020): 90.6% Afro-Caribbean; 4.7% White; 2.1% mixed; 1.9% other; 0.7% unspecified
- Religion (2022): 87.9% Christianity; 75.1% Protestantism; 8.7% Roman Catholic; 1.2% other Christian; 6.3% no religion; 1.0% other; 4.8% undeclared/unknown
- Demonym: Bahamian
- Government: Unitary parliamentary constitutional monarchy
  - Monarch: Charles III
  - Governor-General: Dame Cynthia A. Pratt
  - Prime Minister: Philip Davis
- Legislature: Parliament
  - Upper house: Senate
  - Lower house: House of Assembly

Independence from the United Kingdom
  - Realm: 10 July 1973

Area
  - Total: 13,880 km^{2} (5,360 sq mi) (156th)
  - Water (%): 28%

Population
  - 2022 census: ▲398,165 (171st)
  - Density: 39.8/km^{2} (103.1/sq mi) (181st)
- GDP (PPP): 2024 estimate
  - Total: ▲$18.989 billion (153rd)
  - Per capita: ▲$46,524 (46th)
- GDP (nominal): 2024 estimate
  - Total: ▲$14.390 billion (146th)
  - Per capita: ▲$35,257 (29th)
- HDI (2023): 0.820 very high (66th)
- Currency: Bahamian dollar (BSD)
- Time zone: UTC−05:00 (EST)
  - Summer (DST): UTC−04:00 (EDT)
- Date format: dd.mm.yyyy (CE)
- Calling code: +1
- ISO 3166 code: BS
- Internet TLD: .bs

The Bahamas, (Note: /bə.ˈhɑː.məz/, bə-HAH-məz) officially the Commonwealth of The Bahamas, is an archipelagic country in the Caribbean located within the Lucayan Archipelago in the Atlantic Ocean. The country comprises 700 islands, and more than 2,500 cays in the Atlantic Ocean, located north of Cuba and north-west of the island of Hispaniola (split between the Dominican Republic and Haiti) and the Turks and Caicos Islands, southeast of the US state of Florida and east of the Florida Keys. The capital and largest city is Nassau on the island of New Providence. The Royal Bahamas Defence Force describes the Bahamas' territory as encompassing 470,000 km^{2} (180,000 sq mi) of ocean space.

The Bahama islands were inhabited by the Arawak and Lucayans, a branch of the Arawakan-speaking Taíno, for many centuries. Christopher Columbus was the first European to see the islands, making his first landfall in the New World in 1492 when he landed on the island of San Salvador (which the Lucayans called Guanahaní). Later, the Kingdom of Spain shipped the native Lucayans to Hispaniola and enslaved them there, leaving the Bahama islands mostly deserted from 1513 until 1648. In 1649, English colonists from Bermuda, known as the Eleutheran Adventurers, settled on the island of Eleuthera.

The Bahamas became a crown colony of the Kingdom of Great Britain in 1718 when the British clamped down on piracy. After the American Revolutionary War, the Crown resettled thousands of American Loyalists to the Bahamas; they took slaves with them and established plantations on land grants. African slaves and their descendants constituted the majority of the population from this period on. The slave trade was abolished by the British in 1807. Slavery in the Bahamas was not abolished until 1834, but in 1818 the Bahamas became a haven of manumission for African slaves from outside the British West Indies. Africans liberated from illegal slave ships were resettled on the islands by the Royal Navy, while some North American slaves and Seminoles escaped to the Bahamas from Florida. During this period, Bahamians were known to recognise the freedom of slaves carried by the ships of other nations which reached their country. Today Black Bahamians make up 90 per cent of the population of 400,516.

The Bahamas became an independent Commonwealth realm separate from the United Kingdom in 1973. Its first prime minister was Lynden Pindling. The Bahamas maintains King Charles III as its monarch; the appointed representative of the Crown is the governor-general of the Bahamas. The Bahamas has the fourteenth-largest gross domestic product per capita in the Americas. Its economy is based on tourism and offshore finance. Though the Bahamas is in the Lucayan Archipelago, and not in the Caribbean Sea, it is still considered part of the wider Caribbean region. The Bahamas is a full member of the Caribbean Community (CARICOM), but is not part of the CARICOM Single Market and Economy.

== Naming and etymology ==
The name Bahamas is derived from the Lucayan name Bahama ('large upper middle island'), used by the Indigenous Lucayan people for the island of Grand Bahama. Bahama referred to Grand Bahama alone when first attested on the c. 1523 Turin Map, but was used in English for the archipelago as a whole by 1670.

Tourist guides often state that the name comes from the Spanish baja mar ('shallow sea'). Wolfgang Ahrens of York University argues that this is a folk etymology. Alternatively, Bahama may have been derived from Guanahaní, a local name of unclear meaning. Isaac Taylor, a toponymist, argues that the name was derived from Bimani (Bimini), which Spaniards in Haiti identified with Palombe, a legendary place where John Mandeville's Travels said there was a fountain of youth.

The Bahamas is one of two countries whose official short name starts with the definite article, the other being The Gambia.

== History ==
=== Pre-Hispanic era ===
The first inhabitants of the Bahamas were Indigenous people Taíno, who moved into the uninhabited southern islands from Hispaniola and Cuba sometime between AD 500 and 800, having migrated there from mainland South America; they came to be known as the Lucayan people. An estimated 30,000 Lucayans inhabited the Bahamas at the time of Christopher Columbus' arrival in 1492.

=== Arrival of the Spanish ===
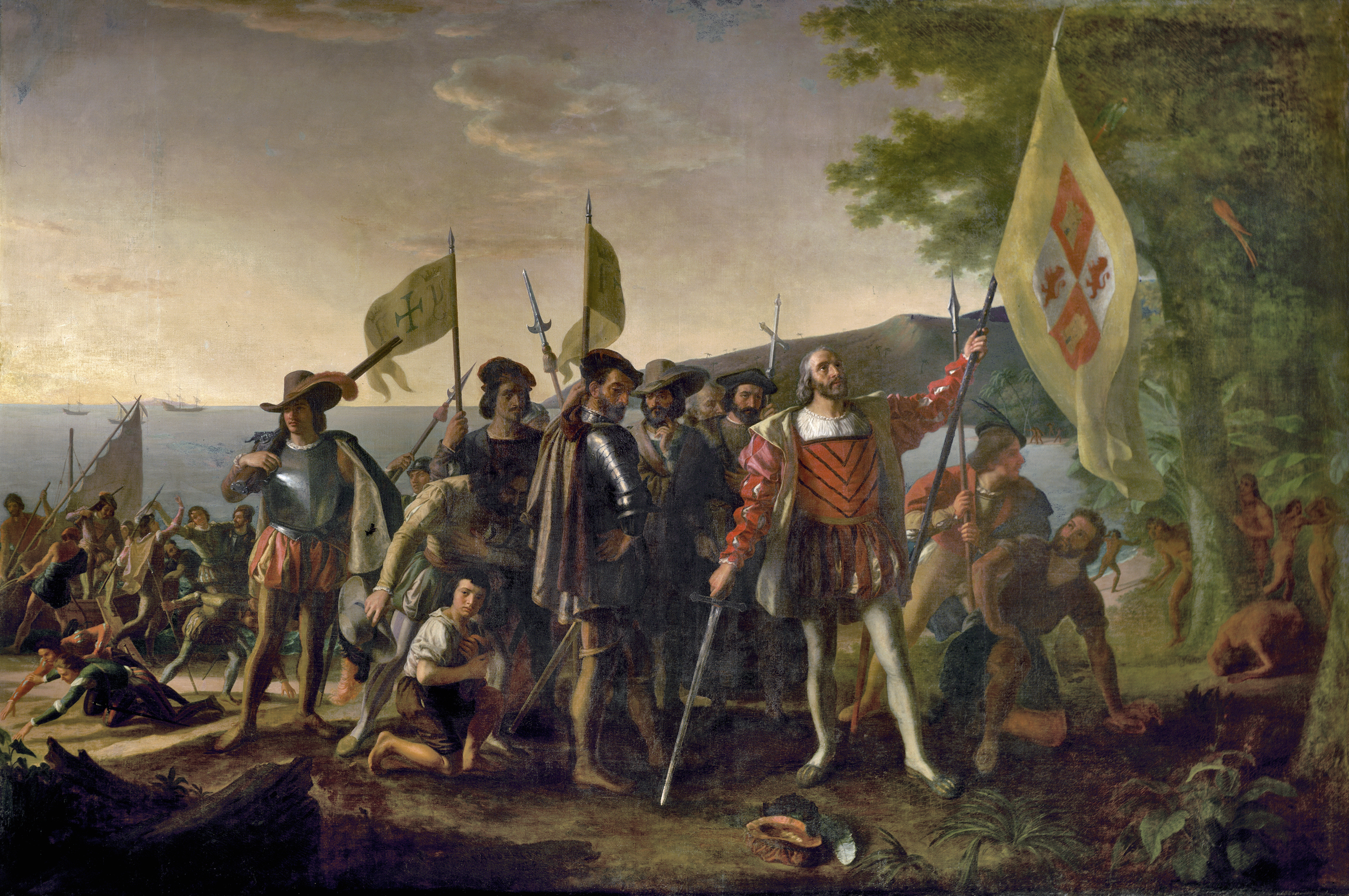
Landing of Columbus by John Vanderlyn, 1847. A depiction of Columbus' first landing, claiming possession of the New World for the Crown of Castile in caravels; the Niña and the Pinta, on Watling Island, an island of the Bahamas that the natives called Guanahani and that he named San Salvador, on 12 October 1492.

Columbus' first landfall in what was to Europeans a "New World" was on an island he named San Salvador (known to the Lucayans as Guanahani). While there is a general consensus that this island lay within the Bahamas, precisely which island Columbus landed on is a matter of scholarly debate. Some researchers believe the site to be present-day San Salvador Island (formerly known as Watling's Island), situated in the southeastern Bahamas, whilst an alternative theory holds that Columbus landed to the southeast on Samana Cay, according to calculations made in 1986 by National Geographic writer and editor Joseph Judge, based on Columbus' log. On the landfall island, Columbus made first contact with the Lucayans and exchanged goods with them, claiming the islands for the Crown of Castile, before proceeding to explore the larger isles of the Greater Antilles.

The 1494 Treaty of Tordesillas theoretically divided the new territories between the Kingdom of Castile and the Kingdom of Portugal, placing the Bahamas in the Spanish sphere; however, they did little to press their claim on the ground. The Spanish did, however, exploit the Native Lucayan peoples, many of whom were enslaved and sent to Hispaniola for use as forced labour. The slaves suffered harsh conditions and most died from contracting diseases to which they had no immunity; half of the Lucayans died from smallpox alone. As a result of these depredations the population of the Bahamas was severely diminished.

=== Arrival of the English ===
The English had expressed an interest in the Bahamas as early as 1629. However, it was not until 1648 that the first English settlers arrived on the islands. Known as the Eleutherian Adventurers and led by William Sayle, they migrated from Bermuda seeking greater religious freedom. These English Puritans established the first permanent European settlement on an island which they named Eleuthera, Greek for free. They later settled New Providence, naming it Sayle's Island. Life proved harder than envisaged however, and many – including Sayle – chose to return to Bermuda. To survive, the remaining settlers salvaged goods from wrecks.

In 1670 King Charles II granted the islands to the Lords Proprietors of the Carolinas in North America. They rented the islands from the king with rights of trading, tax, appointing governors, and administering the country from their base on New Providence. Piracy and attacks from hostile foreign powers were a constant threat. In 1684 the Spanish corsair Juan de Alcon raided the capital Charles Town (later renamed Nassau), and in 1703 a joint Franco-Spanish expedition briefly occupied Nassau during the War of the Spanish Succession.

=== 18th century ===
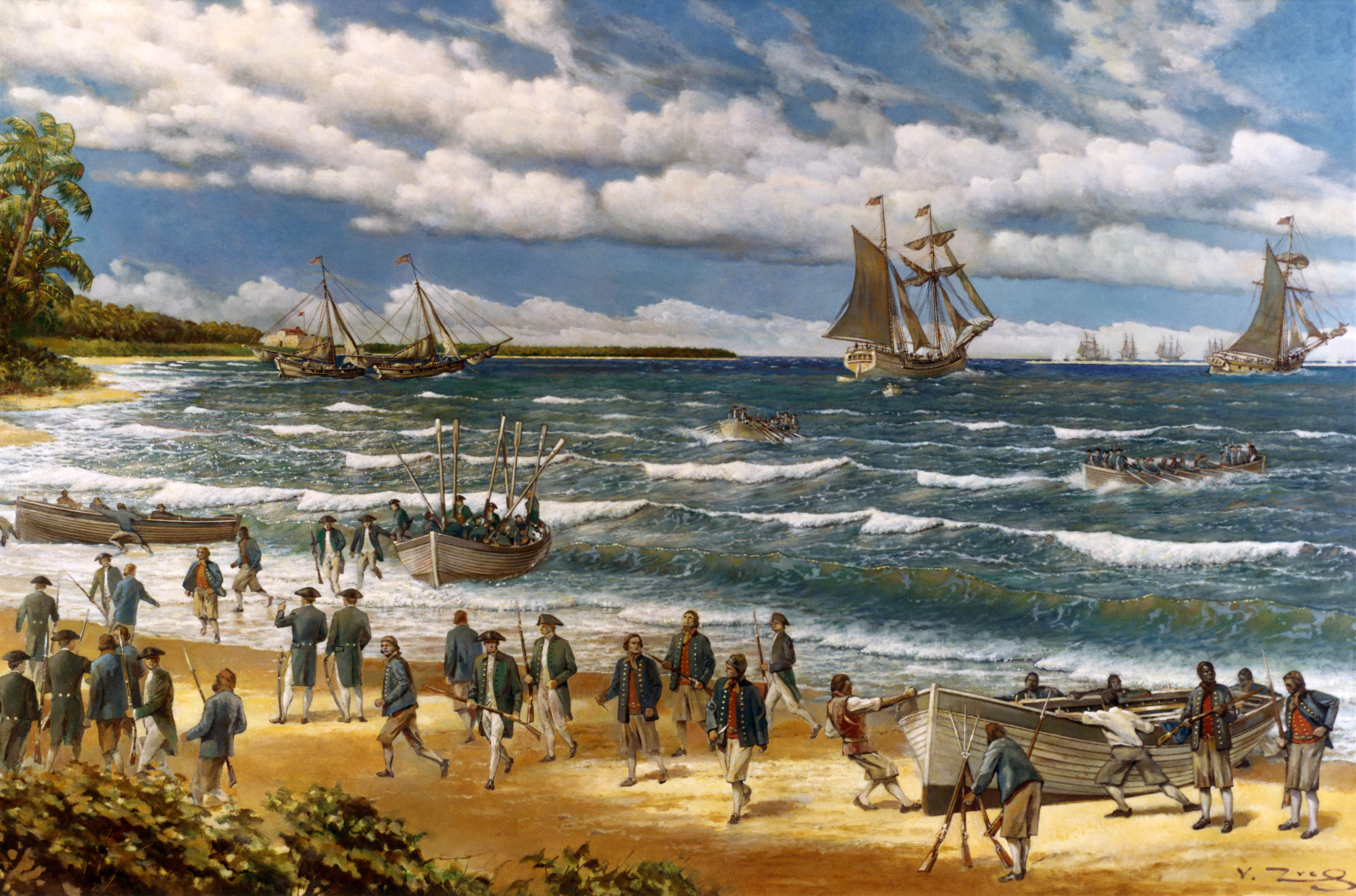
Continental Marines land at New Providence during the Battle of Nassau in 1776

During proprietary rule the Bahamas became a haven for pirates, including Blackbeard (circa 1680–1718). To put an end to the "Pirates' republic" and restore orderly government, Britain made the Bahamas a crown colony in 1718, which they dubbed "the Bahama islands" under the governorship of Woodes Rogers. After a difficult struggle he succeeded in suppressing piracy. In 1720 the Spanish attacked Nassau during the War of the Quadruple Alliance, but were repelled. In 1729 a local assembly was established giving a degree of self-governance for British settlers. The reforms had been planned by the previous Governor George Phenney and authorised in July 1728.

During the American War of Independence in the late 18th century, the islands became a target for US naval forces. Under the command of Commodore Esek Hopkins, US Marines, the US Navy occupied Nassau in 1776, before being evacuated a single day later. In 1782, a Spanish fleet appeared off the coast of Nassau, and the city surrendered without a fight. During the preliminary arrangements for the Treaty of Paris (1783), a settlement was established whereby, the Bahamas, were to be returned to Britain in exchange for East Florida. Before this took place however, a British-American Loyalist expedition led by Colonel Andrew Deveaux, recaptured the islands from the Spanish in April 1783.

After US independence, the British resettled some 7,300 Loyalists with their African slaves in the Bahamas, including 2,000 from New York and at least 1,033 Europeans, 2,214 African descendants, and a few Native American Creeks from East Florida. Most of the refugees resettled from New York had fled from other colonies, including West Florida, which the Spanish captured during the war. The government granted land to the planters to help compensate for losses on the continent. These Loyalists, who included Deveaux and also Lord Dunmore, established plantations on several islands and became a political force in the capital. European Americans were outnumbered by the African-American slaves they brought with them, and ethnic Europeans remained a minority in the territory.

=== 19th century ===
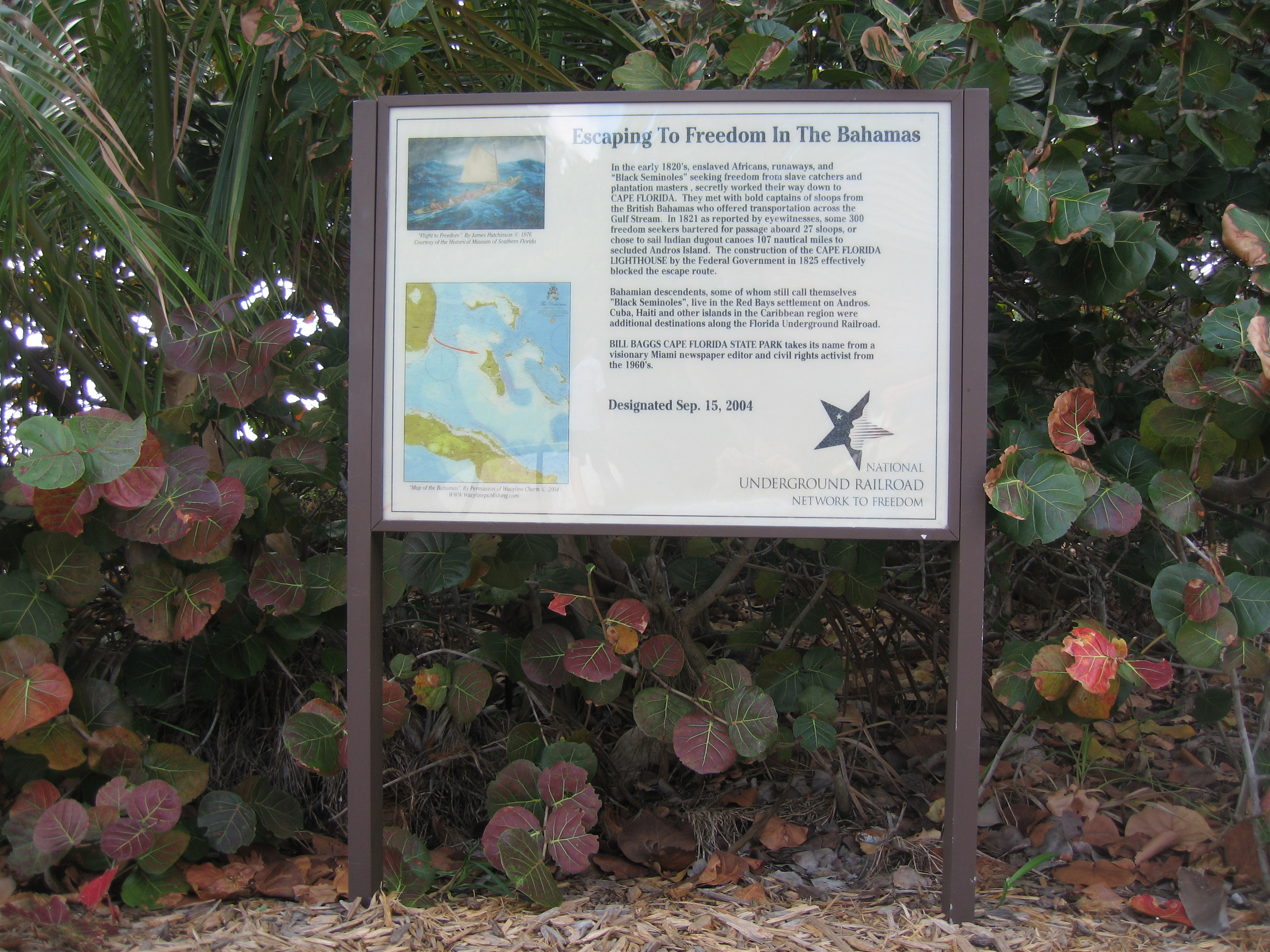
Sign at Bill Baggs Cape Florida State Park commemorating hundreds of African-American slaves who escaped to freedom in the early 1820s in the Bahamas

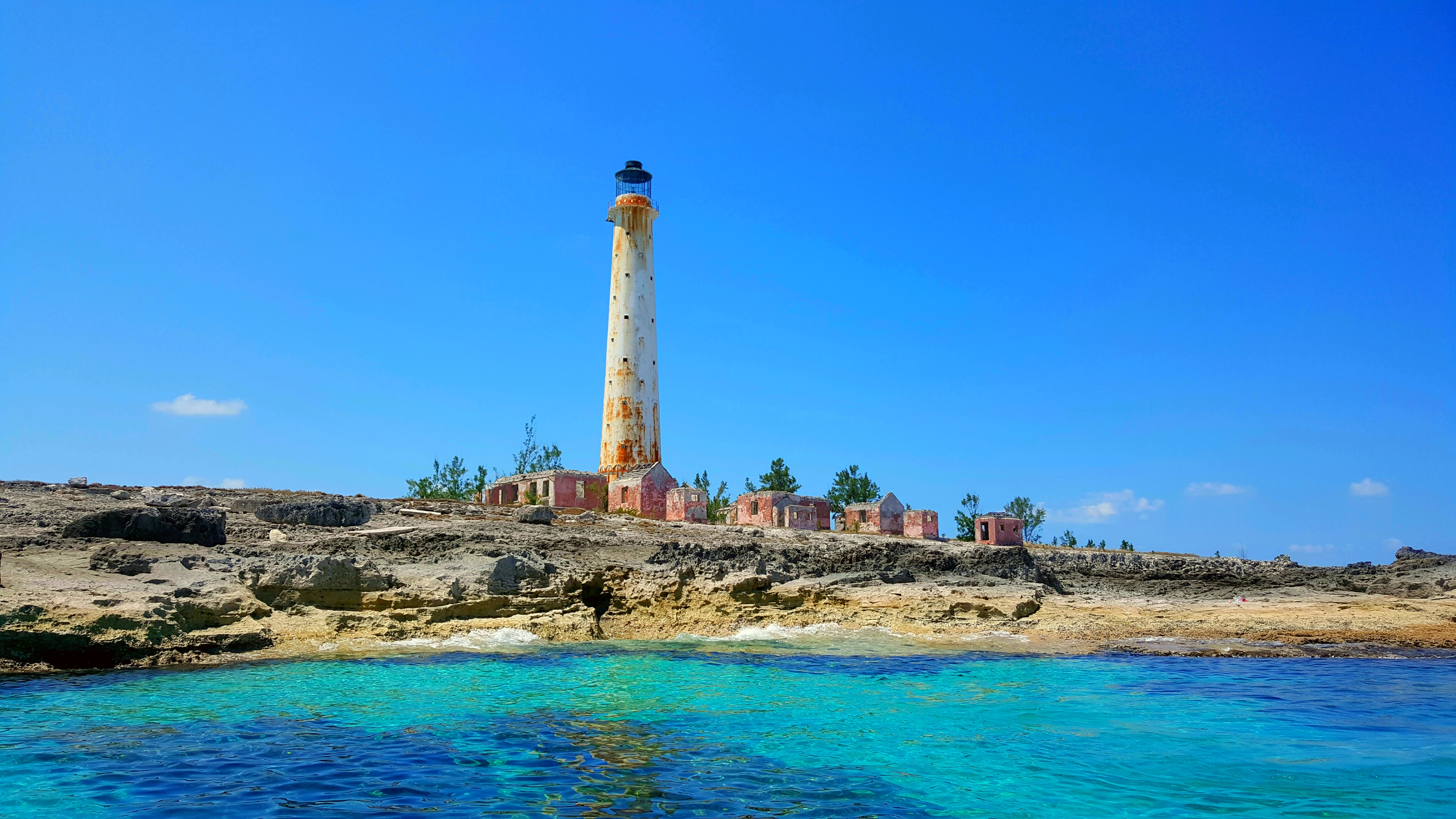
The lighthouse in Great Isaac Cay

The Slave Trade Act 1807 abolished slave trading to British possessions, including the Bahamas. The United Kingdom pressured other slave-trading countries to also abolish slave-trading, and gave the Royal Navy the right to intercept ships carrying slaves on the high seas. Thousands of Africans liberated from slave ships by the Royal Navy were resettled in the Bahamas.

In the 1820s during the period of the Seminole Wars in Florida, hundreds of North American slaves and African Seminoles escaped from Cape Florida to the Bahamas. They settled mostly on northwest Andros Island, where they developed the village of Red Bays. From eyewitness accounts, 300 escaped in a mass flight in 1823, aided by Bahamians in 27 sloops, with others using canoes for the journey. This was commemorated in 2004 by a large sign at Bill Baggs Cape Florida State Park. Some of their descendants in Red Bays continue African Seminole traditions in basket making and grave marking.

In 1818 the Home Office ruled that "any slave brought to the Bahamas from outside the British West Indies would be manumitted." This led to a total of nearly 300 enslaved people owned by US nationals being freed from 1830 to 1835. The American slave ships Comet and Encomium used in the United States domestic coastwise slave trade, were wrecked off Abaco Island in December 1830 and February 1834, respectively. When wreckers took the masters, passengers and slaves into Nassau, customs officers seized the slaves and British colonial officials freed them, over the protests of the Americans. There were 165 slaves on the Comet and 48 on the Encomium. The United Kingdom finally paid an indemnity to the United States in those two cases in 1855, under the Treaty of Claims of 1853, which settled several compensation cases between the two countries.

Slavery was abolished in the British Empire on 1 August 1834. After that British colonial officials freed 78 North American slaves from the Enterprise, which went into Bermuda in 1835; and 38 from the Hermosa, which wrecked off Abaco Island in 1840. The most notable case was that of the Creole in 1841: as a result of a slave revolt on board, the leaders ordered the US brig to Nassau. It was carrying 135 slaves from Virginia destined for sale in New Orleans. The Bahamian officials freed the 128 slaves who chose to stay in the islands. The Creole case has been described as the "most successful slave revolt in U.S. history".

These incidents, in which a total of 447 enslaved people belonging to US nationals were freed from 1830 to 1842, increased tension between the United States and the United Kingdom. They had been co-operating in patrols to suppress the international slave trade. However, worried about the stability of its large domestic slave trade and its value, the United States argued that the United Kingdom should not treat its domestic ships that came to its colonial ports under duress as part of the international trade. The United States worried that the success of the Creole slaves in gaining freedom would encourage more slave revolts on merchant ships.

During the American Civil War of the 1860s, the islands briefly prospered as a focus for blockade runners aiding the Confederate States.

=== Early 20th century ===
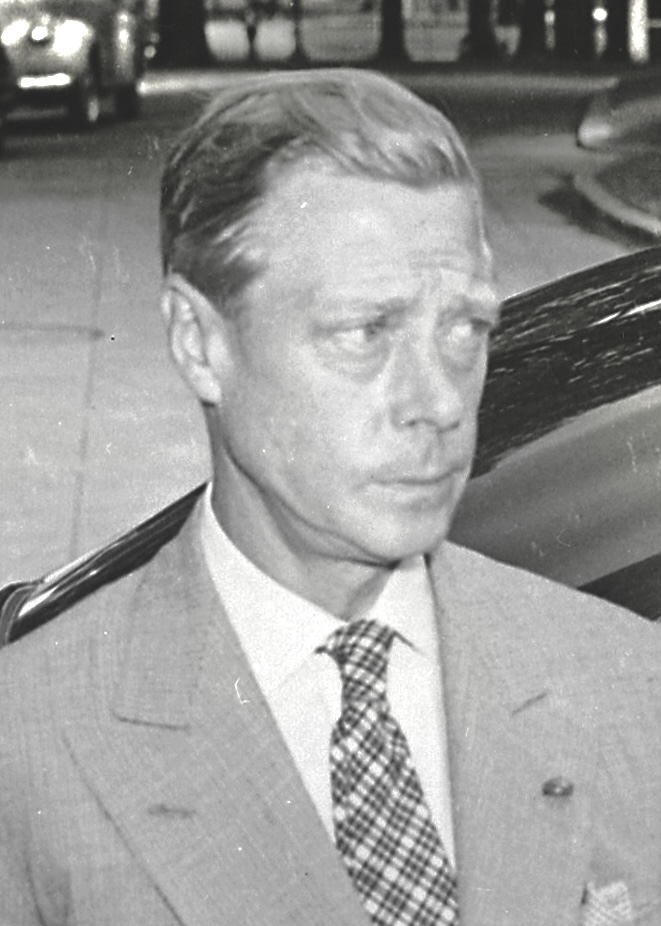
The Duke of Windsor and Governor of the Bahamas from 1940 to 1945

The early decades of the 20th century were ones of hardship for many Bahamians, characterised by a stagnant economy and widespread poverty. Many eked out a living via subsistence agriculture or fishing.

In August 1940 the Duke of Windsor (formerly King Edward VIII) was appointed Governor of the Bahamas. He arrived in the colony with his wife, Wallis, Duchess of Windsor. Although disheartened at the condition of Government House, they "tried to make the best of a bad situation". He did not enjoy the position, and referred to the islands as "a third-class British colony". He opened the small local parliament on 29 October 1940. The couple visited the "Out Islands" that November, on Axel Wenner-Gren's yacht, which caused controversy; the British Foreign Office strenuously objected because they had been advised by United States intelligence that Wenner-Gren was a close friend of the Luftwaffe commander Hermann Göring of Nazi Germany.

The Duke was praised at the time for his efforts to combat poverty on the islands. A 1991 biography by Philip Ziegler, however, described him as contemptuous of the Bahamians and other non-European peoples of the Empire. He was praised for his resolution of civil unrest over low wages in Nassau in June 1942, when there was a "full-scale riot". Ziegler said that the Duke blamed the trouble on "mischief makers – communists" and "men of Central European Jewish descent, who had secured jobs as a pretext for obtaining a deferment of draft". The Duke resigned from the post on 16 March 1945.

=== Post-Second World War ===
The Bahamas was a Crown colony until it gained independence in 1973.

Modern political development began after the Second World War. The first political parties were formed in the 1950s, split broadly along ethnic lines, with the United Bahamian Party (UBP) representing the English-descended Bahamians (known informally as the "Bay Street Boys") and the Progressive Liberal Party (PLP) representing the Black-Bahamian majority.

A new constitution granting the Bahamas internal autonomy went into effect on 7 January 1964, with Chief Minister Sir Roland Symonette of the UBP becoming the first premier. In 1967 Sir Lynden Pindling of the PLP became the first black premier of the Bahamian colony; in 1968 the title of the position was changed to prime minister. In 1968 Pindling announced that the Bahamas would seek full independence. A new constitution giving the Bahamas increased control over its own affairs was adopted in 1968. In 1971, the UBP merged with a disaffected faction of the PLP to form a new party, the Free National Movement (FNM), a centre-right party which aimed to counter the growing power of Pindling's PLP.

Her Majesty's Government gave the Bahamas its independence by an Order in Council dated 20 June 1973. The Order came into force on 10 July 1973, on which date Charles, Prince of Wales, delivered the official documents to Pindling, the prime minister. July 10 is now celebrated as Independence Day. It joined the Commonwealth of Nations on the same day. Sir Milo Butler was appointed the first governor-general of the Bahamas (the official representative of Queen Elizabeth II) shortly after independence.

=== Post-independence ===
Shortly after independence, the Bahamas joined the International Monetary Fund and the World Bank on 22 August 1973, and later the United Nations on 18 September 1973.

Politically, the first two decades were dominated by Pindling's PLP, who went on to win a string of electoral victories. Allegations of corruption, links with drug cartels and financial malfeasance within the Bahamian government failed to dent Pindling's popularity. Meanwhile, the economy underwent a dramatic growth period fuelled by the twin pillars of tourism and offshore finance, significantly raising the standard of living on the islands. The Bahamas' booming economy led to it becoming a beacon for immigrants, most notably from Haiti.

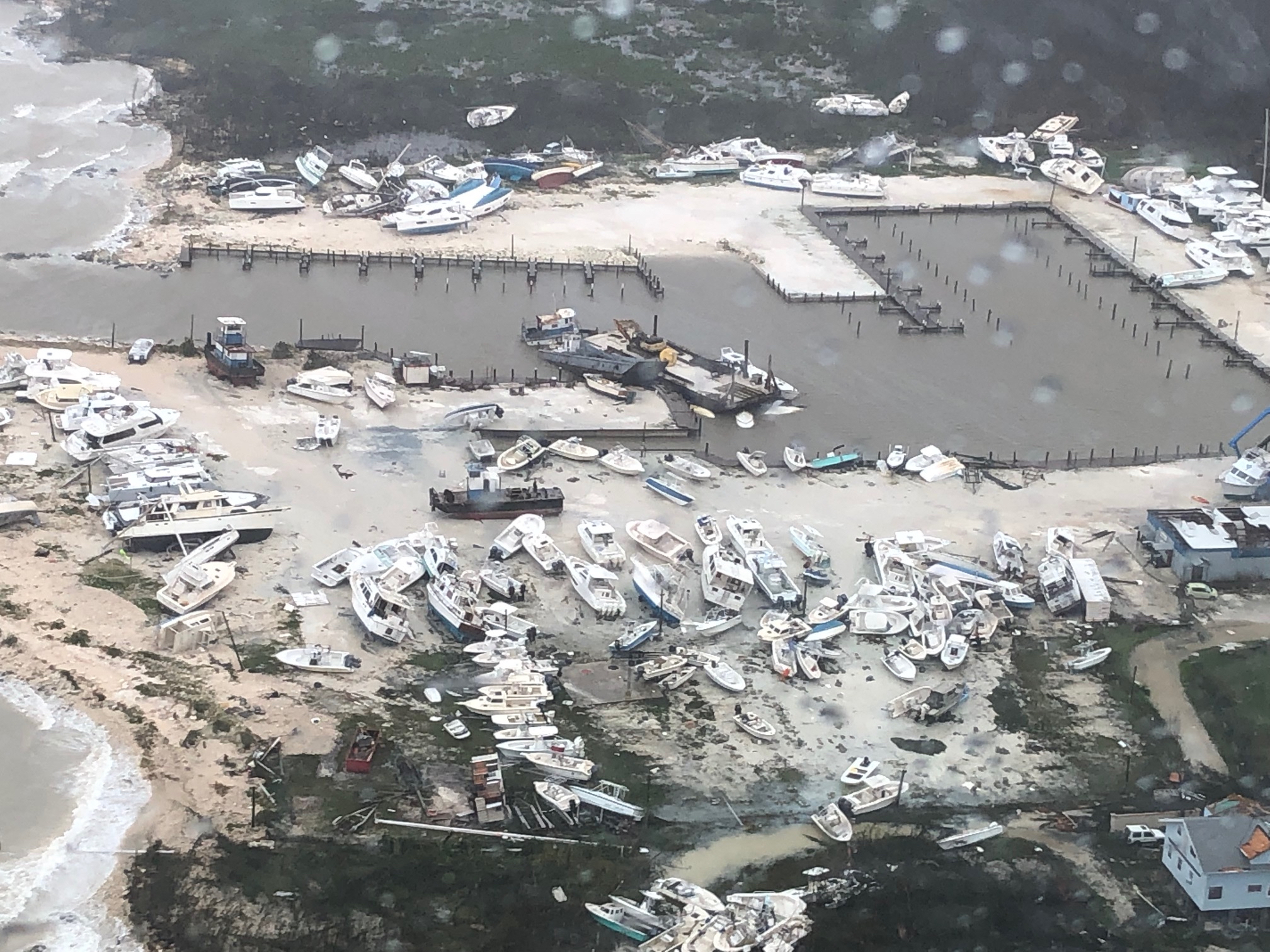
Hurricane Dorian's destruction in the Bahamas

In 1992, Pindling was unseated by Hubert Ingraham of the FNM. Ingraham went on to win the 1997 Bahamian general election, before being defeated in 2002, when the PLP returned to power under Perry Christie. Ingraham returned to power from 2007 to 2012, followed by Christie again from 2012 to 2017. With economic growth faltering, Bahamians re-elected the FNM in 2017, with Hubert Minnis becoming the fourth prime minister.

In September 2019, Hurricane Dorian struck the Abaco Islands and Grand Bahama at Category 5 intensity, devastating the northwestern Bahamas. The storm inflicted at least US$7 billion in damages and killed more than 50 people, with 1,300 people missing after two weeks.

The COVID-19 pandemic reached the Bahamas on 15 March 2020.

At the 2021 general election the governing Free National Movement (FNM) lost to the opposition Progressive Liberal Party (PLP) as the economy struggled to recover from its deepest crash since at least 1971. On 17 September 2021 the chairman of the PLP, Phillip Davis, was sworn in as the new prime minister, succeeding Hubert Minnis.

== Geography ==
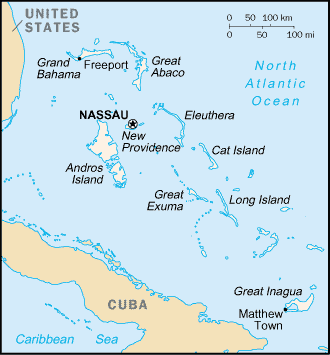
Map of the Bahamas

The Bahamas consists of a chain of islands spread out over some 800 km (500 mi) in the Atlantic Ocean, located to the east of Florida in the United States, north of Cuba and Hispaniola and west of the British Overseas Territory of the Turks and Caicos Islands (with which it forms the Lucayan archipelago). It lies between latitudes 20° and 28°N, and longitudes 72° and 80°W and straddles the Tropic of Cancer. There are some 700 islands and 2,400 cays in total (of which 30 are inhabited) with a total land area of 10,010 km^{2} (3,860 sq mi).

Nassau, the capital city of the Bahamas, lies on the island of New Providence; the other main inhabited islands are Grand Bahama, Eleuthera, Cat Island, Rum Cay, Long Island, San Salvador Island, Ragged Island, Acklins, Crooked Island, Exuma, Berry Islands, Mayaguana, the Bimini islands, Great Abaco and Great Inagua. The largest island is Andros.

All the islands are low and flat, with ridges that usually rise no more than 15 to 20 m (49 to 66 ft). The highest point in the country is Mount Alvernia (formerly Como Hill) on Cat Island at 64 m (210 ft).

The country contains three terrestrial ecoregions: Bahamian dry forests, Bahamian pine mosaic, and Bahamian mangroves. It had a 2019 Forest Landscape Integrity Index mean score of 7.35/10, ranking it 44th globally out of 172 countries. In the Bahamas forest cover is around 51 per cent of the total land area, equivalent to 509,860 hectares (ha) of forest in 2020, which was unchanged from 1990. In 2020, naturally regenerating forest covered 509,860 hectares (ha) and planted forest covered 0 hectares (ha). Of the naturally regenerating forest 0 per cent was reported to be primary forest (consisting of native tree species with no clearly visible indications of human activity) and around 0 per cent of the forest area was found within protected areas. For the year 2015, 80 percent of the forest area was reported to be under public ownership while 20 percent was under private ownership.

=== Climate ===
The Bahamas map of Köppen climate classification

According to the Köppen climate classification, the climate of the Bahamas is mostly tropical savannah climate or Aw, with a hot and wet season and a warm and dry season. The low latitude, warm tropical Gulf Stream, and low elevation give the Bahamas a warm and winterless climate.

The wet season of the archipelago runs from May to October. There is only a 7 °C (13 °F) difference between the warmest month and coolest month in most of the Bahama islands. Every few decades low temperatures can fall below 10 °C (50 °F) for a few hours when a severe cold outbreak comes down from the North American mainland, however there has never been a frost or freeze recorded in the Bahamian Islands. There is only one report in recorded history of snow being spotted anywhere in the Bahamas. This occurred in Freeport on 19 January 1977, when snow mixed with rain was visible in the air for a short time. The Bahamas are often sunny and dry for long periods, and average more than 3,000 hours or 340 days of sunlight annually. Much of the natural vegetation is tropical scrub and cactus and succulents are common in landscapes.

Tropical storms and hurricanes occasionally impact the Bahamas. In 1992, Hurricane Andrew passed over the northern portions of the islands, and Hurricane Floyd passed near the eastern portions of the islands in 1999. Hurricane Dorian of 2019 passed over the archipelago at destructive Category 5 strength with sustained winds of 298 km/h (185 mph) and wind gusts up to 350 km/h (220 mph), becoming the strongest tropical cyclone on record to impact the northwestern islands of Grand Bahama and Great Abaco.

Climate change is causing temperature increases in the Bahamas. The average temperature has increased by approximately 0.5 °C since 1960, and the rate of warming is more rapid in warmer seasons. Global temperature rise of 2 °C above preindustrial levels can increase the likelihood of extreme hurricane rainfall by four to five times in the Bahamas. The Bahamas is expected to be highly affected by sea level rise because at least 80 per cent of the total land is below 10 meters elevation. Climate change could also affect the seasonality of outbreaks and transmission of disease in the Bahamas.

Although the country's greenhouse gas emissions are comparatively small (2.94 million tonnes of green house gases emitted in 2023), The Bahamas is reliant on imported fossil fuels for energy generation. The government plans to increase solar energy capacity to 30 per cent of the country's total energy production by 2033. The Bahamas has pledged to reduce its emissions by 30 per cent by 2030, if international support is received.

=== Geology ===
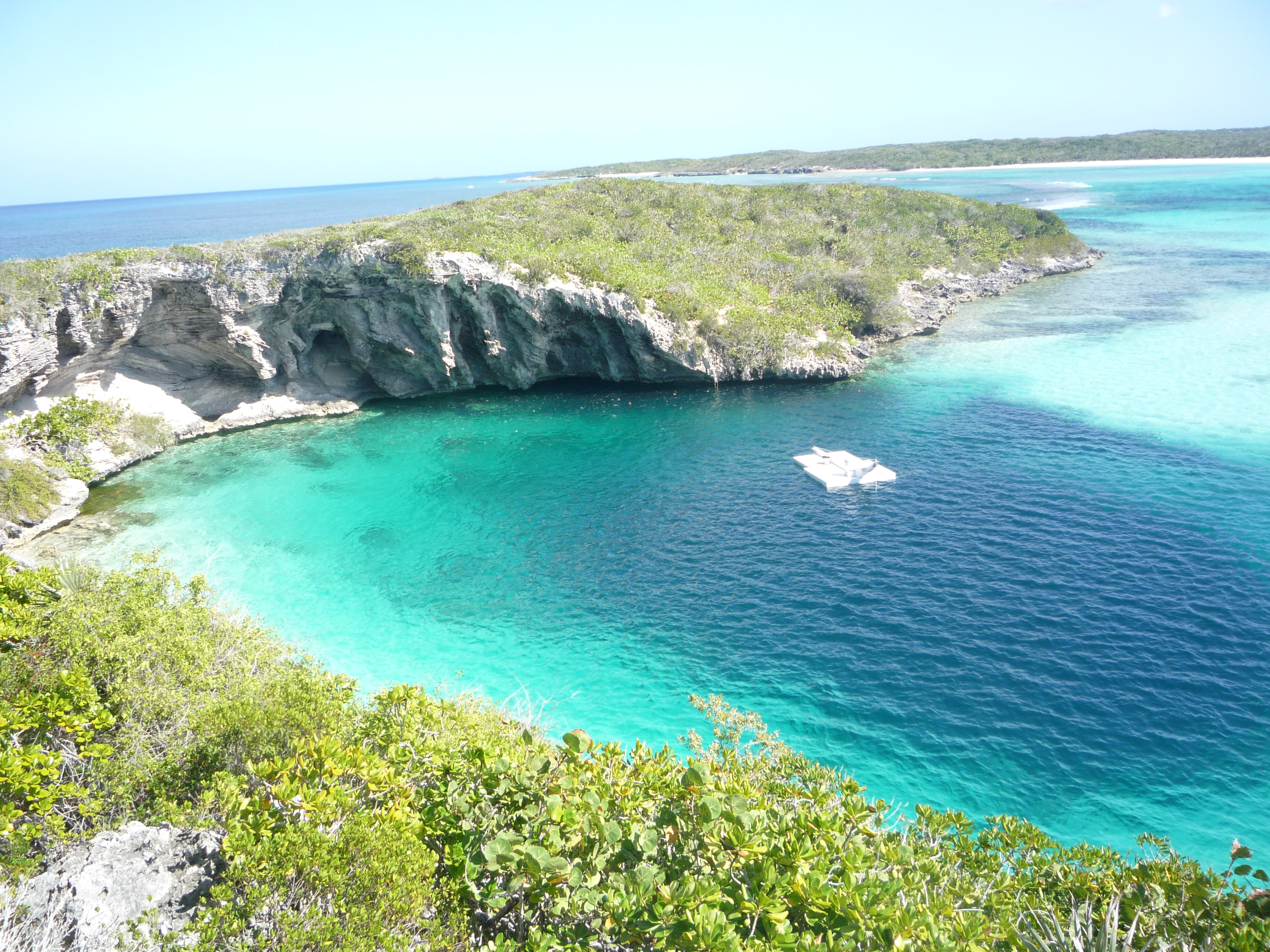
Dean's Blue Hole in Clarence Town on Long Island, Bahamas

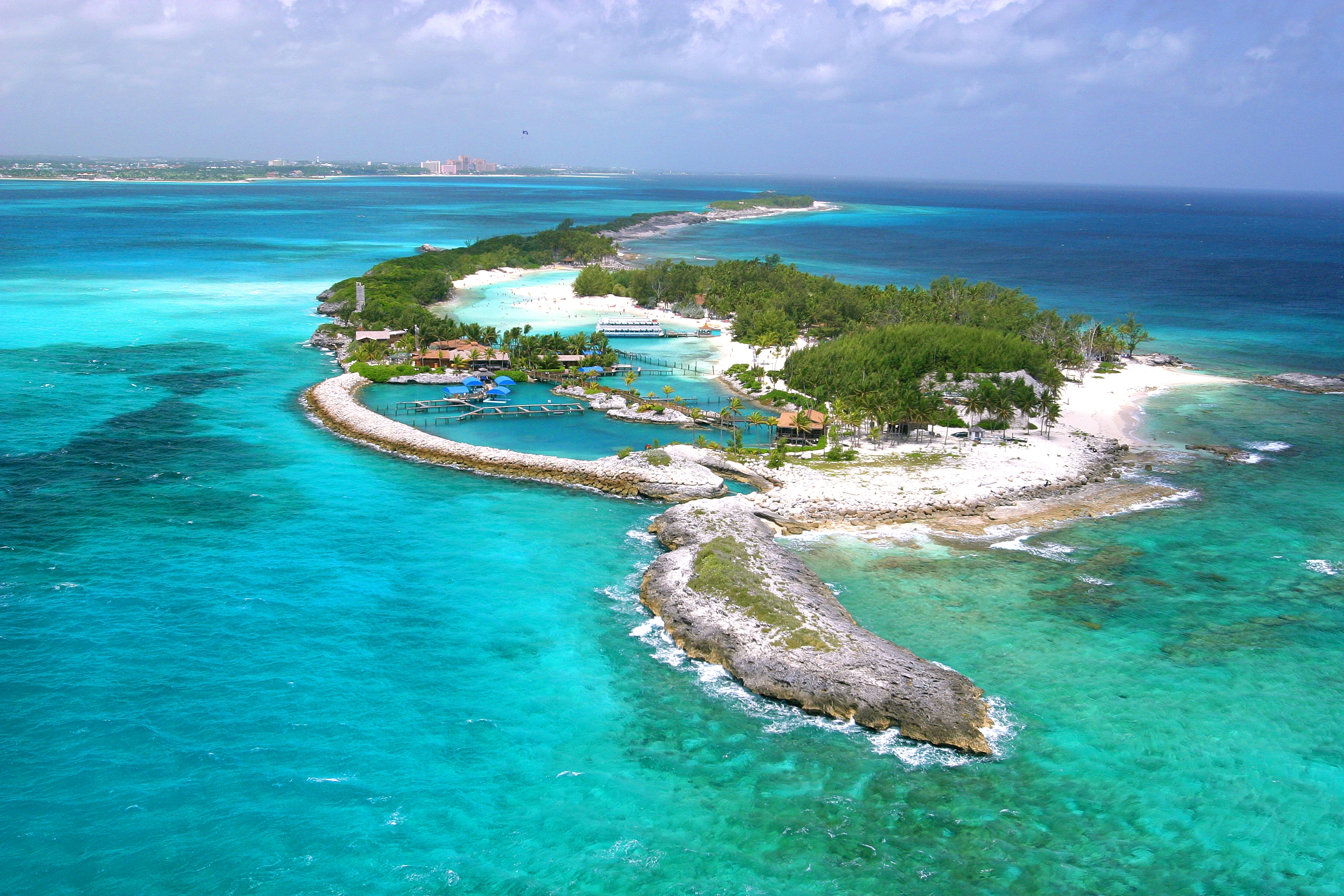
The Blue Lagoon Island, Bahamas

It is generally believed that the Bahamas were formed approximately 200 million years ago, when Pangaea started to break apart. In current times, it endures as an archipelago containing over 700 islands and cays, fringed around different coral reefs. The limestone that comprises the Banks has been accumulating since at least the Cretaceous period, and perhaps as early as the Jurassic; today the total thickness under the Great Bahama Bank is over 4.5 kilometres (2.8 miles). As the limestone was deposited in shallow water, the only way to explain this massive column is to estimate that the entire platform has subsided under its own weight at a rate of roughly 3.6 centimetres (2 inches) per 1,000 years.

The Bahamas is part of the Lucayan Archipelago, which continues into the Turks and Caicos Islands, the Mouchoir Bank, the Silver Bank, and the Navidad Bank. The Bahamas Platform, which includes the Bahamas, Southern Florida, Northern Cuba, the Turks and Caicos, and the Blake Plateau, formed about 150 Ma, not long after the formation of the North Atlantic. The 6.4 km (4.0 mi) thick limestones, which predominate in the Bahamas, date back to the Cretaceous. These limestones would have been deposited in shallow seas, assumed to be a stretched and thinned portion of the North American continental crust. Sediments were forming at about the same rate as the crust below was sinking due to the added weight. Thus, the entire area consisted of a large marine plain with some islands. Then, at about 80 Ma, the area became flooded by the Gulf Stream. This resulted in the drowning of the Blake Plateau, the separation of the Bahamas from Cuba and Florida, the separation of the southeastern Bahamas into separate banks, the creation of the Cay Sal Bank, plus the Little and Great Bahama Banks. Sedimentation from the "carbonate factory" of each bank, or atoll, continues today at the rate of about 20 mm (0.79 in) per kyr. Coral reefs form the "retaining walls" of these atolls, within which oolites and pellets form.

Coral growth was greater through the Tertiary, until the start of the ice ages, and hence those deposits are more abundant below a depth of 36 m (118 ft). In fact, an ancient extinct reef exists half a kilometre seaward of the present one, 30 m (98 ft) below sea level. Oolites form when oceanic water penetrates the shallow banks, increasing the temperature about 3 °C (5.4 °F) and the salinity by 0.5 per cent. Cemented ooids are referred to as grapestone. Additionally, giant stromatolites are found off the Exuma Cays.

Sea level changes resulted in a drop in sea level, causing wind blown oolite to form sand dunes with distinct cross-bedding. Overlapping dunes form oolitic ridges, which become rapidly lithified through the action of rainwater, called eolianite. Most islands have ridges ranging from 30 to 45 m (98 to 148 ft), though Cat Island has a ridge 60 m (200 ft) in height. The land between ridges is conducive to the formation of lakes and swamps.

Solution weathering of the limestone results in a "Bahamian Karst" topography. This includes potholes, blue holes such as Dean's Blue Hole, sinkholes, beachrock such as the Bimini Road ("pavements of Atlantis"), limestone crust, caves due to the lack of rivers, and sea caves. Several blue holes are aligned along the South Andros Fault line. Tidal flats and tidal creeks are common, but the more impressive drainage patterns are formed by troughs and canyons such as Great Bahama Canyon with the evidence of turbidity currents and turbidite deposition.

The stratigraphy of the islands consists of the Middle Pleistocene Owl's Hole Formation, overlain by the Late Pleistocene Grotto Beach Formation, and then the Holocene Rice Bay Formation. However, these units are not necessarily stacked on top of each other but can be located laterally. The oldest formation, Owl's Hole, is capped by a terra rosa paleosol, as is the Grotto Beach, unless eroded. The Grotto Beach Formation is the most widespread.

== Government and politics ==
Charles III
King

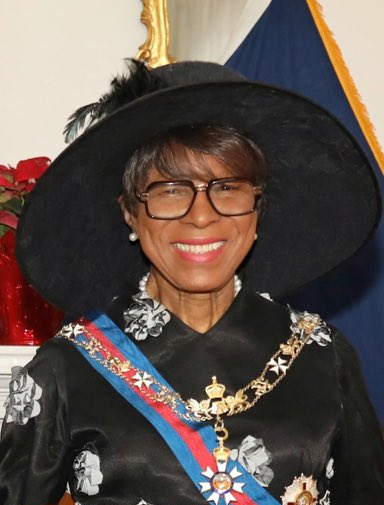
Cynthia A. Pratt
Governor-General

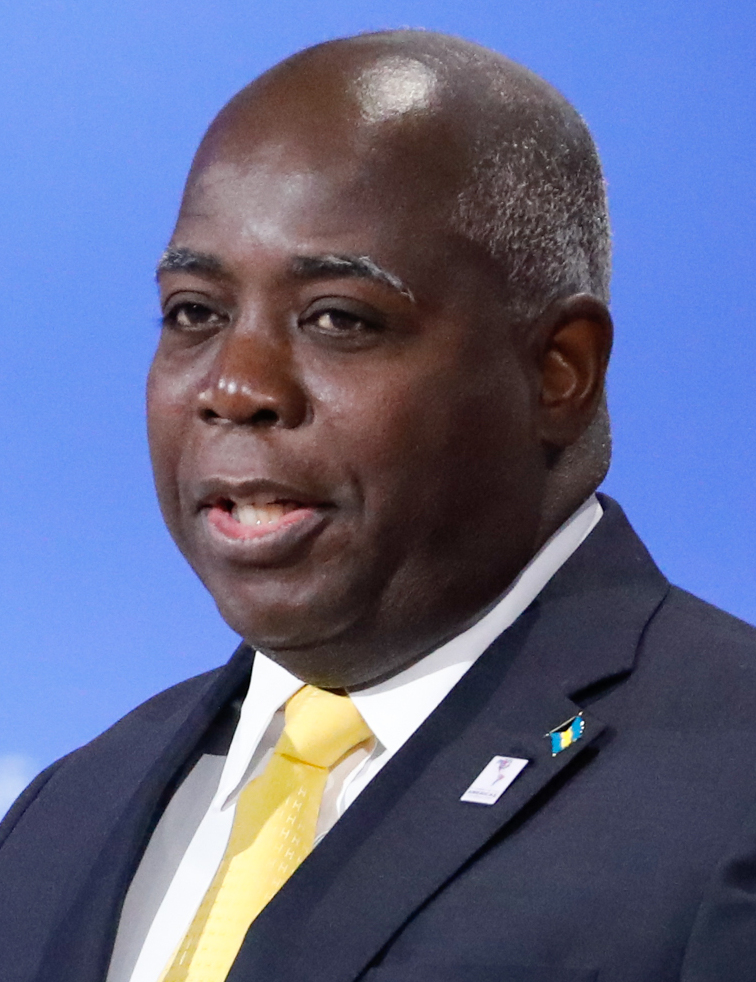
Philip Davis
Prime Minister

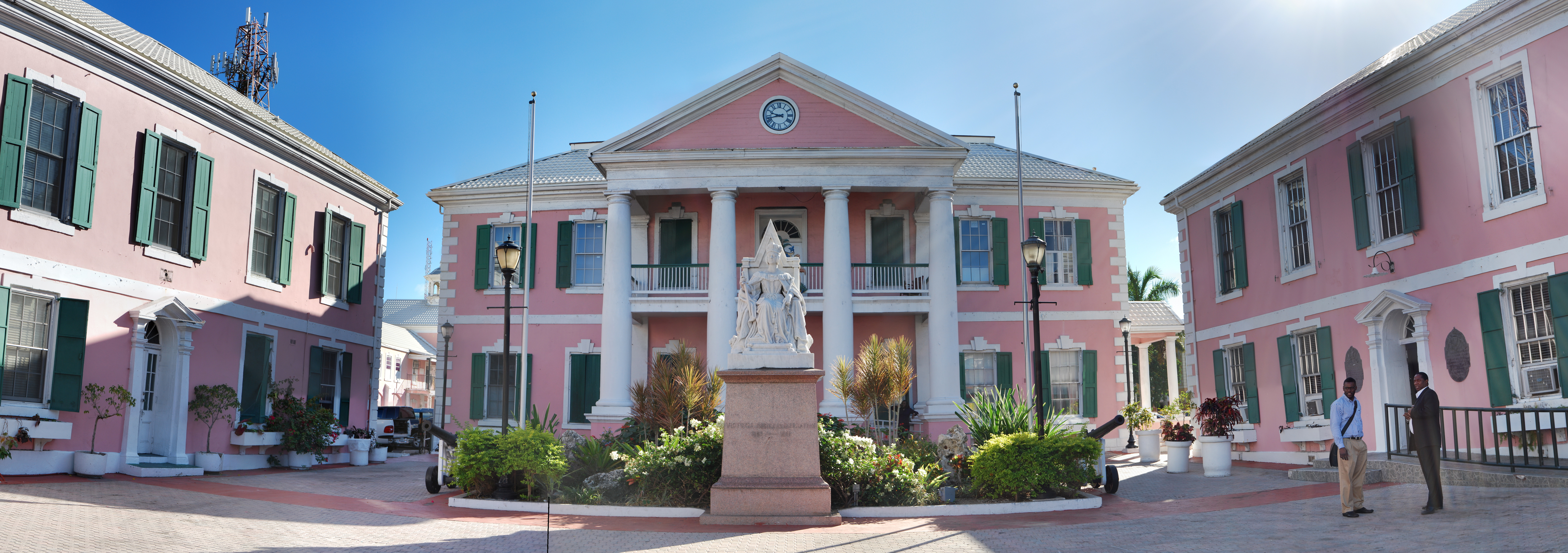
The Bahamian Parliament, located in Nassau

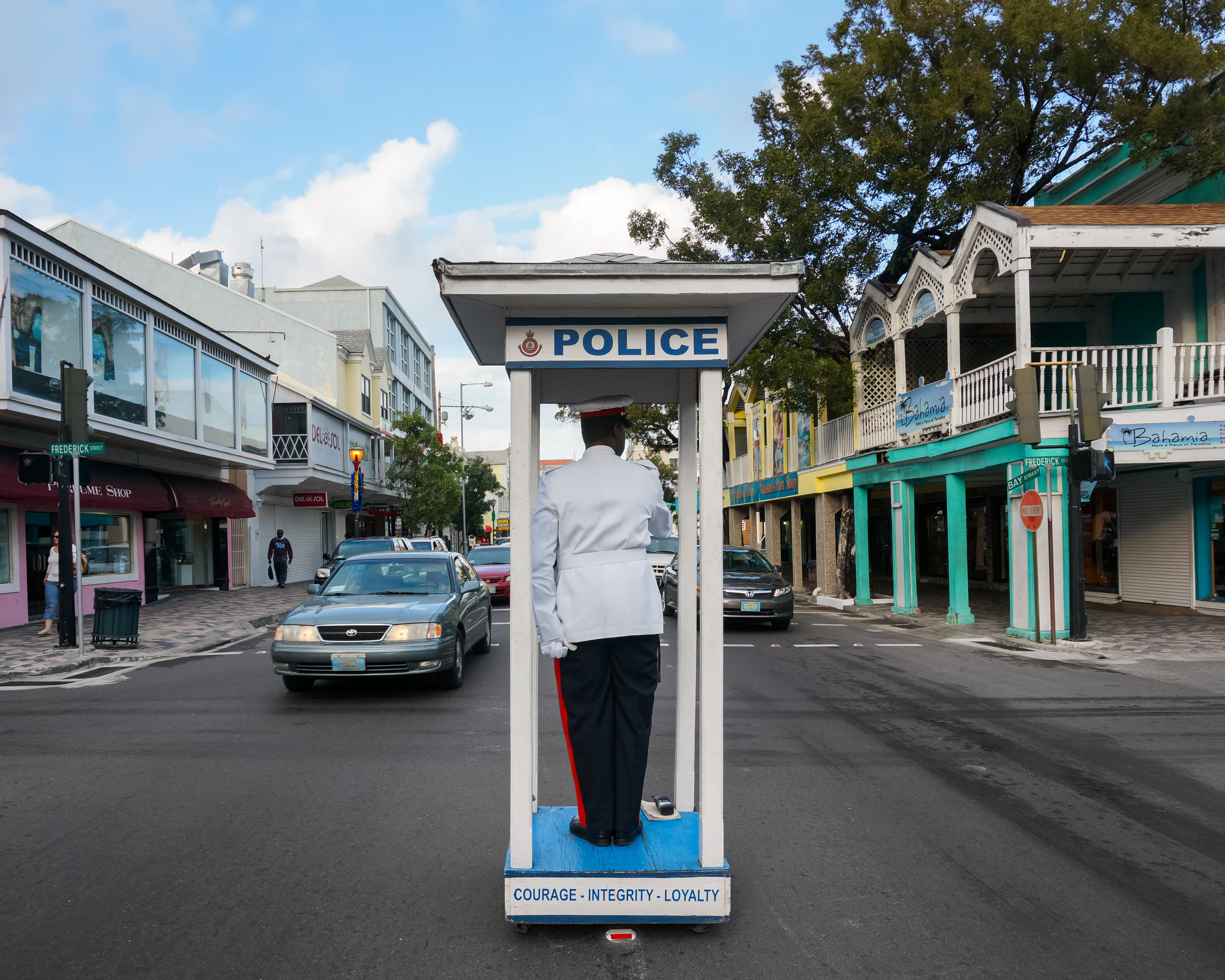
Traffic police in Nassau

The Bahamas is a parliamentary constitutional monarchy, with King Charles III, in his capacity as King of the Bahamas, as head of state represented locally by a governor-general. Political and legal traditions closely follow those of England and the Westminster system. Since gaining independence, the Bahamas has faced political challenges similar to those of other postcolonial island nations. Although the country has remained politically stable, it continues to address issues such as economic expansion, balancing party power, and improving government institutions. Researchers note that these trends are common across many small Caribbean island states. The Bahamas is a member of the Commonwealth of Nations and shares its head of state with the 14 other Commonwealth realms.

The prime minister is the head of government and is the leader of the party with the most seats in the House of Assembly. Executive power is exercised by the Cabinet, selected by the prime minister and drawn from his supporters in the House of Assembly. The current governor-general is Dame Cynthia A. Pratt, and the current prime minister is The Hon. Philip Davis, MP.

Legislative power is vested in a bicameral parliament, which consists of a 38-member House of Assembly (the lower house), with members elected from single-member districts, and a 16-member Senate, with members appointed by the governor-general, including nine on the advice of the prime minister, four on the advice of the leader of His Majesty's Loyal Opposition, and three on the advice of the prime minister after consultation with the Leader of the Opposition. As under the Westminster system, the prime minister may dissolve Parliament and call a general election at any time within a five-year term.

Constitutional safeguards include freedom of speech, press, worship, movement and association. The Judiciary of the Bahamas is independent of the executive and the legislature. Jurisprudence is based on English law.

=== Political culture ===
The Bahamas has a two-party system dominated by the centre-left Progressive Liberal Party and the centre-right Free National Movement. A handful of other political parties have been unable to win election to parliament; these have included the Bahamas Democratic Movement, the Coalition for Democratic Reform, Bahamian Nationalist Party and the Democratic National Alliance. There has been a growing republican movement in the Bahamas, particularly since the death of Elizabeth II, with a majority now supporting an elected head of state according to an opinion poll.

=== Administrative divisions ===
The districts of the Bahamas provide a system of local government everywhere except New Providence (which holds 70 per cent of the national population), whose affairs are handled directly by the central government. In 1996, the Bahamian Parliament passed the "Local Government Act" to facilitate the establishment of family island administrators, local government districts, local district councillors and local town committees for the various island communities. The overall goal of this act is to allow the various elected leaders to govern and oversee the affairs of their respective districts without the interference of the central government. In total, there are 32 districts, with elections being held every five years. There are 110 councillors and 281 town committee members elected to represent the various districts.

Each councillor or town committee member is responsible for the proper use of public funds for the maintenance and development of their constituency.

The districts other than New Providence are:

1. Acklins
2. Berry Islands
3. Bimini
4. Black Point, Exuma
5. Cat Island
6. Central Abaco
7. Central Andros
8. Central Eleuthera
9. City of Freeport, Grand Bahama
10. Crooked Island
11. East Grand Bahama
12. Exuma
13. Grand Cay, Abaco
14. Harbour Island, Eleuthera
15. Hope Town, Abaco
16. Inagua
17. Long Island
18. Mangrove Cay, Andros
19. Mayaguana
20. Moore's Island, Abaco
21. North Abaco
22. North Andros
23. North Eleuthera
24. Ragged Island
25. Rum Cay
26. San Salvador
27. South Abaco
28. South Andros
29. South Eleuthera
30. Spanish Wells, Eleuthera
31. West Grand Bahama

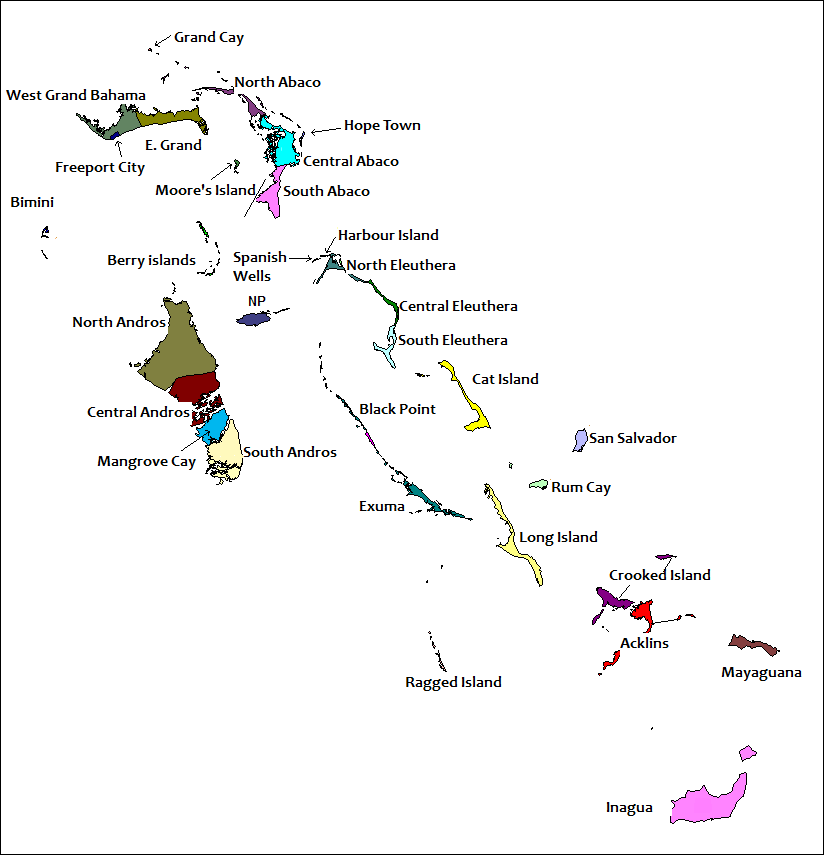
Districts of the Bahamas

=== Foreign relations ===
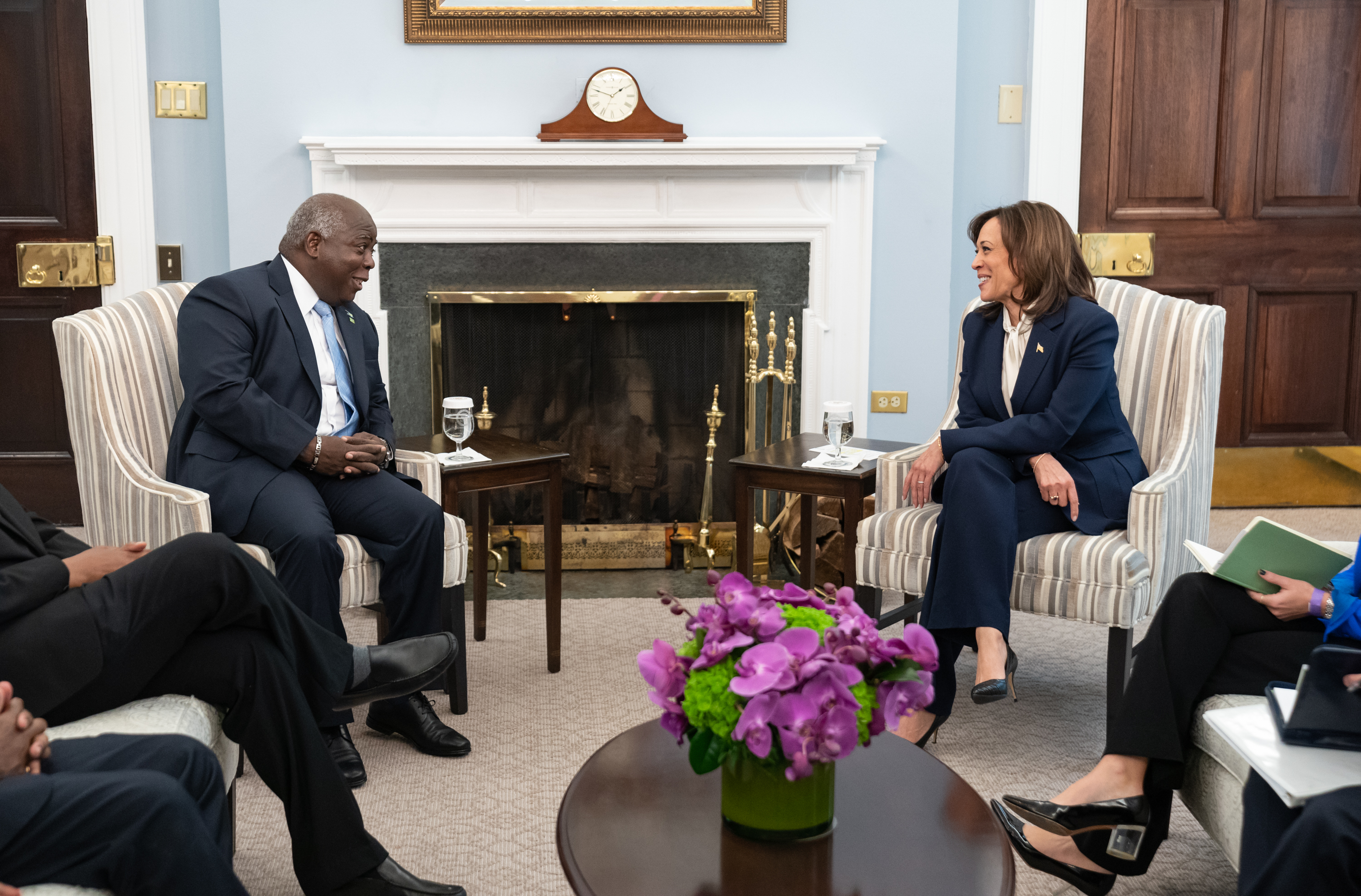
U.S. Vice President Kamala Harris with Prime Minister Philip Davis of the Bahamas at the Office of the Vice President in 2023

The Bahamas has strong bilateral relationships with the United States and the United Kingdom, represented by an ambassador in Washington and High Commissioner in London. The Bahamas also associates closely with other nations of the Caribbean Community (CARICOM).

The embassy of the United States in Nassau donated $3.6 million to the minister for disaster preparedness, management, and reconstruction for modular shelters, medical evacuation boats, and construction materials. The donation was made two weeks after the one-year anniversary of Hurricane Dorian.

=== Military ===
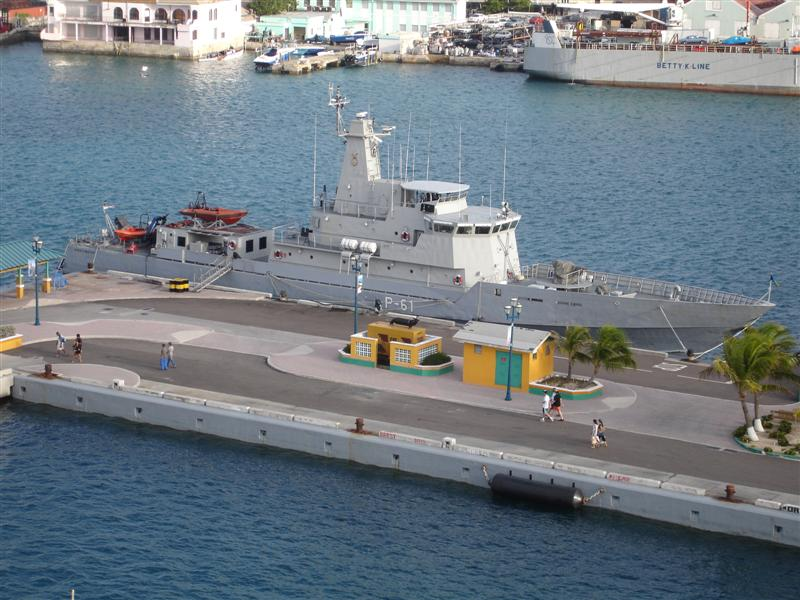
HMBS Nassau (P-61)

The Bahamian military is the Royal Bahamas Defence Force (RBDF), the navy of the Bahamas which includes a land unit called Commando Squadron (Regiment) and an Air Wing (Air Force). Under the Defence Act, the RBDF has been mandated, in the name of the king, to defend the Bahamas, protect its territorial integrity, patrol its waters, provide assistance and relief in times of disaster, maintain order in conjunction with the law enforcement agencies of the Bahamas, and carry out any such duties as determined by the National Security Council. The Defence Force is also a member of the Caribbean Community (CARICOM)'s Regional Security Task Force.

The RBDF came into existence on 31 March 1980. Its duties include defending the Bahamas, stopping drug smuggling, illegal immigration and poaching, and providing assistance to mariners. The Defence Force has a fleet of 26 coastal and inshore patrol craft along with 2 aircraft and over 1,100 personnel including 65 officers and 74 women.

== Economy ==
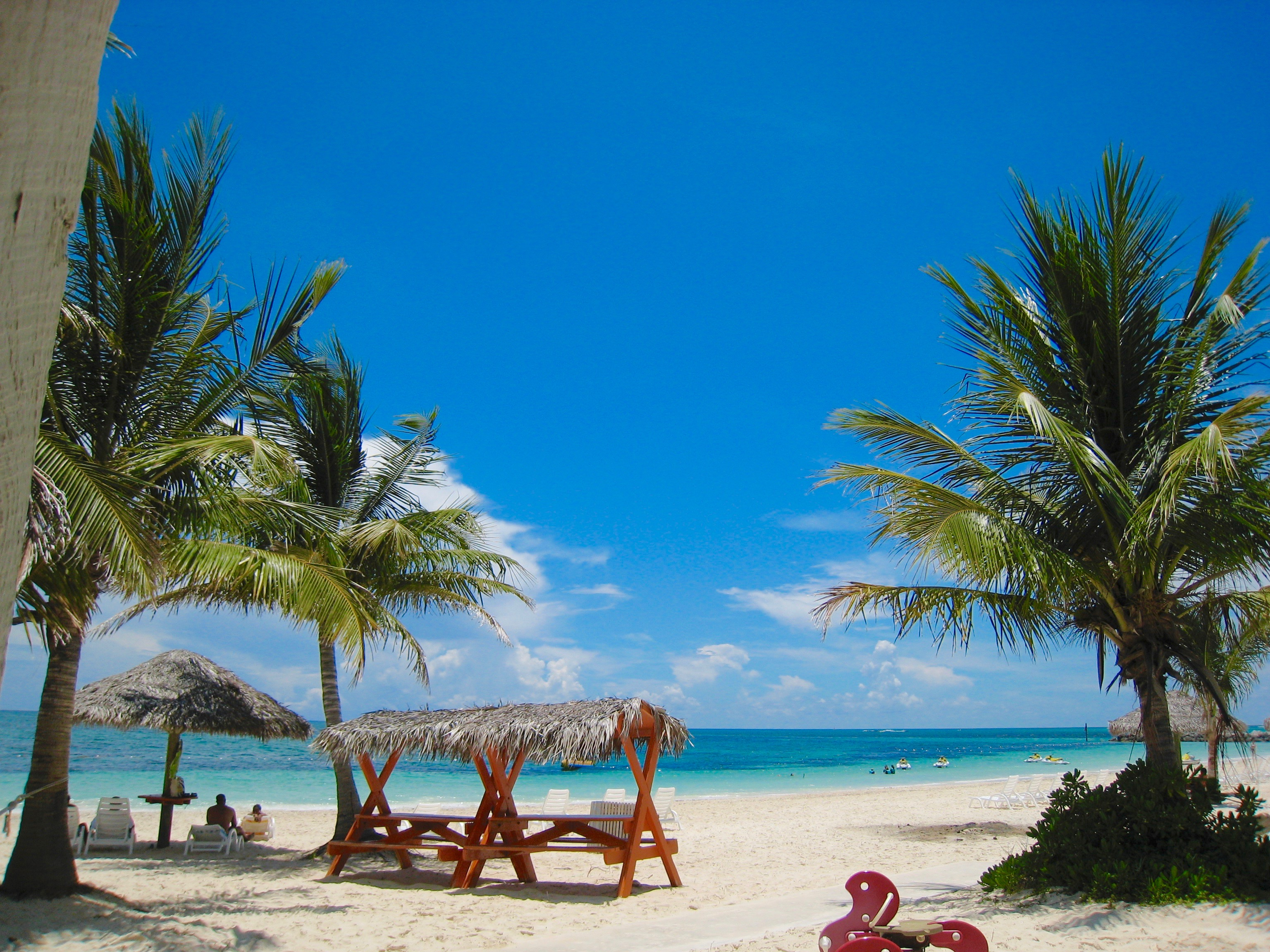
Taino Beach, Grand Bahama Island

In terms of GDP per capita, the Bahamas is one of the wealthiest countries in the Americas. Its currency (the Bahamian dollar) is kept at a 1-to-1 peg with the US dollar. The International Monetary Fund's 2023 report states that the Bahamas has improved its financial stability since the pandemic. The country has increased its revenue and begun lowering its fiscal deficit, helped by the return of tourism and financial reforms. However, the report also warns that the Bahamas continues to face risks from global economic shifts, climate threats, and its dependence on imported goods.

The Bahamas relies heavily on tourism to generate most of its economic activity. Tourism as an industry accounts for about 70 per cent of the Bahamian GDP and provides jobs for about half of the country's workforce. Tourism makes up a large part of the Bahamas' economy, and the COVID-19 pandemic showed the risks of relying so heavily on it. A 2023 study found that the Bahamas experienced one of the biggest drops in tourism in the region, which pushed leaders to explore ways to build a stronger and more diverse economy. The study notes that although tourism is recovering, progress has been uneven, and the country has focused heavily on rebuilding visitor confidence and promoting sustainable tourism. The Bahamas attracted 5.8 million visitors in 2012, more than 70 per cent of whom were cruise visitors. In 2024, the Bahamas recorded a new tourism high of about 11.22 million visitors (air and sea combined), up ≈16% from 2023. Agriculture and manufacturing form the third largest sector of the Bahamian economy, representing 5–7% of total GDP. An estimated 80 per cent of the Bahamian food supply is imported. Major crops include onions, okra, tomatoes, oranges, grapefruit, cucumbers, sugar cane, lemons, limes and sweet potatoes.

Access to biocapacity in the Bahamas is much higher than the world average. In 2016 the Bahamas had 9.2 global hectares of biocapacity per person within its territory, much more than the world average of 1.6 global hectares per person. In 2016 the Bahamas used 3.7 global hectares of biocapacity per person – their ecological footprint of consumption. This means they use less biocapacity than the Bahamas contains. As a result, the Bahamas is running a biocapacity reserve.

=== Bahamas as a tax haven ===
After tourism, the next most important economic sector is banking and offshore international financial services, accounting for some 15 per cent of GDP. It was revealed in the Panama Papers that the Bahamas is the jurisdiction with the most offshore entities or companies in the world.

The Bahamas is considered a major international financial centre. According to some estimates, it is the fourth-largest tax haven globally based on assets under management. It is believed to hold approximately US$13.7 trillion in private household wealth and an additional US$12 trillion in corporate wealth sheltered within offshore shell companies. This combined figure represents roughly a quarter of the world's annual wealth creation. As recently as 2019 the offshore financial services sector contributed an estimated 20 per cent to the Bahamian economy.

The economy has a very competitive tax regime (classified by some as a tax haven). The government derives its revenue from import tariffs, VAT, licence fees, property and stamp taxes, but there is no income tax, corporate tax, capital gains tax, or wealth tax. Payroll taxes fund social insurance benefits and amount to 3.9 per cent paid by the employee and 5.9 per cent paid by the employer. In 2010 overall tax revenue as a percentage of GDP was 17.2 per cent.

=== Transport ===
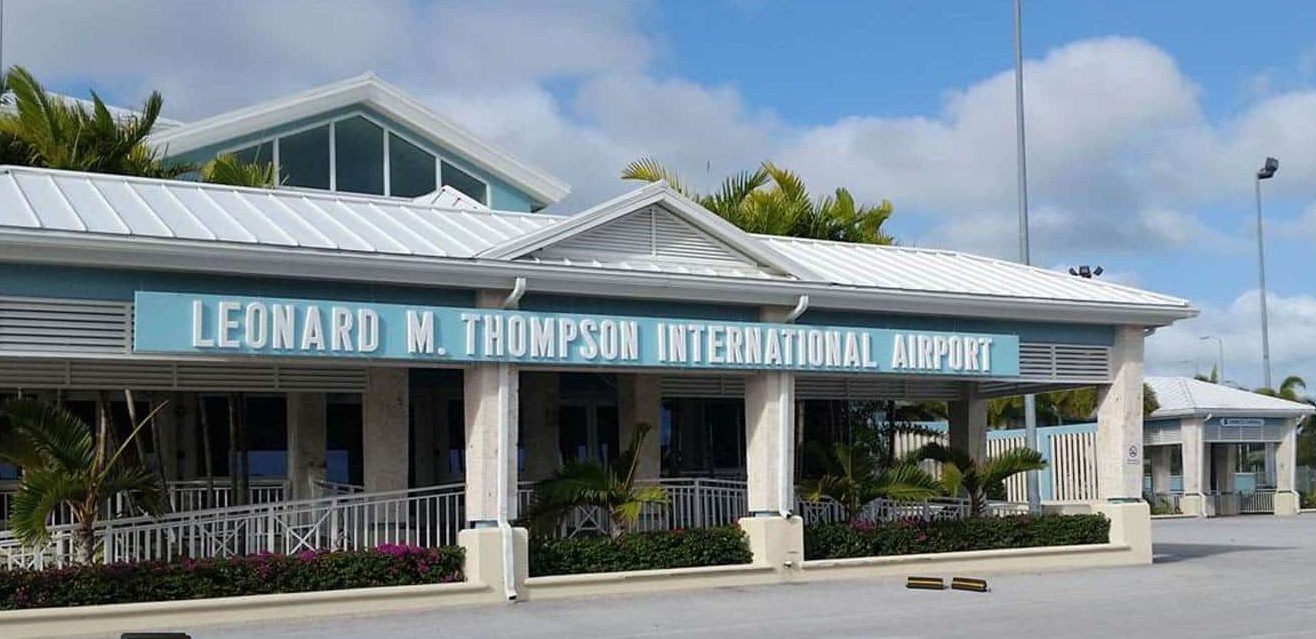
Leonard M. Thompson International Airport

The Bahamas contains about 1,620 km (1,010 mi) of paved roads. Inter-island transport is conducted primarily via ship and air. The country has 61 airports, the chief of which are Lynden Pindling International Airport on New Providence, Grand Bahama International Airport on Grand Bahama Island, and Leonard M. Thompson International Airport (formerly Marsh Harbour Airport) on Abaco Island.

== Demographics ==
Demographics of Bahamas, data of FAO; number of inhabitants in thousands

The Bahamas had a population of 407,906 at the 2018 Census, of which 25.9 per cent were 14 or under, 67.2 per cent 15 to 64 and 6.9 per cent over 65. It has a population growth rate of 0.925 per cent (2010), with a birth rate of 17.81/1,000 population, death rate of 9.35/1,000, and net migration rate of −2.13 migrant(s)/1,000 population. The infant mortality rate is 23.21 deaths/1,000 live births. Residents have a life expectancy at birth of 69.87 years: 73.49 years for females, 66.32 years for males. The total fertility rate is 2.0 children born/woman (2010). The latest official estimate (as at 2022) is 400,516. The Bahamas is one of the highest-ranked Caribbean countries on the UN Human Development Index, showing strong results in income, education, and life expectancy. However, the United Nations Development Programme notes that the country still faces challenges such as economic inequality, climate risks, and limited land space. The World Bank also states that investing in climate protection and building a more diverse economy are key to supporting long-term growth.

The most populous islands are New Providence, where Nassau, the capital and largest city, is located; and Grand Bahama, home to the second-largest city of Freeport.

=== Racial and ethnic groups ===
According to the 99 percent response rate obtained from the race question on the 2010 Census questionnaire, 90.6 per cent of the population identified themselves as being Black, 4.7 per cent White and 2.1 per cent of a Mixed (African and European). Three centuries prior, in 1722 when the first official census of the Bahamas was taken, 74 per cent of the population was native European and 26 per cent native African.

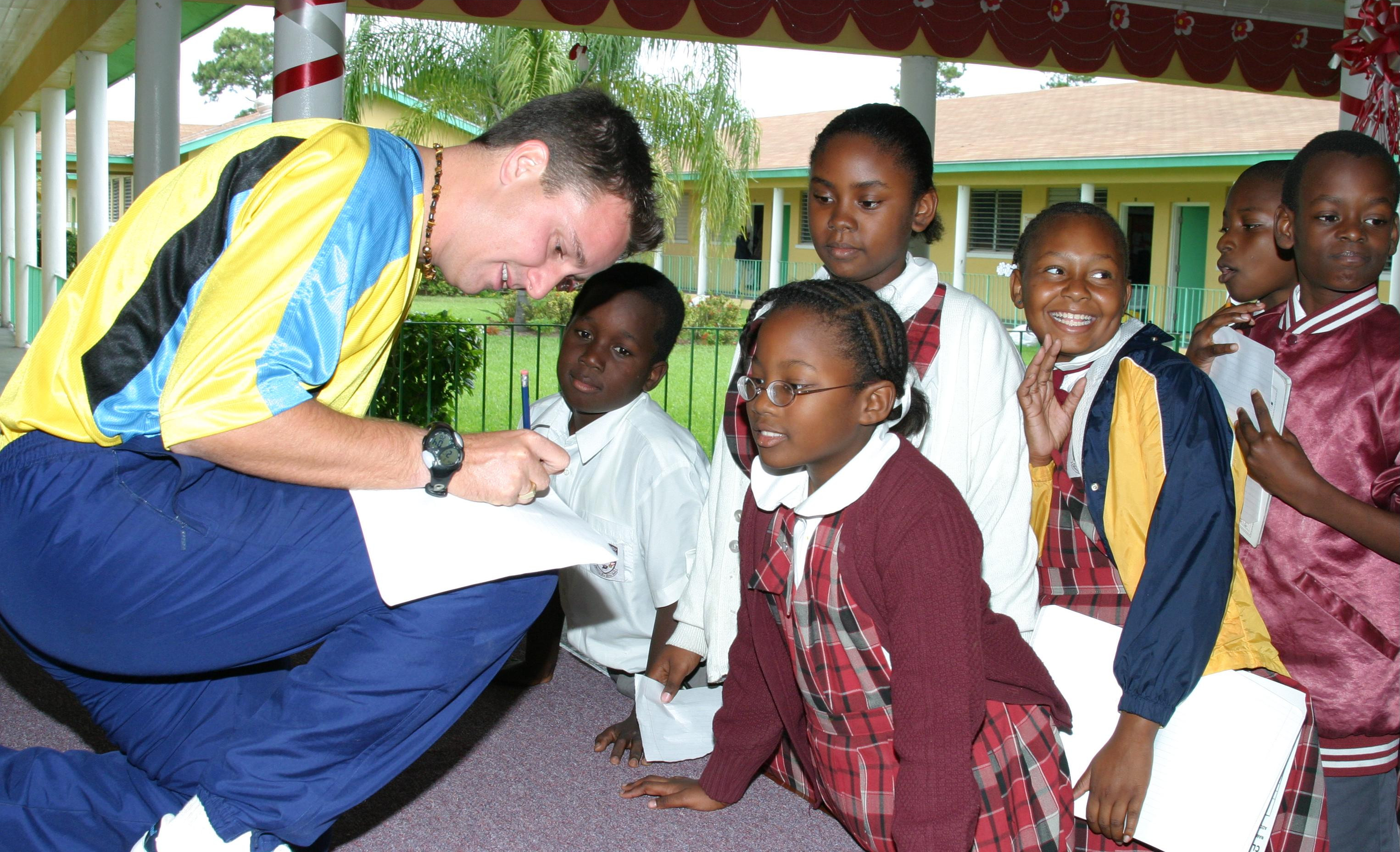
Afro-Bahamian children at a local school

Since the colonial era of plantations, Africans or Afro-Bahamians have been the largest ethnic group in the Bahamas, whose primary ancestry was based in West Africa. The first Africans to arrive in the Bahamas were freed slaves from Bermuda; they arrived with the Eleutheran Adventurers looking for new lives.

The Haitian community in the Bahamas is also largely of African descent and numbers about 80,000. Due to an extremely high immigration of Haitians to the Bahamas, the Bahamian government started deporting illegal Haitian immigrants to their homeland in late 2014.

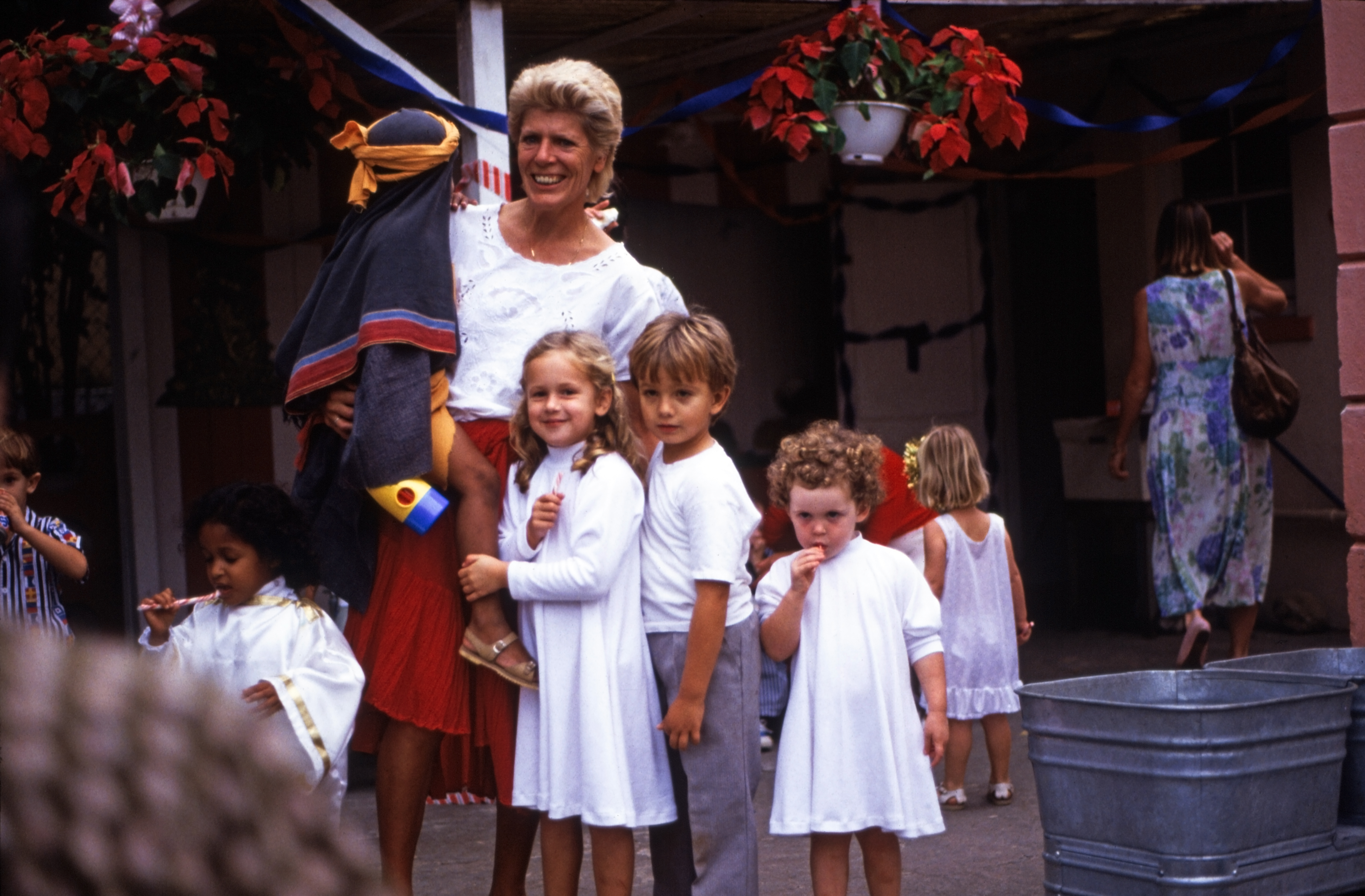
White Bahamians on the island of New Providence

The white Bahamian population are mainly the descendants of the English Puritans and American Loyalists escaping the American Revolution who arrived in 1649 and 1783, respectively. Many Southern Loyalists went to the Abaco Islands, half of whose population was of European descent as of 1985. The term white is usually used to identify Bahamians with Anglo ancestry, as well as some light-skinned Afro-Bahamians. Sometimes Bahamians use the term Conchy Joe to describe people of Anglo descent. Generally, however, Bahamians self-identify as white or black along the lines similar to the distinction made in the US.

A small portion of the Euro-Bahamian population are Greek Bahamians, descended from Greek labourers who came to help develop the sponging industry in the 1900s. They make up less than 2 per cent of the nation's population, but have still preserved their distinct Greek Bahamian culture.

Other ethnic groups in the Bahamas include Asians and people of Spanish and Portuguese origin.

=== Languages ===
The official language of the Bahamas is English. Many people speak an English-based creole language called Bahamian dialect (known simply as "dialect") or "Bahamianese". Laurente Gibbs, a Bahamian writer and actor, was the first to coin the latter name in a poem and has since promoted its usage. Both are used as autoglossonyms. Haitian Creole, a French-based creole language, is spoken by Haitians and their descendants, who make up of about 25% of the total population. It is known simply as Creole to differentiate it from Bahamian English.

=== Religion ===
Religion in the Bahamas (2010)
1. Protestantism (80.0%)
2. Catholicism (14.5%)
3. Other Christian (1.30%)
4. Unaffiliated (3.10%)
5. Other religion (1.10%)

The islands' population is predominantly Christian. Protestant denominations collectively account for more than 70 per cent of the population, with Baptists representing 35 per cent of the population, Anglicans 15 per cent, Pentecostals 8 per cent, Church of God 5 per cent, Seventh-day Adventists 5 per cent and Methodists 4 per cent. There is also a significant Roman Catholic community, which accounts for about 14 per cent.

Jews in the Bahamas have a history dating back to the Columbus expeditions, where Luis de Torres, an interpreter and member of Columbus' party, is believed to have been secretly Jewish. Today, there is a small community with about 200 members, according to census data, although higher estimates place this figure at 300.

Muslims also have a minority presence. While some slaves and free Africans in the colonial era were Muslim, the religion was absent until around the 1970s, when it experienced a revival. Today, there are about 300 Muslims.

There are also smaller communities of Baháʼís, Hindus, Rastafari and practitioners of traditional African religions, such as Obeah.

=== Education ===
According to 2011 estimates, 95 per cent of the Bahamian adult population are literate.

The University of The Bahamas (UB) is the national higher education/tertiary system. Offering baccalaureate, masters and associate degrees, UB has three campuses, and teaching and research centres throughout the Bahamas. The University of The Bahamas was chartered on 10 November 2016.

== Culture ==
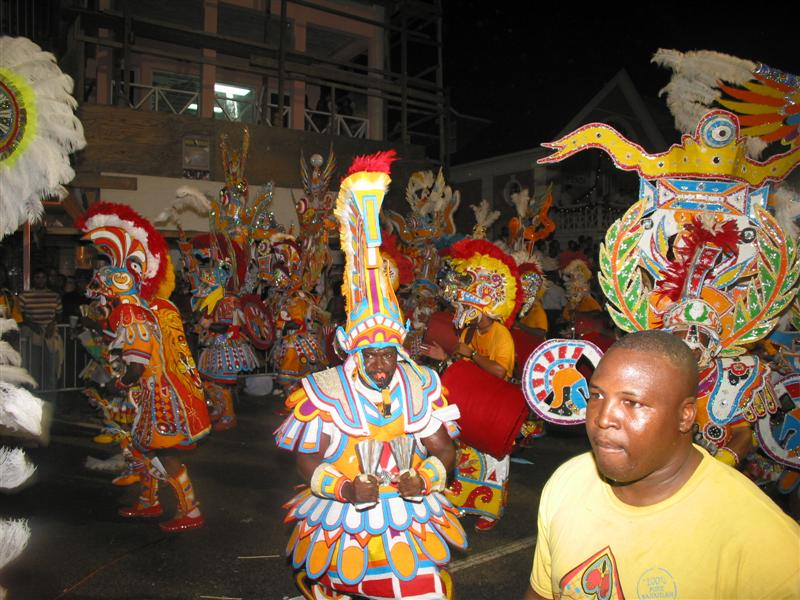
Junkanoo celebration in Nassau

The culture of the islands is a mixture of African (Afro-Bahamians being the largest ethnicity), British and American due to historical family ties, migration to the Bahamas of people freed from enslavement in the United States, and as the dominant country in the region and source of most tourists. The Bahamian national identity is influenced by African heritage, its colonial past, and modern cultural traditions. Research shows that storytelling, festivals, and shared memories bring people together across the islands. These traditions continue to shape how Bahamians view their nation and their communities today.

A form of African-based folk magic is practised by some Bahamians, mainly in the Family Islands (out-islands) of the Bahamas. The practice of obeah is illegal in the Bahamas and punishable in law.

In the outer islands also called Family Islands, handicrafts include basketry made from palm fronds. This material, commonly called "straw", is plaited into hats and bags that are popular tourist items.

Junkanoo is a traditional Afro-Bahamian street parade of 'rushing', music, dance and art held in Nassau (and a few other settlements) every Boxing Day, New Year's Day and Independence Day. Junkanoo is also used to celebrate other holidays and events such as Emancipation Day.

Regattas are important social events in many family island settlements. They usually feature one or more days of sailing by old-fashioned work boats, as well as an onshore festival.

Many dishes are associated with Bahamian cuisine, which reflects Caribbean, African and European influences. Some settlements have festivals associated with the traditional crop or food of that area, such as the "Pineapple Fest" in Gregory Town, Eleuthera or the "Crab Fest" on Andros. Other significant traditions include story telling.

Bahamians have created a rich literature of poetry, short stories, plays and short fictional works. Common themes in these works are (1) an awareness of change, (2) a striving for sophistication, (3) a search for identity, (4) nostalgia for the old ways and (5) an appreciation of beauty. Some major writers are Susan Wallace, Marion Bethel, Percival Miller, Robert Johnson, Raymond Brown, O.M. Smith, William Johnson, Eddie Minnis and Winston Saunders.

The best-known folklore and legends in the Bahamas include the lusca and chickcharney creatures of Andros, Pretty Molly on Exuma Bahamas and the Lost City of Atlantis on Bimini Bahamas.

=== Symbols ===
The Bahamian flag was adopted in 1973. Its colours symbolise the strength of the Bahamian people; its design reflects aspects of the natural environment (sun and sea) and economic and social development. The flag is a black equilateral triangle against the mast, superimposed on a horizontal background made up of three equal stripes of aquamarine, gold and aquamarine.

The coat of arms of the Bahamas contains a shield with the national symbols as its focal point. The shield is supported by a marlin and a flamingo, which are the national animals of the Bahamas. The flamingo is located on the land, and the marlin on the sea, indicating the geography of the islands.

On top of the shield is a conch shell, which represents the marine life of the island chain. The conch shell rests on a helmet. Below this is the actual shield, the main symbol of which is a ship representing the Santa María of Christopher Columbus, shown sailing beneath the sun. Along the bottom, below the shield appears a banner upon which is the national motto:

Forward, Upward, Onward Together.

The national flower of the Bahamas is the yellow elder, as it is endemic to the Bahama islands and it blooms throughout the year.

Selection of the yellow elder over many other flowers was made through the combined popular vote of members of all four of New Providence's garden clubs of the 1970s—the Nassau Garden Club, the Carver Garden Club, the International Garden Club and the YWCA Garden Club. They reasoned that other flowers grown there—such as the bougainvillea, hibiscus and poinciana—had already been chosen as the national flowers of other countries. The yellow elder, on the other hand, was unclaimed by other countries (although it is now also the national flower of the United States Virgin Islands) and also the yellow elder is native to the family islands.

=== Sport ===
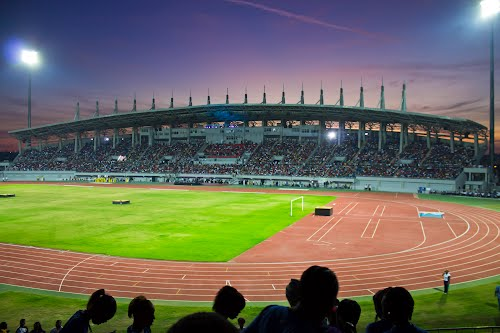
Thomas Robinson Stadium in Nassau

Sport is a significant part of Bahamian culture. Sailing is the national sport and has been a part of the national culture for many years from its history of privateers and pirates to modern day yachting. Annually, there are about 35 annual sailing events in the Bahamas, divided into 18 senior regattas and 17 junior sailing competitions.

Cricket has been played in the Bahamas from 1846 and is the oldest sport played in the country today. The Bahamas Cricket Association was formed in 1936, and from the 1940s to the 1970s, cricket was played amongst many Bahamians. Bahamas is not a part of the West Indies Cricket Board, so players are not eligible to play for the West Indies cricket team. The late 1970s saw the game begin to decline in the country as teachers, who had previously come from the United Kingdom with a passion for cricket, were replaced by teachers who had been trained in the United States. The Bahamian physical education teachers had no knowledge of the game and instead taught track and field, basketball, baseball, softball, volleyball and association football where primary and high schools compete against each other. Today cricket is still enjoyed by a few locals and immigrants in the country, usually from Jamaica, Guyana, Trinidad and Barbados. Cricket is played on Saturdays and Sundays at Windsor Park and Haynes Oval in Nassau. Whiles the main and only cricket grounds on Grand Bahama is the Lucaya Cricket Oval.

The only other sporting event that began before cricket was horse racing, which started in 1796. The most popular spectator sports are those imported from the United States, such as basketball, American football, and baseball, rather than from the British Isles, due to the country's close proximity to the United States, unlike their other Caribbean counterparts, where cricket, soccer, and netball have proven to be more popular.

Over the years, American football has become much more popular than soccer. Leagues for teens and adults have been developed by the Bahamas American Football Federation. However, soccer, as it is commonly known in the country, is still a very popular sport amongst high school pupils. Leagues are governed by the Bahamas Football Association. In 2013, the Bahamian government has been working closely with Tottenham Hotspur of London to promote the sport in the country as well as promoting the Bahamas in the European market. In 2013, 'Spurs' became the first Premier League club to play an exhibition match in the Bahamas, facing the Jamaica men's national team. Joe Lewis, the owner of the club, is based in the Bahamas.

Other popular sports are swimming, tennis and boxing, where Bahamians have enjoyed some degree of success at the international level. Other sports such as golf, rugby league, rugby union, beach soccer, and netball are considered growing sports. Athletics, commonly known as 'track and field' in the country, is the most successful sport by far amongst Bahamians. Bahamians have a strong tradition in the sprints and jumps. Track and field is probably the most popular spectator sport in the country next to basketball due to their success over the years. Triathlons are gaining popularity in Nassau and the Family Islands.

The Bahamas first participated at the Olympic Games in 1952, and has sent athletes to compete in every Summer Olympic Games since then, except when they participated in the American-led boycott of the 1980 Summer Olympics. The nation has never participated in any Winter Olympic Games. Bahamian athletes have won a total of sixteen medals, all in athletics and sailing. The Bahamas has won more Olympic medals than any other country with a population under one million.

The Bahamas were hosts of the first men's senior FIFA tournament to be staged in the Caribbean, the 2017 FIFA Beach Soccer World Cup. The Bahamas also hosted the first three editions of the IAAF World Relays. The nation also hosted the 2017 Commonwealth Youth Games, along with annual events Bahamas Bowl and Battle 4 Atlantis.

== See also ==
- Outline of the Bahamas
- Index of Bahamas-related articles
