= E. Clement Bethel =

Bahamian composer, pianist and choral director (1938–1987)

- Born: Edward Clement Bethel; 11 February 1938; Nassau, Bahamas
- Died: 24 September 1987 (aged 49)
- Occupations: Composer, pianist and choral director
- Children: Nicolette Bethel

Edward Clement Bethel (11 February 1938 – 24 August 1987) was a Bahamian composer, pianist and choral director who became the first Director of Culture in the Bahamas.

== Biography ==
Clement Bethel was born in Nassau, Bahamas, to Edward Irvin Bethel and Lilias Ethel Bethel. He was trained as a classical pianist in London, but chose to dedicate his life to the development of culture in the Bahamas. Under his direction, the new nation of the Bahamas learned an appreciation of its indigenous music.

He co-wrote and directed the Independence Pageant, a survey of Bahamian history from pre-Columbian days to Bahamian Independence from Britain, which was performed on the evening leading up to the morning of July 10, 1973. He composed the folk opera Sammie Swain, which he adapted from a Bahamian folktale and he wrote and arranged many Bahamian songs.

Bethel's MA thesis in ethnomusicology, Music in The Bahamas: its Roots, Rhyme and Personality, covered the development of Bahamian music from the slave era to the 20th century, and one chapter of that thesis was expanded into the book Junkanoo: Festival of The Bahamas (Macmillan Caribbean 1992, ISBN 0-333-55469-8). Bethel's children were named Nicolette Bethel and Edward Clement Bethel Junior.

Bethel died at the age of 49 from a hereditary kidney illness. His daughter, Nicolette Bethel, has continued his work and expanded Junkanoo: Festival of The Bahamas.
