= Lucayan Archipelago =

Archipelago in the Northwestern West Indies

- Archipelago
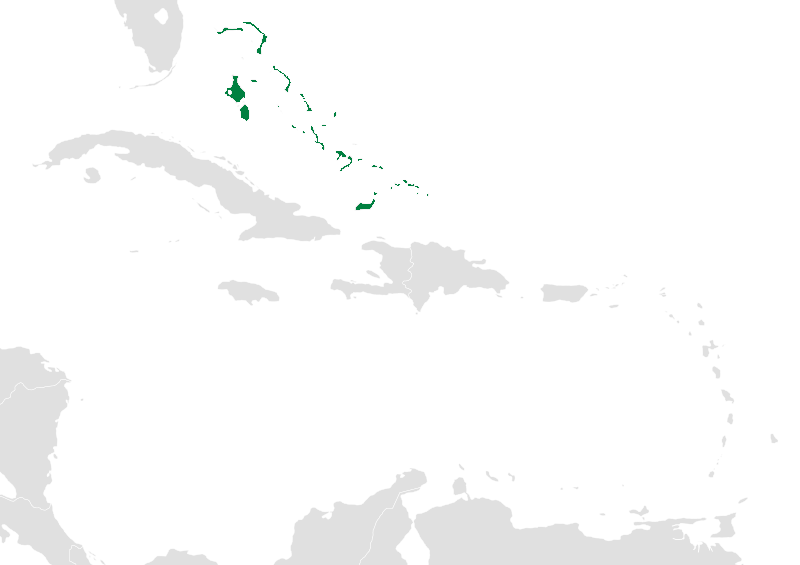
- Location within the Caribbean
- Coordinates: 23.74°N 75.37°W
- Continent: North America
- Subregion: Caribbean
- Countries and territories: 2: Bahamas; Turks and Caicos Islands (United Kingdom)

Area
  - Total: 14,308 km^{2} (5,524 sq mi)

Population (2016)
  - Total: 443,000
  - Density: 24.6/km^{2} (64/sq mi)
- Demonym(s): Bahamian, Turks Islander, Caicos Islander
- Time zone: UTC−05:00 (EST)
  - Summer (DST): UTC−04:00 (EDT)

The Lucayan Archipelago, also known as the Bahamian Archipelago, is an island group comprising the sovereign nation of the Bahamas and the British Overseas Territory of the Turks and Caicos Islands in the North Atlantic Ocean. The archipelago is in the Caribbean region, stretching from south-east of Florida in the mainland United States to northern Hispaniola. There are about 740 islands and 2,400 cays, of which only 38 are inhabited.

== History ==
The Lucayan Archipelago was first inhabited by the Lucayan people, a branch of the Taíno, who settled the islands from the 8th century CE to 16th century CE. They were the first Indigenous Americans encountered by Christopher Columbus in October 1492. Shortly after the contact, the Spaniards started enslaving the Lucayans, leading to their complete eradication from some of the islands by 1520. The Lucayan culture had its own language, government, customs, and traditions, and they engaged in extensive trade routes using dug-out canoes.

== Geography ==
The Lucayan island group comprising the sovereign nation of Bahamas and the British Overseas Territory of the Turks and Caicos Islands is located in the North Atlantic Ocean. Part of the Caribbean region, it stretches over 1,000 km (620 mi) from south-east of Florida in the mainland United States to northern Hispaniola, and lies to the north of Cuba and the Antilles. The archipelago consists of about 740 islands and 2,400 cays, with only 38 inhabited. About 700 of these islands and most of the cays are part of Bahamas, covering an area of 13,880 km^{2} (5,360 sq mi). These include 30 populated islands including the New Providence Island, home to the largest city of Nassau, and Andros, the largest island in the chain. The Turks and Caicos Islands comprises 40 islands and cays, eight of which are inhabited. It spans about 948 km^{2} (366 sq mi), and include the major islands of Providenciales, North Caicos, and Grand Turk.

The Mouchoir Bank, the Silver Bank, and the Navidad Bank are a submerged continuation of the archipelago, to the southeast of the Turks and Caicos Islands. The islands are situated on two large landforms consisting of limestone and coral formations. Most of the islands are low lying with the highest point, Mount Alvernia on Cat Island, reaching 63 m (207 ft) above the sea level. It has a tropical climate, characterized by warm temperatures, high humidity, and distinct wet and dry seasons. The archipelago also encounters tropical cyclones and hurricanes, which often restructure the geography of the islands.

=== Islands ===
The Lucayan Archipelago was named for the original native Lucayan people. Julian Granberry and Gary Vescelius suggest the following Lucayan (Taíno) etymologies for various Lucayan islands.

Indigenous name	Modern name	Lucayan form	Meaning
Inagua	Inagua	i+na+wa	Small Eastern Land
Baneque	Inagua	ba+ne+ke	Big Water Island
Guanahaní	Little Inagua	wa+na+ha+ni	Small Upper Waters Land
Utiaquia	Ragged Island	huti+ya+kaya	Western Hutia Island
Jume(n)to	Crooked/Jumento	ha+wo+ma+te	Upper Land of the Middle Distance
Curateo	Exuma	ko+ra+te+wo	Outer Far Distant Land
Guaratía	Exuma	wa+ra+te+ya	Far Distant Land
Babueca	Turks Bank	ba+we+ka	Large Northern Basin
Cacina	Big Sand Cay	ka+si+na	Little Northern Sand
Canamani	Salt Cay	ka+na+ma+ni	Small Northern Mid-Waters
Cacumani	Salt Cay	ka+ko+ma+ni	Mid-Waters Northern Outlier
Macareque	Cotton Cay	Ma+ka+ri+ke	Middle Northern Land
Amuana	Grand Turk	aba+wa+na	First Small Land
Caciba	South Caicos	ka+siba	Northern Rocky
Guana	East Caicos	wa+na	Small Country
Aniana	Middle Caicos	a+ni+ya+na	Small Far Waters
Caicos	North Caicos	ka+i+ko	Nearby Northern Outlier
Buiana	Pine Cay	bu+ya+na	Small Western Home
Boniana	Pine Cays	bo+ni+ya+na	Small Western Waters Home
Yucanacan	Providenciales	yuka+na+ka	The Peoples Small Northern [Land]
Ianicana	Providenciales	ya+ni+ka+na	Far Waters Smaller [Land]
Macubiza	West Caicos	ma+ko+bi+sa	Mid Unsettled Outlier
Mayaguana	Mayaguana	ma+ya+wa+na	Lesser Midwestern Land
Amaguayo	Plana Cays	a+ma+wa+yo	Toward the Middle Lands
Yabaque	Acklins Island	ya+ba+ke	Large Western Land
Samana	Samana	sa+ma+na	Small Middle Forest
Yuma	Long Island	yu+ma	Higher Middle
Manigua	Rum Cay	ma+ni+wa	Mid Waters Land
Guanahaní	San Salvador	wa+na+ha+hi	Small Upper Waters Land
Guateo	Little San Salvador	wa+te+yo	Toward the Distant Land
Guanima	Cat Island	wa+ni+ma	Middle Waters Land
Ayrabo	Great Guana Cay	ay+ra+bo	Far Distant Home
Nema	New Providence	ne+ma	Middle Waters
Ciguateo	Eleuthera	siba+te+wo	Distant Rocky Place
Lucayoneque	Great Abaco	luka+ya+ne+ke	The People's Distant Waters Land
Bahama	Grand Bahama	ba+ha+ma	Large Upper Middle [Land]
Habacoa	Andros	ha+ba+ko+wa	Large Upper Outlier Land
Canimisi	Williams Island	ka+ni+misi	Northern Waters Swamp
Bimini	Bimini	bimini	The Twins

== Flora and fauna ==
The Lucayan Archipelago has a marine ecosystem that supports varies aquatic resident communities including large species such as spotted dolphins, common bottlenose dolphins, and humpback whales. Various frogs, lizards, nonpoisonous snakes, and several species of bats can be found in coastal caves. The islands are also home to diverse birdlife.

== See also ==
- List of Caribbean islands
- West Indies
