= Silver Bank =

Submerged bank in the Atlantic Ocean

Native name: Banco de la Plata Submerged bank
- Location within the Caribbean

Geography
- Location: Caribbean
- Coordinates: 20°32′30″N 69°42′00″W
- Area: 1,680 km^{2} (650 sq mi)

Administration
- Dominican Republic

Additional information
- Time zone: Eastern Caribbean Time Zone (UTC−04:00)

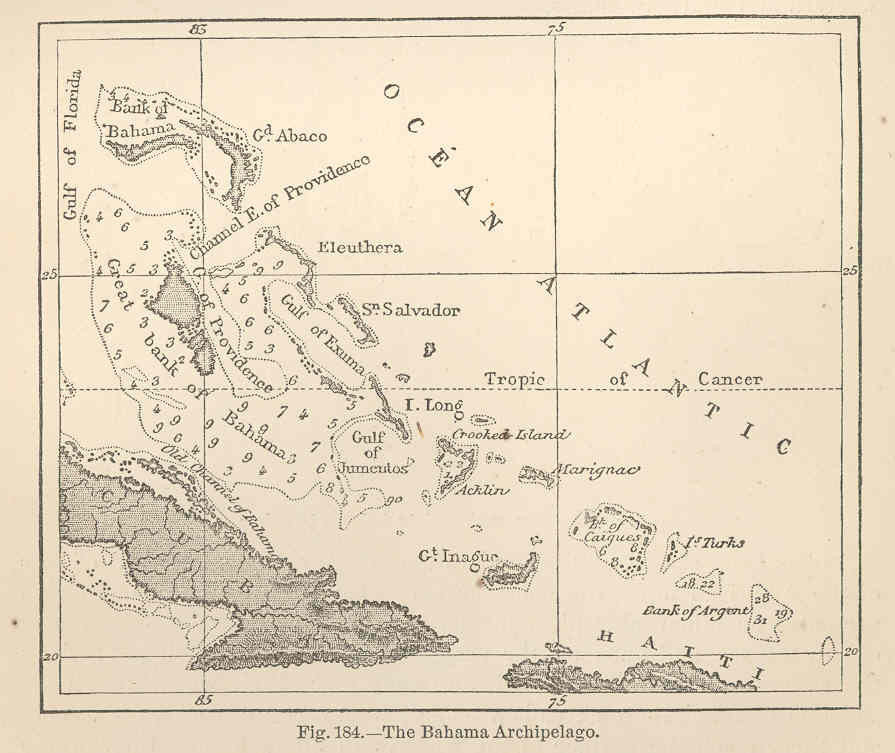
Silver Bank as Bank of Argent in the lower right of an 1873 map of the Bahamas.

Silver Bank (Spanish: Banco de la Plata) is a submerged bank in the Atlantic Ocean north of the Dominican Republic and southeast of the territory of Turks and Caicos Islands. It covers an area of 1,680 square kilometres (649 square miles). It is separated from Mouchoir Bank in the west by Silver Bank Passage, and from Navidad Bank in the east by Navidad Bank Passage.

== Geography ==
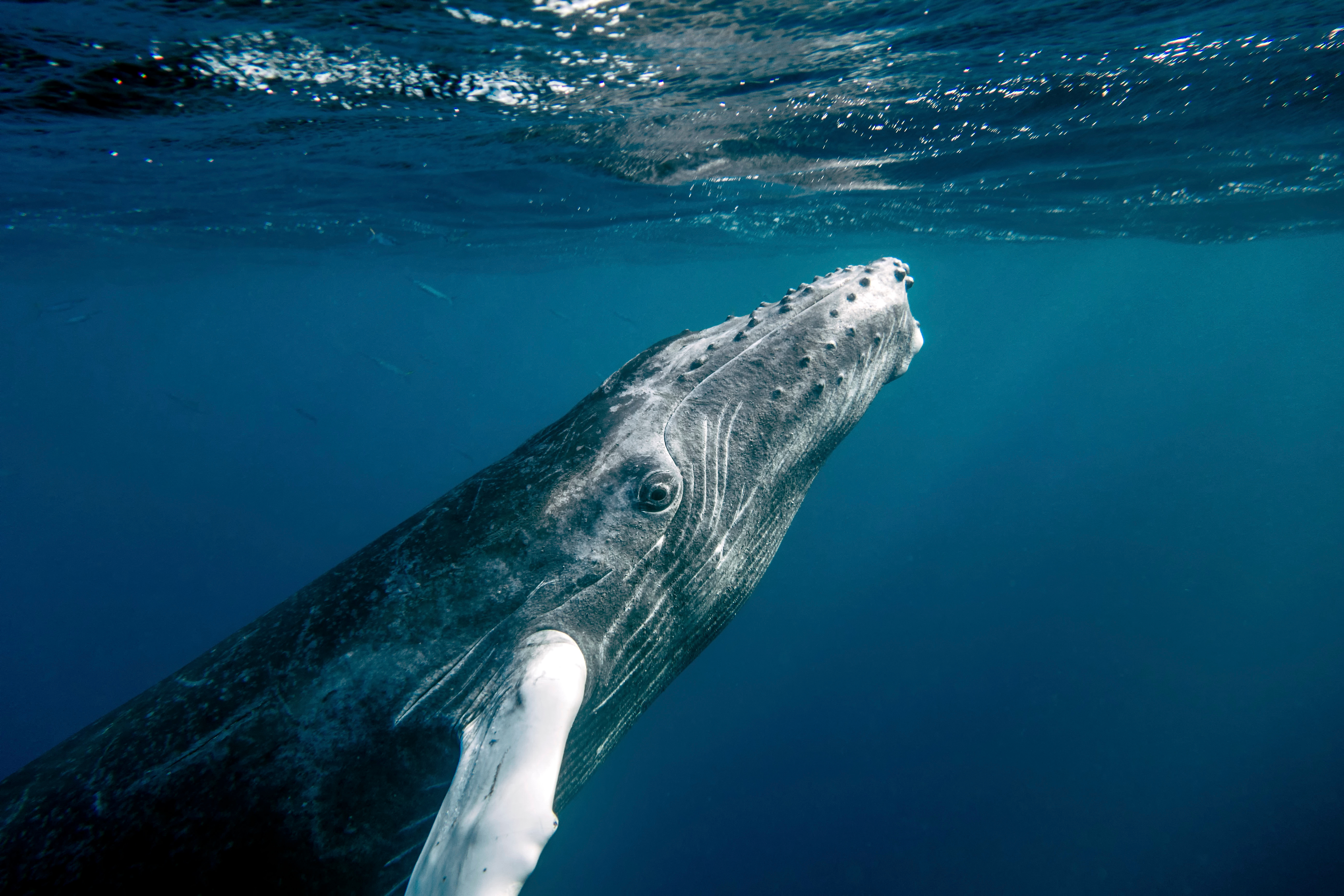
Humpback whale calf at South Bank

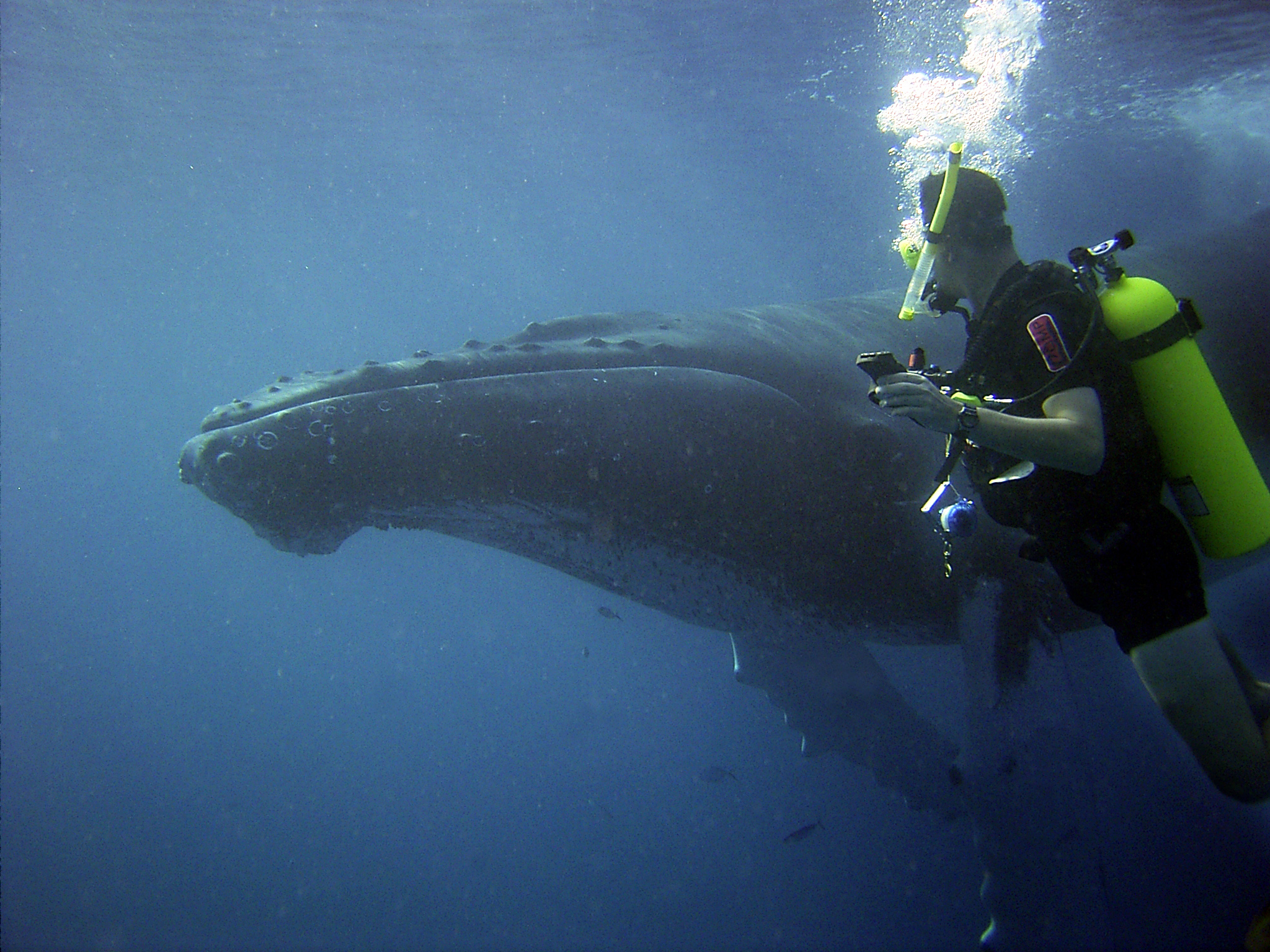

Silver Bank is a shallow underwater carbonate platform that almost reaches the ocean's surface in certain areas (60 feet (18 metres) deep in the shallow parts), but is mostly submerged. In its northern reaches, many coral heads reach the ocean surface, especially at low tide. Lying amongst the coral heads is the wrecked freighter Polyxeni, most of which rests above the surface. Persons can board the Polyxeni only with governmental permission.

Because the Silver Bank is shallow, it is not suitable for passage of large ships. In fact, any boat in the area should obtain permission before entering the bank.

The area is considered part of the Dominican Republic, as is Navidad Bank east of it. On Oct. 14, 1986, the Dominican Republic established the Silver and Navidad Bank Sanctuary (Santuario de los Bancos de la Plata y de la Navidad) to protect the area as a safe haven for sea mammals. On July 5, 1996, a Dominican presidential decree enlarged the area, declaring it the 'Sanctuary for Marine Mammals' (Santuario de Mamíferos Marinos).

The Silver Bank has long been a breeding and calving area for humpback whales. As such, tourism centers around tours to view the whales and other wildlife.

Just to the southeast is Navidad Bank, also under the jurisdiction of the Dominican Republic.

The Silver Bank, the Navidad Bank, as well as the Mouchoir Bank further northwest, plus the Turks and Caicos Islands, are geographically considered a continuation of the Lucayan Archipelago.

== See also ==
- Navidad Bank
