= Mouchoir Bank =

Submerged bank in the Turks and Caicos Islands

Native name: Banco de Pañuelo Blanco Submerged bank
- Location within the Caribbean

Geography
- Location: Caribbean
- Coordinates: 20°57′00″N 70°42′00″W
- Area: 960 km^{2} (370 sq mi)

Administration
- Turks and Caicos Islands

Additional information
- Time zone: Eastern Caribbean Time Zone (UTC−04:00)

Nautical chart showing the Mouchoir Bank on the right between Turks Islands and Silver Bank

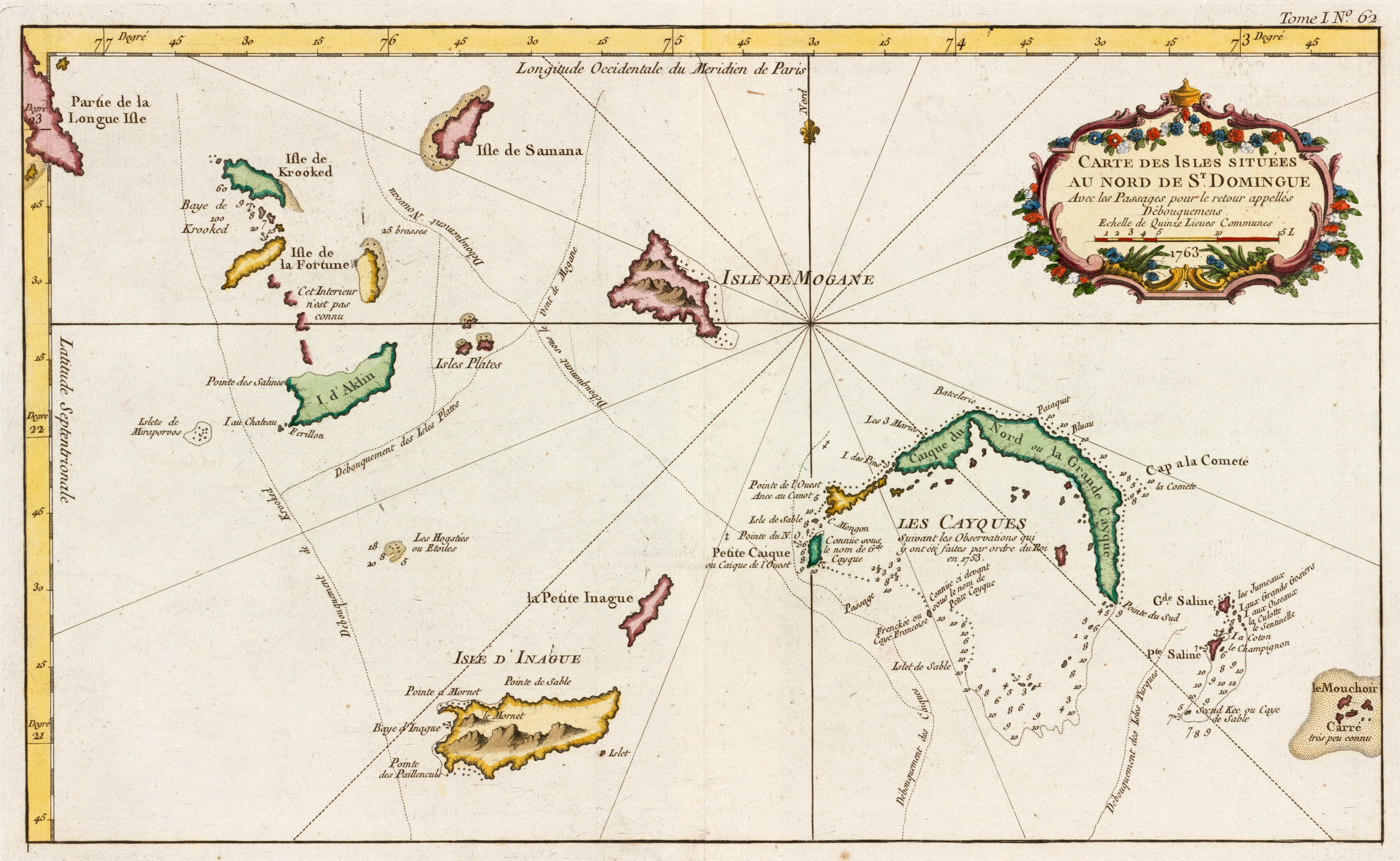
1773 map by Jacques-Nicolas Bellin showing leMouchoir Carré, tres peu connu = very little known as if with islands, which in reality do not exist

Mouchoir Bank, in Spanish also called Banco de Pañuelo Blanco, is a submerged bank that is part of the Turks and Caicos Islands and falls within its exclusive economic zone.

The bank, located southeast of the Turks islands, is the geographic continuation of the carbonate island archipelago comprising the Bahamas, Turks and Caicos Islands, the Silver Bank, and the Navidad Bank.

== Geography ==
Much of the north side of the bank is awash in two groupings of coral reef. A 1.8 m deep rock lies between the two groupings. There are numerous shallow patches on the bank which break. North East Breaker is a dangerous rock in the northeast.

The bank covers an area of 960 km^{2}. Mouchoir Passage, which separates Mouchoir Bank from the Turks Islands further northwest, is about 26 kilometres (16 mi) wide and very deep. Silver Bank Passage separates Mouchoir Bank from Silver Bank further southeast; the latter belongs to the Dominican Republic's EEZ.

== See also ==
- Silver Bank
- Navidad Bank
