= Navidad Bank =

Navidad Bank Banco de la Navidad
- Submerged bank
- Location within the Dominican Republic
- Coordinates: 20°01′N 68°51′W
- Country: Dominican Republic

Area
  - Total: 650 km^{2} (250 sq mi)

Languages
  - Official: Spanish
- Time zone: UTC−04:00 (Eastern Caribbean Time Zone)

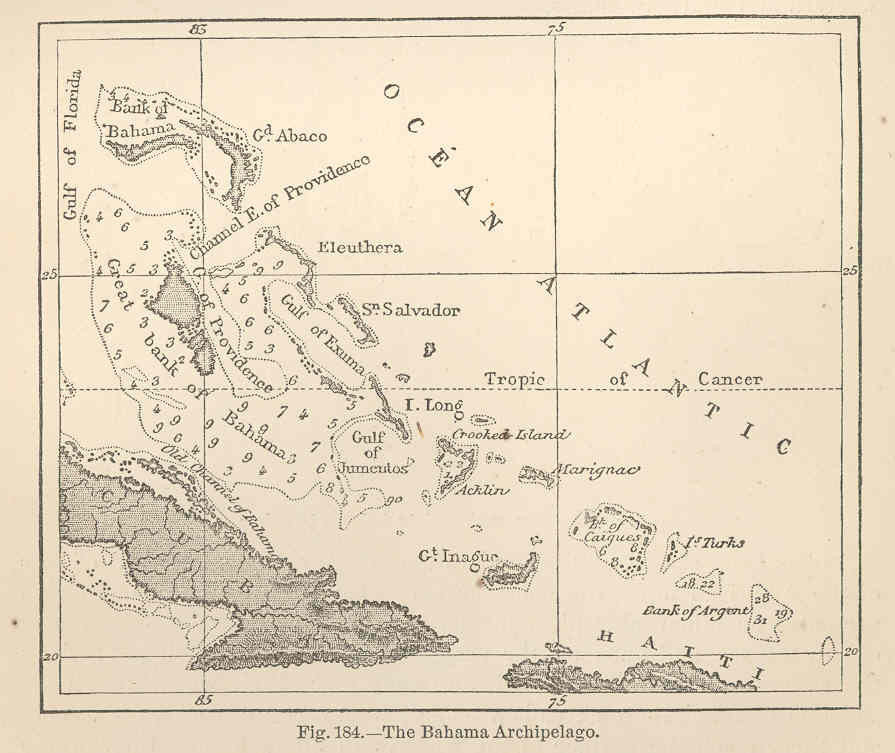
Navidad Bank in the lower right corner of an 1873 map of the Bahamas.

Navidad Bank (Spanish: Banco de la Navidad) is a submerged bank in the Atlantic Ocean north of the Dominican Republic and southeast of the Territory of Turks & Caicos. It is separated from Silver Bank by the wide Navidad Bank Passage.

== Geography ==
Navidad Bank is a shallow underwater area composed of coral and sand that almost reaches the ocean's surface, but is wholly submerged. It covers an area of 650 km^{2} (251 sq mi). At low tide, a few small locations appear awash at the water's surface. General depths are less than 36.6 metres (120.1 feet). There is a least-known depth of 12.8 metres (42.0 feet) located on the east side of the north end of the bank. It is not suitable for boating navigation of any kind, except by small craft, whose operators must be extremely careful. From the earliest colonial times, Navidad Bank has been the scene of multiple shipwrecks.

This area is considered part of the Dominican Republic. A Dominican presidential decree on July 5, 1996, included the area in the Sanctuary for the Marine Mammals of the Dominican Republic.

Navidad Bank has a wealth of corals and is a safe haven for marine mammals, including the humpback whale. The humpback whales have long used the bank as a breeding and calving ground. As such, tourism focuses on tours to view the whales and other sea life. The Bank is visited by scuba divers.

Just to the northwest is the Silver Bank (Spanish: Banco de la Plata), also under the jurisdiction of the Dominican Republic.

Navidad Bank, Silver Bank, as well as Mouchoir Bank further northwest, plus the Turks and Caicos Islands, are considered a geographic continuation of the Lucayan Archipelago.
