= Paleofauna of the Mazon Creek fossil beds =

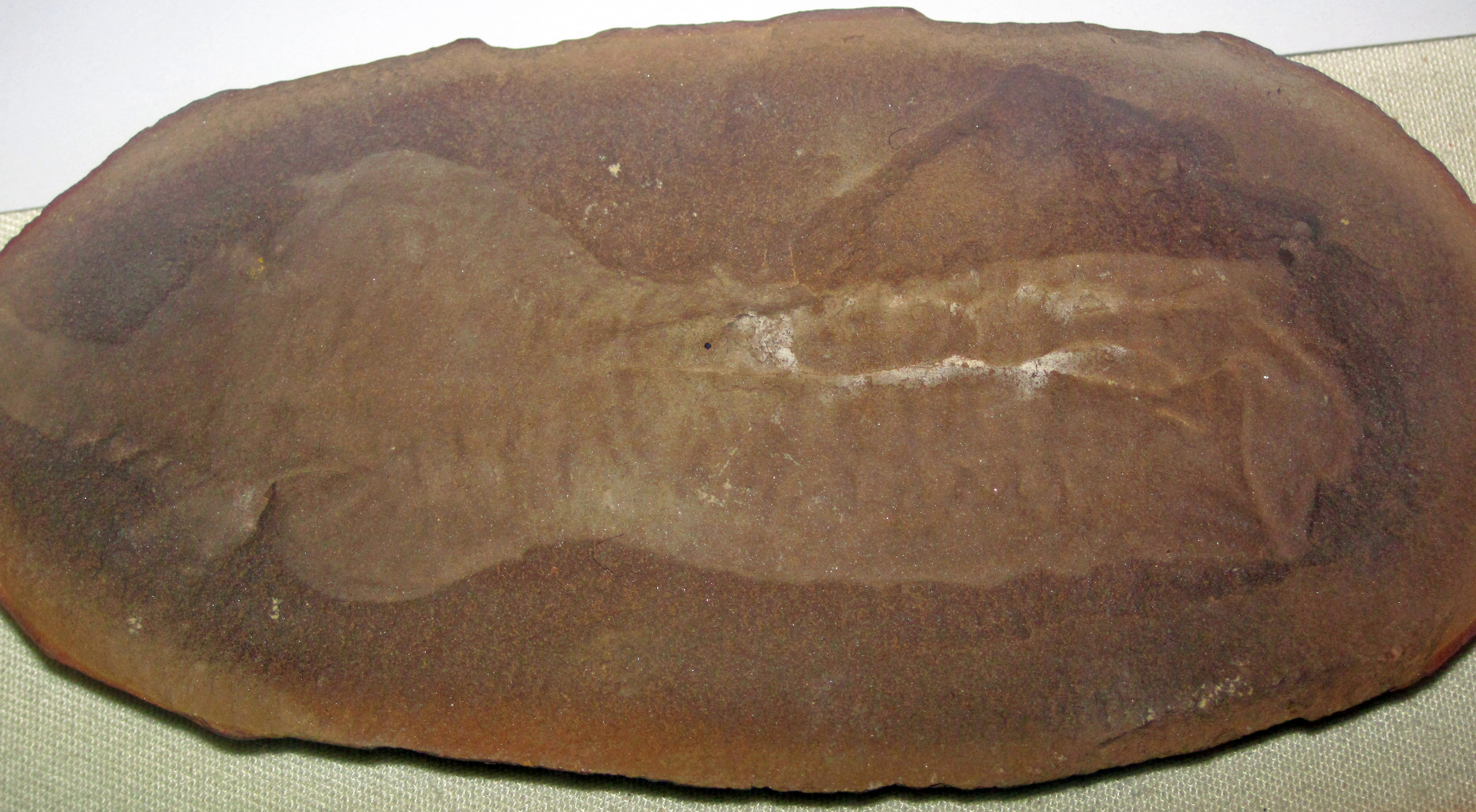
Fossil specimen of Tullimonstrum gregarium, perhaps the most infamous, and well-known organism from the Mazon Creek Fossil Beds.

This is a list of the fauna of the Mazon Creek fossil beds, a Carboniferous lagerstätte located in Grundy County, Illinois. The site is famous for its exceptional preservation of soft bodied fossils inside of ironstone concretions, and was one of the first fossil sites discovered to preserve soft bodied fossils.

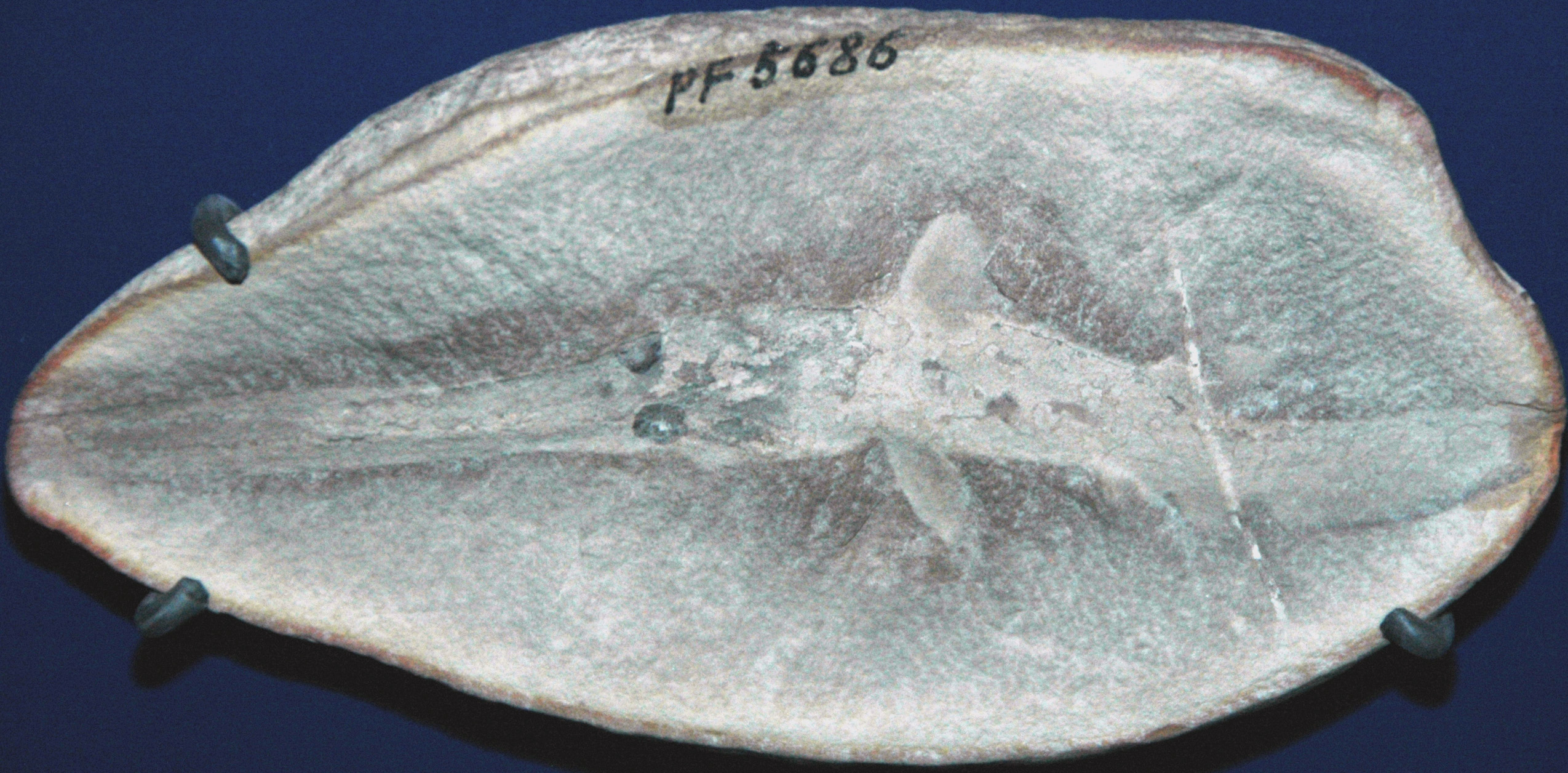
Fossil specimen of a young Bandringa rayi, a bizarre elasmobranch, and another notable taxon from Mazon Creek

The Mazon Creek fossil beds are around 309-307 million years old, being approximately Moscovian in age. During the Carboniferous, this area was a lush, tropical delta system, about 10° north latitude of the equator. This ecosystem was formed by at least one river system that flowed in from the northeastern united states and met the ocean to form an Estuarine environment. This large amount of habitat led to the creation of a very diverse ecosystem, which has been divided into two main sections, the marine Essex fauna, and the terrestrial/freshwater Braidwood fauna. Since the site's discovery in the early 20th century, more than 700 species of flora and fauna have been discovered, some of which have only been found at this site. Because of the diverse habitat types, many different groups, such as arthropods, mollusks, hemichordates, cnidarians, chondrichthyans, actinopterygians, tetrapods and various other groups are represented.

== Fauna ==
=== Cnidaria ===
A number of Cnidarians are known from Mazon Creek, and show the diversity of taxa in the ecosystem.

Cnidaria
Genus	Clade	Higher taxon	Species	Notes	Images
Essexella	Cnidaria	Actiniaria	E. asherae	One of the most abundant taxa from Mazon Creek, Originally described as a scyphozoan in 1979, but was later re-described as an actiniarian in 2023	
Reticulomedusa	Cnidaria	Incertae sedis	R. greenei	Another cnidarian once described as a scyphozoan, but most likely represents a synonym of Essexella	
Anthracomedusa	Cnidaria	Cubozoa	A. turnbulli	A jellyfish, though not a member of the Scyphozoa (true jellyfish) but instead a cubozoan (box jellyfish)	
Octomedusa	Cnidaria	Coronatae?	O. pieckorum	A bizarre scyphozoan, originally considered to be a basal coronatan (crown jellyfish), however this has been questioned by later studies	
Drevotella	Cnidaria	Hydroidolina	D. proteana	A cnidarian, and a member of the Hydroidolina within the Hydrozoa	
Mazohydra	Cnidaria	Hydroidolina	M. megabertha	Another hydrozoan, and one of the first fossil taxa from the class to be discovered	

=== Annelida ===
A number of annelid worms are known from Mazon Creek.

Annelida
Genus	Clade	Higher taxon	Species	Notes	Images
Coprinoscolex	Annelida	Echiura	C. ellogimus	Originally considered to be the oldest definitive echiuran (spoon worms), before the discovery of taxa from Castle Bank	
Rhaphidiophorus	Annelida	Amphinomida	R. hystrix	A member of the Amphinomida, and one of the earliest known members of the group, nicknamed the 'Oliver Hardy Worm'	
Esconites	Annelida	Eunicida	E. zelus	A member of the Eunicida, showing the distinctive mouthparts, of the group, and reaches around 14 cm.	
Mazovermes	Annelida	incertae sedis	M. magnaterminus	A bizarre annelid featuring broad posterior parapodia and segments, giving it a very distinctive appearance compared to other fossil polychaetes	
Mazopherusa	Annelida	Terebellida	M. prinosi	A member of the Flabelligeridae family (fan worms), and one of the few known fossil taxa from the family	
Didontogaster	Annelida	Phyllodocida	D. cordylina	A phyllodocid often nicknamed the 'Tummy Tooth Worm', named after the swollen section of its body containing the worms mouthparts	
Levisettius	Annelida	Phyllodocida	L. campylonectus	A phyllodocid often nicknamed the 'Riccardo Worm'	
Astreptoscolex	Annelida	Phyllodocida	A. anasillosus	A phyllodocid often nicknamed the 'Plain Worm'	
Rutellifrons	Annelida	Phyllodocida	R. wolfforum	A phyllodocid often nicknamed the 'Shovel Nose Worm'	
Pieckonia	Annelida	Phyllodocida	P. helenae	A phyllodocid often nicknamed the 'Fish Worm'	
Fossundecima	Annelida	Phyllodocida	F. konecniorum	A phyllodocid often nicknamed the 'Simple Jaw Worm', one of the most common worms of the Essex Fauna	
Dryptoscolex	Annelida	Phyllodocida	D. matthiesae	A phyllodocid often nicknamed the 'Rat Worm'	
Hystriciola	Annelida	Phyllodocida	H. delicatula	A phyllodocid often nicknamed the 'Baby Tooth Worm'	
Fastuoscolex	Annelida	Phyllodocida	F. gemmatus	A phyllodocid often nicknamed the 'Papillae Worm'	

=== Mollusca ===
A very large number of Mollusks are known from Mazon Creek, with Multiple classes being represented.

==== Polyplacophora and Gastropoda ====
Various polyplacophorans (chitons) and gastropods (snails and their relatives) are known from the area.

Polyplacophora and Gastropoda
Genus	Clade	Higher taxon	Species	Notes	Images
Glaphurochiton	Polyplacophora	Lepidopleuridae	G. concinnus	A chiton found with a very well-preserved radula, which is almost identical to that of modern species	
Euphemites	Gastropoda (?)	Euphemitidae	E. richardsoni	A bizarre mollusk belonging to the Bellerophontida, whose taxonomy has not yet been fully resolved	
Hypeselentoma	Gastropoda	Gosseletinidae	H. cf. perhumerosa	A gosseletinid gastropod known from various other localities	
Straparollus	Gastropoda	Straparollinidae	S. sp.		
Naticopsis	Gastropoda	Neritopsidae	N. sp.	A gastropod who still has modern relatives in the same family	
Strobeus	Gastropoda	Soleniscidae	S. cf. primigenius		

==== Bivalvia ====
A large number of bivalves are known from Mazon Creek, and by far represent the most diverse and abundant group of mollusks from the area.

Bivalvia
Genus	Clade	Higher taxon	Species	Notes	Images
Mazonomya	Solemyida	Solemyidae	M. mazonensis	A solemyid, and one of the most abundant bivalves from Mazon Creek, known from the Chowder Flats locality among others, and often nicknamed 'Clam-Clam'	
Acharax	Solemyida	Solemyidae	A. radiata; A. trapezoides	Members of the still living genus Acharax, and both known from the Essex Fauna	
Myalina	Pteriida	Myalinidae	M. meeki; M. sp.	Originally described as 'Myalinella', and like modern relatives, are known for their elongated, wing-like shells	
Anthraconaia	Pteriida	Myalinidae	A. ohioensis	Known for its superficial resemblance to some modern mussels	
Anthraconauta	Pteriida	Myalinidae	A. sp.	Known for its resemblance to Anthraconaia	
Leptodesma	Pteriida	Myalinidae	L. ohioensis	A myalinid with a fossil record going back to the Silurian	
Posidonia	Pteriida	Myalinidae	P. fracta		
Aviculopecten	Pectinida	Aviculopectinidae	A. mazonensis	A wide ranging, and diverse genus of scallop, with the youngest record being in the upper Triassic	
Acanthopecten	Pectinida	Aviculopectinidae	A. sp.	A similar scallop to the contemporary Aviculopecten, and a member of the same family	
Heteropecten	Pectinida	Aviculopectinidae	H. exemplarius	Originally considered a synonym of Aviculopecten, before being recognized as a distinct taxon	
Euchondria	Pectinida	Aviculopectinidae	E. pellucida	This species usually attains lengths of 9–10 mm, while other species in the genus have been known to exceed 25 mm	
Dunbarella	Pectinida	Pterinopectinidae	D. striata; D. sp.	Some species in this genus may have been able to swim away from predators like extant taxa	
Palaeolima	Limida	Limidae	P. retifera	An early member of the limidae, also known as file shells	
Schizodus	Trigoniida	Schizodidae	S. cf. wheeleri; S. cf. affinis	An example of a schizodont, bivalves possessing reverse v-shaped scissurate hinge teeth	
Permophorus	Venerida	Permophoridae	P. spinulosa; P. sp.	Known for its elongated, and thick valves, and known throughout the Carboniferous	
Edmondia	Adapedonta	Edmondiidae	E. ovata; E. oblonga; E. aspinwallensis	A distant relative of modern razor shells	
Sedgwickia	Adapedonta	Edmondiidae	S. sp.	Another member of the Edmondiidae, and is rather uncommon at Mazon Creek	
Grammysioidea	Adapedonta	Edmondiidae	G. hayi	A rarely found bivalve at Mazon Creek	

==== Cephalopoda ====
A number of cephalopods are known from Mazon Creek, including shelled taxa, and basal coleoids.

Cephalopoda
Genus	Clade	Higher taxon	Species	Notes	Images
Saundersites	Coleoidea	Belemnoidea	S. illinoisiensis	A genus of basal coleoid within the Belemnoidea, however it is too poorly understood for a more specific placement, known from arms and radulas	
Paleocadmus	Nautiloidea	Incertae sedis	P. herdinae; P. pohli	A nautiloid from mazon creek known mainly from isolated radulas and beaks, however, the species P. pohli is known from a body outline. The controversial taxon Pohlsepia, which was originally interpreted as an octopus of the Cirrina suborder, has since been synonymized with this taxon	
Bactrites	Neocephalopoda	Bactritidae	B. sp.	A straight shelled (orthoconic) cephalopod, and a member of the Bactritida	
Wiedeyoceras	Ammonoidea	Wiedeyoceratidae	W. sp.	A member of the Ammonoidea, more specifically a goniatite. Fossils of this genus have been tentatively reported from Mazon Creek	
Unidentified schistoceratid	Ammonoidea	Schistoceratidae	Schistoceratid. sp	Fossils from this site have been placed within the goniatite family Schistoceratidae, however genus level identification has not been found	
Stearoceras	Nautiloidea	Grypoceratidae	S. sp.	A coil-shelled nautiloid, and a distant relative of modern nautilids	
Titanoceras	Nautiloidea	Grypoceratidae	T. sp.	A fairly large sized member of the Grypoceratidae, with a shell diameter of around 8 in (20 cm) being recorded	

=== Brachiopoda ===
A small number of brachiopods are known from Mazon Creek.

Brachiopoda
Genus	Clade	Higher taxon	Species	Notes	Images
Lingula (?)	Brachiopoda	Lingulida	L. sp.	A common brachiopod in the fossil record, however the majority of specimens most likely represent unrelated species, and definitive specimens of the genus are only known from the Cenozoic	
Orbiculoidea	Brachiopoda	Discinida	O. sp.	Another common brachiopod in the fossil record, known for its near circular, disk-shaped shell	
Unidentified chonetoids	Brachiopoda	Strophomenida	Various species	Several undescribed brachiopods in Strophomenida order are known from the site	

=== Echinodermata ===
Echinoderms are an undiverse faunal component of Mazon Creek.

Echinoderms
Genus	Clade	Higher taxon	Species	Notes	Images
Achistrum	Holothuroidea	Achistridae	A. sp.	A taxon of footless (without tube feet) sea cucumber known from various species from both North America and Europe	
Unidentified crinoids	Crinoidea	Various groups	Various species	A number of undescribed crinoids with stalks (sea lilies) are known from the area	

=== Non-arthropod panarthropoda ===
A small number of non-arthropod panarthropods (notably lobopodians and similar taxa) are known from Mazon Creek.

Non-arthropod panarthropoda
Genus	Clade	Higher taxon	Species	Notes	Images
Carbotubulus	Panarthropoda	Hallucigeniidae?	C. waloszeki	A long-legged lobopodianns originally assigned to Hallucigeniidae, however this has been questioned by later studies	
Helenodora	Lobopodia	Onychophora (Stem-group)	* H. inopinata	Controversial animal that may be an onychophoran (velvet worm), was previously considered (albeit controversially) a synonym of the contemporary Ilyodes	
Ilyodes	Panarthropoda	Incertae sedis	I. divisa; I. elongata	Originally named as a myriapod in 1890. However, it may represent a nomen dubium, due to neither species being properly diagnosed	
Palaeocampa	Panarthropoda	Aysheaiidae	P. anthrax	First known freshwater and toxic lobopodian, and the youngest known aysheaiid. Bears spines unlike any other known animal	

=== Artiopoda ===
The artiopoda (including trilobites and their close relatives) are very rare from Mazon Creek, with only a singular taxon represented.

Artiopoda
Genus	Clade	Higher taxon	Species	Notes	Images
Tardisia	Artiopoda	Vicissicaudata	T. broedeae	Latest known non-trilobite artiopod, and a close relative of the Cheloniellida	

=== Chelicerata ===
A high number of arthropods belonging to the chelicerata subphylum are known from Mazon Creek.

Chelicerata
Genus	Clade	Higher taxon	Species	Notes	Images
Adelophthalmus	Eurypterida	Adelophthalmidae	A. mazonensis	The only eurypterid from Mazon Creek, and the youngest member of the Eurypterina	
Euproops	Xiphosura	Belinuridae	E. danae	A genus of xiphosurid related to modern horseshoe crabs, interestingly, juveniles may have been semi-aquatic, due to their bristle covered undersides	
Paleolimulus	Xiphosura	Paleolimulidae	P. sp.	A wide ranging, and well known genus of xiphosuran, known from number of other deposits	

==== Arachnida ====
A large number of arachnids are known from Mazon Creek, with some belonging to extinct groups, while others represent some of the earliest appearances of crown-group lineages.

Arachnida
Genus	Clade	Higher taxon	Species	Notes	Images
Aphantomartus	Trigonotarbida	Aphantomartidae	A. pustulatus	A very small member of the Trigonotarbida, species from this genus are also known from areas outside of North America, including parts of Europe	
Pleophrynus	Trigonotarbida	Eophrynidae	P. verrucosus	Another small sized trigonotarbid, its holotype specimen (ISM 14873) was discovered at Mazon Creek	
Unidentified anthracomartid	Trigonotarbida	Anthracomartidae	Anthracomartid. sp	An unidentified trigonotarbid from the Anthracomartidae family, and is very rare	
Lissomartus	Trigonotarbida	Lissomartidae	L. carbonarius; L. schucherti	A trigonotarbid, with both species known from North America, and belongs to its own family	
Geralinura	Uropygi	Incertae sedis	G. carbonaria	An early whip scorpion, which possessed spined and non-chelate pedipalps, unlike modern genera	
Prothelyphonus	Uropygi	Incertae sedis	P. sp.	A large, nearly 30 mm long whip scorpion, and one of the largest known members of its group from the Paleozoic	
Weygoldtina	Amblypygi	Weygoldtinidae	W. scudderi	A tailless whip scorpion, originally described under the Graeophonus genus, however, it was redescribed as its own taxon in 2018, with a second species known from Europe	
Thelyphrynus	Amblypygi	Incertae sedis	T. elongatus	Another amblypygid, distinguished by its bean shaped cephalothorax and the seeming lack of eyes	
Arthrolycosa	Araneae (?)	Arthrolycosidae	A. antiqua	A bizarre arachnid of the Arthrolycosidae family, suggested to be basal true spiders, however this remains somewhat contentious	
Curculioides	Ricinulei	Curculioididae	C. mcluckiei; C. scaber; C. gigas	A member of the Ricinulei, and known in Mazon Creek from three species, the one pictured here is C. scaber	
Amarixys	Ricinulei	Curculioididae	A. sulcata; A. gracillis; A. stellaris	Another ricinuleid known from three species	
Poliochera	Ricinulei	Poliocheridae	P. glabra; P. gibbsi	Various species are known from other regions of North America	
Protosolpuga	Solifugae	Protosolpugidae	P. carbonaria	The only known member of the Solifugae from the site, and a very rare taxon at Mazon Creek	
Eoscorpius	Scorpiones	Eoscorpiidae	E. carbonarius; E. cf. pulcher; E. mucronatus	A wide ranging, and successful scorpion known from various localities from the lower Carboniferous-Lower Permian, with the type fossil coming from Mazon Creek	
Palaeobuthus	Scorpiones	Palaeobuthidae	P. distinctus	A modest sized scorpion, with the holotype specimen potentially reaching a length of around 55 mm long	
Kronoscorpio	Scorpiones	Kronoscorpionidae	K. danielsi	Another scorpion, and a more recent taxon described by Dunlop et al. 2013	
Palaeopisthacanthus	Scorpiones	Palaeopisthacanthidae	P. schucherti	A scorpion known from at least a very well-preserved holotype specimen	
Buthiscorpius	Scorpiones	Buthiscorpiidae	B. cf. lemayi	Mazon creek is the type locality for this genus	
Eoctenus	Scorpiones	Eoctonidae	E. minatus	The holotype of this taxon (YPM 131) was described by Petrunkevitch (1913)	
Hadrachne	Phalangiotarbida	Architarbidae	H. horribilis	This genus may represent a very old instar of the contemporary Architarbus	
Paratarbus	Phalangiotarbida	Architarbidae	P. carbonarius	Known mainly for its somewhat convex prosomal margin	
Mesotarbus	Phalangiotarbida	Architarbidae	M. extraneus	The reconstruction to the right does not depict the species from Mazon Creek	
Architarbus	Phalangiotarbida	Architarbidae	A. rotundatus	The namesake taxon of the Architarbidae family	
Mazonitarbus	Phalangiotarbida	Architarbidae	M. minor	Similarly to Hadrachne, this taxon may represent an instar of Architarbus	
Bicarinitarbus	Phalangiotarbida	Architarbidae	B. pieckorum	The opisthosoma of this taxon possesses a pair of keels	
Phalangiotarbus	Phalangiotarbida	Architarbidae	P. lacoei	The namesake taxon of its order	
Nemastomoides	Opiliones	Nemastomoididae	N. longipes	An early harvestmen, with two valid species, and one which has since been redescribed as a phalangiotarbid	
Douglassarachne	Arachnida	Pantetrapulmonata	D. acanthopoda	A unique species distinguished by the long spines on its limbs, it is unclear where this species places specifically within Arachnida	

=== Mandibulata ===
A very large number of arthropods belonging to the mandibulata are known from Mazon Creek.

Mandibulata
Genus	Clade	Higher taxon	Species	Notes	Images
Concavicaris?	Thylacocephala	Concavicarida	C. remipes	Bears an unusual terminal structure which may be a caudal furca. The species C. remipes may not be a thylacocephalan at all and instead may represent a myodocopan	
Quadrangulucaris	Thylacocephala	Concavicarida	Q. georgeorum	Originally one of the many thylacocephalans lumped into Concavicaris, this species would be redescribed as a separate taxon in July 2026. Another species, Q. rostellata, is also known from the larger Carbondale Formation, but is instead known from the separate Kewanee Group	Concavicaris georgeorum reconstruction
Convexicaris	Thylacocephala	Concavicarida	C. mazonensis	Bears eight pairs of trunk appendages	
Eodollocaris	Thylacocephala		E. keithflinti	Resembles Mesozoic thylacocephalans like Dollocaris	
Pieckoxerxes	Euthycarcinoidea	Incertae sedis	P. pieckoae	A euthycarcinoid (stem-myriapod), and like its relatives from Mazon Creek, is very rare	
Smithixerxes	Euthycarcinoidea	Kottixerxidae	S. juliarum	Another euthycarcinoid, known for its long telson and five tergites on its trunk region (which is a clear feature for distinguishing the Mazon Creek euthycarcinoids)	
Kottixerxes	Euthycarcinoidea	Kottixerxidae	K. gloriosus	Another rare euthycarcinoid, of which only two specimens have been documented	

==== Myriapoda ====
The myriapoda (centipedes, millipedes, and their close relatives) are known in moderately large numbers in Mazon Creek

Myriapoda
Genus	Clade	Higher taxon	Species	Notes	Images
Amynilyspes	Diplopoda	Amynilyspedida	A. wortheni	An early pill millipede which featured long spines and prominent eyes, also known from Europe	
Unidentified Amynilyspedid	Diplopoda	Amynilyspedida	Amynilyspedid. sp	A currently unnamed pill millipede which is notable due to its lack of spines	
Euphoberia	Diplopoda	Euphoberiidae	E. armigera	A basal, spiny millipede, curiously, juvenile individuals seemingly congregated together as a defense mechanism	
Acantherpestes	Diplopoda	Euphoberiidae	A. horridus; A. major; A. sp.	Another euphoberiid, known for its laterally facing spines, and its potential liking to more open habitats	
Myriacantherpestes	Diplopoda	Euphoberiidae	M. hystricosus; M. inequalis	A euphoberiid characterized by its long spines and more flattened body	
Xyloiulus	Diplopoda	Xyloiulidae	X. mazonus; X. sp.	A flat-backed millipede, originally placed within the Spirobolida, however is now considered a problematic member of the Juliformia	
Pleurojulus	Diplopoda	Pleurojulidae	P. cf. biornatus	A member of the Pleurojulida, a somewhat problematic group of millipedes whose relationship to other groups is unclear	
Zosterogrammus	Diplopoda	Zosterogrammidae	Z. stichostethus	A member of the Zosterogrammida, which superficially resemble modern polyzoniids, and extend from the Silurian-upper Carboniferous	
Arthropleura	Diplopoda	Arthropleuridae	A. cristata	A giant diplopodan, and one of the most well-known arthropods in the fossil record, primarily inhabited more open environments away from coal swamps, and was potentially amphibious	
Archiulus	Diplopoda	Helminthomorpha	A. glomeratus	A millipede of uncertain placement, and is not easily assignable to any order	
Mazoscolopendra	Chilopoda	Scolopendromorpha	M. richardsoni	A scolopendromorphid centipede of uncertain placement, however the original description suggested a placement within the Cryptopidae	
Palenarthrus	Chilopoda	Scolopendromorpha	P. impressus	Another scolopendromorphid whose further taxonomy is questioned	
Latzelia	Chilopoda	Latzeliidae	L. primordialis	A member of the Scutigeromorpha, and was first described in 1890, in honor of Austrian zoologist Robert Latzel	

==== Non-hexapod pancrustacea ====
A number of 'traditional' crustaceans are known from Mazon creek, with the majority belonging to extant groups.

Non-hexapod pancrustacea
Genus	Clade	Higher taxon	Species	Notes	Images
Cryptocaris	Remipedia	Enantiopoda	C. hootchi	A basal remipede, and a close relative of the only other known fossil remipede, Tesnusocaris	
Kallidecthes	Aeschronectida	Kallidecthidae	K. richardsoni	A member of the Aeschronectida, an extinct group distantly related to the stomatopods	
Tyrannophontes	Stomatopoda	Tyrannophontidae	T. theridion; T. gigantion	A basal mantis shrimp, unlike modern species, it seems that this taxon was most likely swimming above the seafloor, and was probably unable to have walked on the benthos	
Palaeocaris	Syncarida	Palaeocarididae	P. typus	A basal member of the Syncarida, also known from the older Manning Canyon Shale	
Acanthotelson	Syncarida	Acanthotelsonidae	A. stimpsoni	Another basal syncaridan, and one of the most common crustaceans known from Mazon Creek	
Palaeosyncaris	Syncarida	Palaeocaridacea	P. micra		
Belotelson	Belotelsonidea	Belotelsonidae	B. magister	One of the more well-known crustaceans from Mazon creek	
Lobetelson	Belotelsonidea	Belotelsonidae	L. mclaughlinae	Another belotelsonid, one of the major differences between it and the contemporary Belotelson, is the formers larger tail-fan	
Peachocaris	Lophogastrida	Peachocarididae	P. strongi	A member of the Lophogastrida, a group of shrimp-like crustaceans which are mainly confined to deep water pelagic marine environments in the present	
Anthracaris	Pygocephalomorpha	Pygocephalidae	A. gracilis	A peracaridian, and also known from deposits in Europe	
Mamayocaris	Pygocephalomorpha	Pygocephalidae	M. jaskoskii	Another member of the Pygocephalomorpha	
Anthracophausia	Mysidacea (?)	Incertae sedis	A. ingelsorum	a malacostracan of uncertain placement, potentially a member of the Mysidacea, but it's true placement is still problematic	
Essoidia	Mysidacea (?)	Incertae sedis	E. epiceron	Another potential mysidacean, often nicknamed the 'S-shrimp', due to its long posterior region and telson, often giving its fossils a curved shape	
Hesslerella	Isopoda	Phreatoicidea	H. shermani	A basal isopod, and a relatively rare faunal component of Mazon creek, at the time of its description, it was the oldest known isopod	
Eucryptocaris	Tanaidacea	Anthracocarididae	E. asherorum	A member of the Tanaidacea, originally described as a species of Cryptocaris by Schram, 1974	
Dithyrocaris	Phyllocarida	Archaeostraca	D. sp.	A wide ranging and diverse taxon of phyllocarid, the image on the right does not show the species from Mazon Creek, instead showing a species from the slightly older Breathitt Formation in Kentucky	
Kellibrooksia	Phyllocarida	Sairocarididae	K. macrogaster	A phyllocarid belonging to the Hoplostraca order, and possesses an elongated trunk and telson	
Leaia	Spinicaudata	Leaiidae	L. tricarinata	A clam shrimp within the Conchostraca, and represents the only group of branchiopods present at Mazon Creek	
Pemphilimnadiopsis	Spinicaudata	Pemphilimnadiopsidae	P. ortoni	Another clam shrimp, also known from China	
Illilepas	Cirripedia	Pedunculata	I. damrowi	A gooseneck barnacle, originally placed in the Praelepas genus before being redescribed as a separate taxon in 1986	
Americlus	Cyclida	Americlidae	A. americanus	A crab-like crustacean belonging to the Cyclida, originally described under the Cyclus genus, and a well known taxon from Mazon Creek	
Dziklus	Cyclida	Americlidae	D. obesus	Similarly to its contemporary relative, this cyclid was originally placed within the Cyclus genus before being redescribed in 2020	
Schramine	Cyclida	Schraminidae	S. max	This species was originally placed within the Halicyne genus until its redescription in 2020	
Apionicon	Cyclida	Schraminidae	A. apioides	The only known species was first discovered at Mazon Creek	
Geisina	Ostracoda	Geisinidae	G. robusta	A genus of freshwater ostracod known from throughout the Carboniferous	
Paraparchites	Ostracoda	Paraparchitidae	P. mazonensis	Another ostracod, members of this genus are known to have retained multiple shed molts, giving their carapaces a multi-layered look	

==== Hexapoda ====
Members of the hexapoda (insects and their relatives) constitute the most diverse group of animals known from Mazon Creek

Hexapoda
Genus	Clade	Higher taxon	Species	Notes	Images
Testajapyx	Incertae sedis	Testajapygidae	T. thomasi	A wingless non-insect hexapod of uncertain placement, unlike modern relatives, who has been classified as a dipluran, a true insect within Dermaptera, and as an enigmatic hexapod	
"Dasyleptus"	Archaeognatha	Dasyleptidae	D. sp.	A basal wingless insect, the specimens from Mazon Creek are putative, with some publications considering them to be chimeric in nature	
Ramsdelepidion	Zygentoma (?)	Incertae sedis	R. schusteri	A large (6 cm long) hexapod of uncertain placement, with some publications arguing for several different placements, including among the Zygentoma, stem-group Hexapoda, or as a large ephemeropteran nymph	
Archimylacris	Blattoptera	Archimylacridae	A. paucinervis	An early dictyopteran insect, and a "roachoid", despite its appearance, it wasn't closely related to true cockroaches	
Progonoblattina	Blattoptera	Gyroblattidae	P. sp. indet.	A roachoid, the holotype specimen (YPM IP 008412) was originally assigned to Megablattina, before being reassigned to Archoblattina, before finally being reassigned to Progonoblattina in 2023	
Mylacris	Blattoptera	Mylacridae	M. gurleyi	A roachoid described in 1895	
Lithoneura	Ephemeroptera (?)	Syntonopteridae	L. pieko; L. mirifica; L. clayesi; L. lameerei; L. carpenteri	A possible early mayfly, while some studies have questioned this placement, others support it	
Syntonoptera	Ephemeroptera (?)	Syntonopteridae	S. schucherti	Another early mayfly of the Syntonopteridae	
Oligotypus	Meganisoptera	Paralogidae	O. makowskii	A relatively small member of the Meganisoptera (griffinflies), and known from various sites across Carboniferous and Permian strata	
Dragonympha	Meganisoptera	Incertae sedis	D. srokai	A griffinfly known only from nymphal remains, of which, the adult form has not yet been confirmed amongst the already known meganisopteran taxa from the area	
Alanympha	Meganisoptera	Incertae sedis	A. richardsoni	Only known from a forewing and plates belonging to a nymphal individual	
Paralogopsis	Meganisoptera	Incertae sedis	P. longipes	Another griffinfly of uncertain placement within its order	
Carbonympha	'Eomeganisoptera'	Incertae sedis	C. herdinai		
Parapaolia	Pterygota	Incertae sedis	P. superba		
Sypharoptera	Diaphanopterodea (?)	Sypharopteridae	S. pneuma	A large insect of uncertain placement, but it may belong to the Diaphanopterodea	
Prochoroptera	Diaphanopterodea	Prochoropteridae	P. calopteryx	A member of the Diaphanopterodea, a group that would go on to survive until the end of the Permian	
Eubleptus	Palaeodictyoptera	Eubleptidae	E. danielsi; E. maculosus	A member of the Palaeodictyoptera, a group of large flying mainly herbivorous insects	
Lycodemas	Palaeodictyoptera	Lycocercidae	L. adolescens	Known from nymphal remains, including older instars	
Notorachis	Palaeodictyoptera	Lycocercidae	N. wolfforum		
Mcluckiepteron	Palaeodictyoptera	Spilapteridae	M. luciae	Named after the McLuckie family, who were prominent Mazon Creek collectors and early ESCONI members	
Homaloneura	Palaeodictyoptera	Spilapteridae	H. dabasinskasi	The species on the right is H. ligeia	
Bizarrea	Palaeodictyoptera	Spilapteridae	B. obscura	A palaeodictyopteran known from larval remains	
Spilaptera	Palaeodictyoptera	Spilapteridae	S. americana		
Mazothairos	Palaeodictyoptera	Homoiopteridae	M. enormis	A potentially giant palaeodictyopteran, and possibly one of the largest flying insects to have ever lived, however it is known from very fragmentary remains, so size estimates are tentative at best	
Mazonopterum	Palaeodictyoptera	Homoiopteridae	M. wolfforum		
Amousus	Palaeodictyoptera	Homoiopteridae	A. mazonus		
Thesoneura	Palaeodictyoptera	Homoiopteridae	T. americana	The image to the right is a replica model	
Scepasma	Palaeodictyoptera	Homoiopteridae	S. gigas		
Ametretus	Palaeodictyoptera	Homoiopteridae	A. loevis		
Larryia	Palaeodictyoptera	Homoiopteridae	L. osterbergi		
Mammia	Palaeodictyoptera	Homoiopteridae	M. alutacea		
Hypermegethes	Palaeodictyoptera	Hypermegethidae	H. schucherti	Other species are known from deposits in Kansas	
Turnbullia	Palaeodictyoptera	Incertae sedis	T. priscillae		
Diexodus	Palaeodictyoptera	Incertae sedis	D. debilius		
Palaiotaptus	Palaeodictyoptera	Incertae sedis	P. mazonus		
Eubrodia	Megasecoptera	Brodiidae	E. dabasinskasi	A close relative of the palaeodictyopterans, with a similar ecological role as well	
Lameereites	Megasecoptera	Brodiidae	L. curvipennis	A megasecopteran known from immature remains	
Mischoptera	Megasecoptera	Mischopteridae	M. douglassi	In the image on the right, B and C depict the species from Mazon creek, specifically the nymphal remains that have been found	
Adiphlebia	Paoliida	Anthracoptilidae	A. lacoana	A bizarre insect originally considered to have been one of the earliest beetles, however more recent analyses suggest a placement as a sister taxa to the Dictyoptera	
Eucaenus	Hypoperlida	Eucaenidae	E. ovalis	A member of the Hypoperlida, a group of insects commonly thought to be a stem-group of the Paraneoptera	
Aenigmatodes	Polyneoptera	Hapalopteridae	A. danielsi		
Protodictyon	Archaeorthoptera	Cacurgidae	P. pulchripenne		
Spilomastax	Archaeorthoptera	Cacurgidae	S. oligoneurus		
Cacurgus	Archaeorthoptera	Cacurgidae	C. spilopterus		
Anthrakoris	Archaeorthoptera	Omaliaidae	A. aetherius	The family was recently renamed in order to remove confusion with the similar sounding beetle subfamily Omaliinae	
Narkema	Archaeorthoptera	Cnemidolestidae	N. toeniatum		
Dieconeura	Archaeorthoptera	Spanioderidae	D. arcuata; D. mazona		
Miamia	Archaeorthoptera	Spanioderidae	M. bronsoni		
Lobeatta	Archaeorthoptera	Eoblattidae	L. schneideri		
Anegertus	Archaeorthoptera	Eoblattidae	A. cubitalis		
Nectoptilus	Archaeorthoptera	Eoblattidae	N. mazonus		
Gerarus	Archaeorthoptera	Geraridae	G. constrictus; G. mazonus; G. danae; G. vetus; G. collaris	A very common taxon from the Carboniferous, and known for its elongated and inflated thorax	
Genentomum	Archaeorthoptera	Geraridae	G. validum		
Anepitedius	Archaeorthoptera	Geraridae	A. giraffe		
Progenentomum	Archaeorthoptera	Geraridae	P. carbonis		
Gerapompus	Archaeorthoptera	Gerapompidae	G. extensus; G. blattinoides		
Rasstriga	Grylloblattodea	Idelinellidae	R. americana		
Epideigma	Grylloblattodea	Epideigmatidae	E. elegans	A member of the Grylloblattodea, and a distant relative of modern ice crawlers	
Apithanus	Protorthoptera	Apithanidae	A. jocularis		
Anthracothremma	Protorthoptera	Anthracothremmidae	A. robusta		
Melinophlebia	Protorthoptera	Anthracothremmidae	M. analis		
Pericalyphe	Protorthoptera	Anthracothremmidae	P. longa		
Silphion	Protorthoptera	Anthracothremmidae	S. latipenne		
Adeloneura	Protorthoptera	Adeloneuridae	A. thompsoni		
Hadentomum	Protorthoptera	Hadentomidae	H. americanum		
Heterologus	Protorthoptera	Hadentomidae	H. langfordorum	One of the largest protorthopterans from Mazon Creek, and described in 1944	
Herdina	Protorthoptera	Herdinidae	H. mirificus		
Cheliphlebia	Protorthoptera	Cheliphlebidae	C. elongata; C. carbonaria		
Metacheliphlebia	Protorthoptera	Incertae sedis	M. elongata		
Geraroides	Protorthoptera	Incertae sedis	G. maximus		
Schuchertiella	Protorthoptera	Incertae sedis	S. gracilis		

=== Cyclostomi ===
Members of Cyclostomi (hagfish and lampreys) are known from Mazon Creek.

Cyclostomi
Genus	Clade	Higher taxon	Species	Notes	Images
Mayomyzon	Petromyzontida	Mayomyzontidae	M. pieckoensis	One of the first discovered fossil lampreys, it differs from modern taxa by having fewer gill openings, more teeth, and larger eyes	
Pipiscius	Petromyzontida	Petromyzontiformes	P. zangerli	Another lamprey, often nicknamed "Push me-Pull you" in reference to each end being very similar in shape, may represent a synonym of Mayomyzon	
Gilpichthys	Myxini	Myxiniformes	G. greenei	A basal hagfish, was considered enigmatic until a placement within the myxini was accepted	
Myxinikela	Myxini	Myxiniformes	M. siroka	One of the oldest known hagfish, which shares several features with modern taxa (including large velar cavity and a cardinal heart)	

=== Chondrichthyes ===
A number of chondrichthyes (cartilaginous fish) are known from Mazon Creek, including a number of elasmobranchs and holocephalans.

Chondrichthyes
Genus	Clade	Higher taxon	Species	Notes	Images
Bandringa	Chondrichthyes	Elasmobranchii (placement uncertain)	B. rayi	A bizarre elasmobranch that possessed a hyper-elongated upper jaw. Juvenile specimens are known from Mazon Creek, and adults are known from parts of Pennsylvania and Ohio, suggesting the area of Mazon Creek was a mating ground for these fish	
Dabasacanthus	Chondrichthyes	Elasmobranchii	D. inskasi	A close relative of modern sharks, and a member of the Lonchidiidae family within the hybodontiformes order	
Holmacanthus	Chondrichthyes	Elasmobranchii	H. keithi	Tiny hybodontiform	
Orthacanthus	Chondrichthyes	Xenacanthida	O. sp.	A large xenacanthid fish, the species from Mazon Creek is unnamed	
Jimpohlia	Chondrichthyes	Holocephali	J. erinacea	A bizarre, tadpole-like holocephalian	
Polysentor	Chondrichthyes	Holocephali	P. gorbairdi	A chimaera-like holocephalian fish, and is one of the various holocephalians known from Mazon Creek	
Similhariotta	Chondrichthyes	Holocephali	S. dabasinskai	A small sized chimaeriform fish that possessed an elongated upper jaw, however a paper published by Grogan & Lund, 2008 suggests it may represent a specimen of the already known Bandringa	

=== Acanthodii ===
Some members of the acanthodii are known from Mazon Creek.

Acanthodians
Genus	Clade	Higher taxon	Species	Notes	Images
Acanthodes	Acanthodii	Acanthodiformes	A. beecheri; A. marshi; A. sp.	While genus Acanthodes is widespread, from Mazon Creek juvenile specimens that were named as "Acanthodes beecheri" are known, although this species is dubious.	
Trichorhipis	Acanthodii	Incertae sedis	T. praecursor	An acanthodian only known from a pectoral fin impression, once classified as a gyracanthid, now considered an enigmatic taxon.	

=== Actinopterygii ===
A large number of early actinopterygians are known from Mazon Creek, notably the Palaeonisciformes.

Actinopterygii
Genus	Clade	Higher taxon	Species	Notes	Images
"Elonichthys"	Actinopterygii	Elonichthyiformes	E. peltigerus; E. hypsilepus; E. disjunctus; E. wolffi; E. remotus	"E. peltigerus" and various other species known, none actually belong to the genus Elonichthys, but they haven't been reassigned yet.	
Illiniichthys	Actinopterygii	Palaeonisciformes	I. cozarti	Mainly differentiated by scale morphology	
Nozamichthys	Actinopterygii	Palaeonisciformes	N. contorta	Relatively similar to Illiniichthys	
Haplolepis	Actinopterygii	Palaeonisciformes			
Microhaplolepis	Actinopterygii	Palaeonisciformes	M. sp.		
Parahaplolepis	Actinopterygii	Palaeonisciformes	P. sp.		
Palaeoniscoid. sp.	Actinopterygii	Palaeonisciformes		Various undescribed palaeoniscoids	
Amphicentrum	Actinopterygii	Eurynotiformes	A. orbiculare	a member of the basal Eurynotiformes order of ray finned fish	
Pyritocephalus	Actinopterygii	Haplolepiformes	P. comptus; P. gracilis	One of the youngest known members of the Haplolepiformes order	
Platysomus	Actinopterygii	Platysomiformes	P. circularis	A long lasting genus, some species most likley belong to other genera	

=== Non-tetrapod sarcopterygii ===
Several groups of non-tetrapod sarcopterygians, including basal coelacanths and lungfish are known from the site.

Sarcopterygii
Genus	Clade	Higher taxon	Species	Notes	Images
Megalichthys	Sarcopterygii	Megalichthyiformes	M. cf. hibberti	Also known from the Catskill Formation	
Rhizodopsis	Sarcopterygii	Megalichthyiformes	R. cf. robustus; ?R. mazonius		
Esconichthys	Sarcopterygii	Megalichthyiformes	E. apopyris	A once enigmatic jawed vertebrate, often nicknamed 'blade', most often identified by its prominent eyes. Although once associated as a larval lungfish, recent studies on the cranium and tail have identified the taxon as a larval megalichthyid	
Rhabdoderma	Sarcopterygii	Coelacanthiformes	R. exiguum; R. robustus; R. elegans	A widespread and long lasting early coelacanth	
Conchopoma	Sarcopterygii	Dipnoi	C. edesi; C. arctatum	Also known from Permian aged deposits	
Ctenodus	Sarcopterygii	Dipnoi	C. cristatus	a widespread Carboniferous lungfish	
Megapleuron	Sarcopterygii	Dipnoi	M. zangerli	Also known from Permian aged deposits from France	
Palaeophichthys	Sarcopterygii	Dipnoi	P. parvulus	Another basal lungfish	

=== Tetrapods ===
Many exceptionally well-preserved tetrapods are known from Mazon Creek, mostly temnospondyls and assorted "microsaurs"

Tetrapoda
Genus	Clade	Higher taxon	Species	Notes	Images
Cephalerpeton	Reptiliomorpha	'Protorothyrididae'	C. ventriarmatum	A protorothyridid reptiliomorph	Skull restoration and diagram of the holotype specimen, YPM 796
Isodectes	Dvinosauria	Eobrachyopidae	I. obtusus	A dvinosaurian temnospondyl, and a senior synonym of Saurerpeton	
Amphibamus	Dissorophoidea	Amphibamidae	A. grandiceps	A modest sized temnospondyl, whose superfamily is commonly regarded as ancestral to crown-group amphibians	
Jeanerpeton	Dissorophoidea	Amphibamiformes	J. mazonensis	A small amphibamiform, the holotype of which preserves some of the earliest evidence of toe pads within temnospondyls	
Branchiosaurus	Temnospondyli	Branchiosauridae	B. sp.	Fossil specimens from Mazon Creek have been questionably referred to this taxon	
Spondylerpeton	Embolomeri	Archeriidae	S. spinatum	A member of the embolomeri, and one of the largest animals from Mazon Creek, reaching a little over a meter long	
Ctenerpeton	Nectridea	Urocordylidae	C. remex	Known from Mazon Creek via a group of caudal vertebrae described in 2025	
Ptyonius	Nectridea	Urocordylidae	P. marshii	Another member of the Urocordylidae	
Diabloroter	Recumbirostra	Brachystelechidae	D. bolti	Likely algivorous alongside other derived brachystelechids	
Brachydectes	Recumbirostra	Molgophidae	B. newberryi	Like with other lysorophians, this animal possessed a long snake-like body and a relatively small skull	
Infernovenator	Recumbirostra	Molgophidae	I. steeni	Has a somewhat less derived skull than other lysorophians	
Nagini	Recumbirostra	Molgophidae	N. mazonense	First lysorophian with hindlimbs but not forelimbs, suggesting a limb loss pattern similar to snakes	
Joermungandr	Recumbirostra	Odonterpetidae	J. bolti	Known from a complete specimen with large amounts of scale impressions	Diagrammatic reconstruction of J. bolti
Phlegethontia	Aistopoda	Phlegethontiidae	P. longissima	A snake-like tetrapod belonging to the Aistopoda	
Pseudophlegethontia	Aistopoda	Pseudophlegethontiidae	P. turnbullorum	Intermediate between the two main aistopod clades	Fossil of P. turnbullorum
Oestocephalus	Aistopoda	Oestocephalidae	O. amphiuminus	The type species is known from Mazon Creek, but other specimens are known from the Czech Republic and Ohio	

=== Miscellaneous taxa ===
This section documents faunal taxa whose taxonomic affinities are not fully understood, or do not fit into any of the above groups.

Miscellaneous taxa
Genus	Clade	Higher taxon	Species	Notes	Images
Tullimonstrum	Incertae sedis	Incertae sedis	T. gregarium	Perhaps the most well known, and infamous species from the site, recent research suggests a placement as either a non-vertebrate chordate, or a protostome of uncertain placement.	
Lascoa	Incertae sedis	Incertae sedis	L. mesostaurata	Originally considered as a true jellyfish within the Semaeostomeae, possessing frilly arms, but affinity is questioned.	
Escumasia	Incertae sedis	Incertae sedis	E. roryi	Often nickanmed the 'Y-animal', this problematic organism has been compared to cnidarians, but no concrete placement has been given.	
Etacystis	Hemichordata?	Pterobranchia?	E. communis	Also known as the 'H-animal', this colonial invertebrate is normally compared to hemichordates, but also hydrozoans	Fossil specimen of Etacystis communis
Archisymplectes	Nemertea	Palaeonemertea	A. rhothon	A featureless worm belonging to the Nemertea (ribbon worms).	
Priapulites	Priapulida	Priapulimorphida	P. konecniorum	One of the earliest known crown-group priapulid worms, and a close relative of the Priapulidae	
Mazoglossus	Enteropneusta	Spengelidae	M. ramsdelli	One of the oldest known definitive acorn worms in the fossil record, and a member of the extant family Spengelidae	
Paucijaculum	Chaetognatha	Incertae sedis	P. samamithion	A member of the Chaetognatha (arrow worms), and shares much in common with modern taxa	
Microconchida. sp	Lophophorata	Tentaculita	Various species	Originally considered a member of the Sabellida, but was later discovered all pre-Bathonian sabellids were instead microconchids	

=== Ichnotaxa ===
This section covers various ichnotaxa, or trace fossils, traces in the fossil record left behind by living organisms.

Ichnotaxa
Genus	Clade	Higher taxon	Species	Notes	Images
Fayolia	Xenacanthiformes	Xenacanthidae	F. sp.	A wide ranging ichnotaxon of chondrichthyan egg capsules, most likely produced by xenacanthids	
Palaeoxyris	Hybodontiformes	Incertae sedis	P. appendiculatum; P. lewisi; P. prendelli	Another wide ranging ichnotaxon of egg capsules, except these fossils were produced by various hybodonts	
Vetacapsula	Holocephali	Incertae sedis	V. cooperi	Another ichnotaxon of chondrichthyan egg capsules and was previously unknown from North America until specimens were uncovered from the Field Museum in the 1980s, and tentatively assigned to the Holocephali	
Mazonova	Chordata	Incertae sedis	M. helmichnus	Another ichnotaxon of eggs, that are typically incased in a gelatinous sheath, however the taxonomy of these fossils is quite problematic, with suggestions of the egg layers being various fish and tetrapods	
Diplocraterion	Annelida	Various groups	D. sp.	A wide ranging ichnotaxon of u-shaped burrows that are commonly found throughout the fossil record, and are presumably made by various polychaete worms (at least the marine examples)	
Rusophycus	Arthropoda	Various groups	R. sp.	A wide ranging ichnotaxon usually identified as the resting trace of an arthropod, most often associated with trilobites, but is also produced by other groups	
