= Senator Baker =

Senator Baker may refer to:

== Members of the United States Senate ==
- David J. Baker (1792–1869), U.S. Senator from Illinois in 1830
- Edward D. Baker (1811–1861), U.S. Senator from Oregon from 1860 to 1861
- Howard Baker (1925–2014), U.S. Senator from Tennessee from 1967 to 1985
- Lucien Baker (1846–1907), U.S. Senator from Kansas from 1895 to 1901

== United States state senate members ==
=== Arkansas State Senate ===
- Gilbert Baker (politician) (born 1956)

=== Florida State Senate ===
- Carey Baker (born 1963)
- J. Edwin Baker (1899–1963)

=== Hawaii State Senate ===
- Rosalyn Baker (born 1946)

=== Illinois State Senate ===
- B. Frank Baker (1864–1939)
- Charles W. Baker (1876–1963)

=== Indiana State Senate ===
- John Baker (1832–1915)

=== Kentucky State Senate ===
- Walter Arnold Baker (1937–2010)

=== Maine State Senate ===
- Linda Baker (born 1948)

=== Maryland State Senate ===
- Walter M. Baker (1927–2012)
- William Benjamin Baker (1840–1911)

=== Massachusetts State Senate ===
- Charles H. Baker (1847–1919)
- Daniel C. Baker (1816–1863)

=== Michigan State Senate ===
- Herbert F. Baker (1862–1930)

=== Nebraska State Senate ===
- Roy Baker (politician) (born 1945)
- Tom Baker (Nebraska politician) (born 1948)

=== New Hampshire State Senate ===
- Henry Moore Baker (1841–1912)

=== New Jersey State Senate ===
- Horace Baker (1869–1941)

=== New York State Senate ===
- Isaac V. Baker Jr. (1843–1912)

=== North Carolina State Senate ===
- Simmons Jones Baker (1775–1853)

=== Pennsylvania State Senate ===
- Earl M. Baker (born 1940)
- Jesse Matlack Baker (1854–1913)
- Lisa Baker (Pennsylvania politician)

=== Tennessee State Senate ===
- LaMar Baker (1915–2003)

=== Texas State Senate ===
- William R. Baker (1820–1890)

=== Washington State Senate ===
- George H. Baker (1859–1928)
- John S. Baker (1861–1955)

=== West Virginia State Senate ===
- Lewis Baker (politician) (1832–1899)

=== Wisconsin State Senate ===
- Robert Hall Baker (1839–1882)

== Other ==
- James McNair Baker (1821-1892), Confederate States Senator from Florida from 1862 to 1865
