= Edmondia =

Edmondia may refer to:

- Edmondia (plant), a plant genus in the family Asteraceae
- Edmondia (bivalve), an extinct bivalve genus in the family Edmondiidae and the order Anomalodesmata
