= Kewanee, Illinois =

City in Illinois, United States

City of Kewanee, Illinois
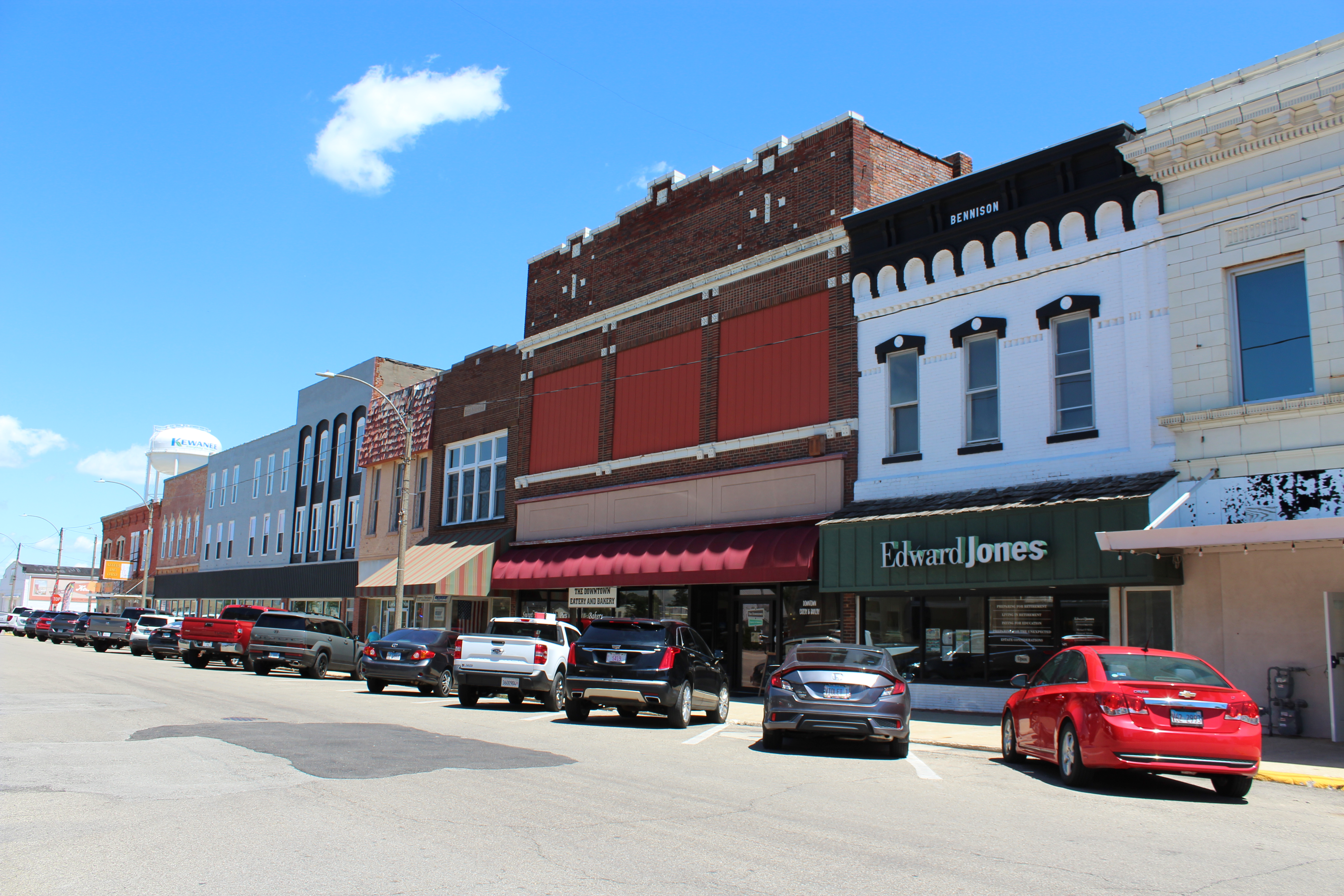
- Corner of North Tremont Street and W Second St
- Nickname: Hog Capital of the World
- Location of Kewanee in Henry County, Illinois.
- Coordinates: 41°14′N 89°56′W
- Country: United States
- State: Illinois
- County: Henry
- Incorporated: 1854

Government
  - Mayor: Gary Moore

Area
  - Total: 6.61 sq mi (17.12 km^{2})
  - Land: 6.60 sq mi (17.09 km^{2})
  - Water: 0.012 sq mi (0.03 km^{2})
- Elevation: 803 ft (245 m)

Population (2020)
  - Total: 12,509
  - Estimate (July 2025): 12,115
  - Density: 1,896/sq mi (732.1/km^{2})
- Time zone: UTC-6 (CST)
  - Summer (DST): UTC-5 (CDT)
- ZIP code: 61443
- Area code: 309
- FIPS code: 17-39727
- GNIS feature ID: 2395523
- Website: cityofkewanee.com

Kewanee (/kiːˈwɑːniː/) is a city in Henry County, Illinois. "Kewanee" is the Winnebago word for greater prairie-chicken, which lived there. The population was 12,509 in the 2020 census, down from 12,916 in 2010.

== Geography ==
According to the 2021 census gazetteer files, Kewanee has a total area of 6.61 square miles (17.12 km^{2}), of which 6.60 square miles (17.09 km^{2}) (or 99.82%) is land and 0.01 square miles (0.03 km^{2}) (or 0.18%) is water.

The Kewanee Group is named after Kewanee.

=== Climate ===
Climate data for Kewanee, Illinois (1991–2020 normals, extremes 1939–present)
Month	Jan	Feb	Mar	Apr	May	Jun	Jul	Aug	Sep	Oct	Nov	Dec	Year
Record high °F (°C)	67 (19)	71 (22)	85 (29)	91 (33)	96 (36)	101 (38)	105 (41)	103 (39)	102 (39)	91 (33)	79 (26)	69 (21)	105 (41)
Mean daily maximum °F (°C)	30.3 (−0.9)	34.8 (1.6)	47.7 (8.7)	60.9 (16.1)	72.0 (22.2)	80.9 (27.2)	83.7 (28.7)	82.2 (27.9)	76.5 (24.7)	63.8 (17.7)	48.5 (9.2)	35.8 (2.1)	59.8 (15.4)
Daily mean °F (°C)	22.1 (−5.5)	26.1 (−3.3)	37.5 (3.1)	49.3 (9.6)	61.1 (16.2)	70.5 (21.4)	73.6 (23.1)	71.4 (21.9)	64.2 (17.9)	52.4 (11.3)	39.1 (3.9)	27.8 (−2.3)	49.6 (9.8)
Mean daily minimum °F (°C)	13.8 (−10.1)	17.4 (−8.1)	27.4 (−2.6)	37.7 (3.2)	50.2 (10.1)	60.2 (15.7)	63.4 (17.4)	60.7 (15.9)	51.9 (11.1)	41.0 (5.0)	29.7 (−1.3)	19.7 (−6.8)	39.4 (4.1)
Record low °F (°C)	−27 (−33)	−25 (−32)	−11 (−24)	−2 (−19)	22 (−6)	38 (3)	42 (6)	38 (3)	25 (−4)	17 (−8)	−4 (−20)	−24 (−31)	−27 (−33)
Average precipitation inches (mm)	1.89 (48)	2.06 (52)	2.62 (67)	3.96 (101)	5.07 (129)	5.00 (127)	3.69 (94)	3.86 (98)	3.68 (93)	2.93 (74)	2.65 (67)	2.17 (55)	39.58 (1,005)
Average snowfall inches (cm)	8.7 (22)	8.5 (22)	3.2 (8.1)	1.2 (3.0)	0.1 (0.25)	0.0 (0.0)	0.0 (0.0)	0.0 (0.0)	0.2 (0.51)	0.3 (0.76)	1.4 (3.6)	7.5 (19)	31.1 (79)
Average precipitation days (≥ 0.01 in)	9.3	8.6	10.2	12.3	14.0	12.3	9.6	9.5	8.0	10.8	9.5	9.4	123.5
Average snowy days (≥ 0.1 in)	5.8	4.9	2.1	0.6	0.0	0.0	0.0	0.0	0.1	0.2	1.0	4.4	19.1
Source: NOAA

== Demographics ==
Historical population
Census	Pop.	Note	%±
1880	2,704		—
1890	4,569		69.0%
1900	8,382		83.5%
1910	9,307		11.0%
1920	16,026		72.2%
1930	17,093		6.7%
1940	16,901		−1.1%
1950	16,821		−0.5%
1960	16,324		−3.0%
1970	15,762		−3.4%
1980	14,508		−8.0%
1990	12,969		−10.6%
2000	12,944		−0.2%
2010	12,916		−0.2%
2020	12,509		−3.2%
U.S. Decennial Census

=== 2020 census ===
As of the 2020 census, Kewanee had a population of 12,509, with 5,088 households and 3,233 families residing in the city. The population density was 1,892.72 inhabitants per square mile (730.78/km^{2}).

The median age was 39.6 years. 24.5% of residents were under the age of 18 and 18.6% were 65 years of age or older. For every 100 females, there were 97.5 males, and for every 100 females age 18 and over, there were 96.9 males age 18 and over.

99.0% of residents lived in urban areas, while 1.0% lived in rural areas.

Of all households, 29.2% had children under the age of 18 living in them. 38.7% were married-couple households, 21.3% were households with a male householder and no spouse or partner present, and 30.9% were households with a female householder and no spouse or partner present. About 34.8% of all households were made up of individuals, and 16.4% had someone living alone who was 65 years of age or older. The average household size was 2.41 and the average family size was 3.02.

Of the 5,754 housing units, 11.6% were vacant. The homeowner vacancy rate was 3.3% and the rental vacancy rate was 12.4%. The housing unit density was 870.63 per square mile (336.15/km^{2}).

Racial composition as of the 2020 census
Race	Number	Percent
White	9,665	77.3%
Black or African American	873	7.0%
American Indian and Alaska Native	41	0.3%
Asian	50	0.4%
Native Hawaiian and Other Pacific Islander	6	0.0%
Some other race	932	7.5%
Two or more races	942	7.5%
Hispanic or Latino (of any race)	1,810	14.5%

=== Income and poverty ===
The median income for a household in the city was $40,196, and the median income for a family was $46,680. Males had a median income of $37,136 versus $26,297 for females. The per capita income for the city was $21,170. About 15.5% of families and 23.1% of the population were below the poverty line, including 40.1% of those under age 18 and 14.3% of those age 65 or over.

== Industry ==
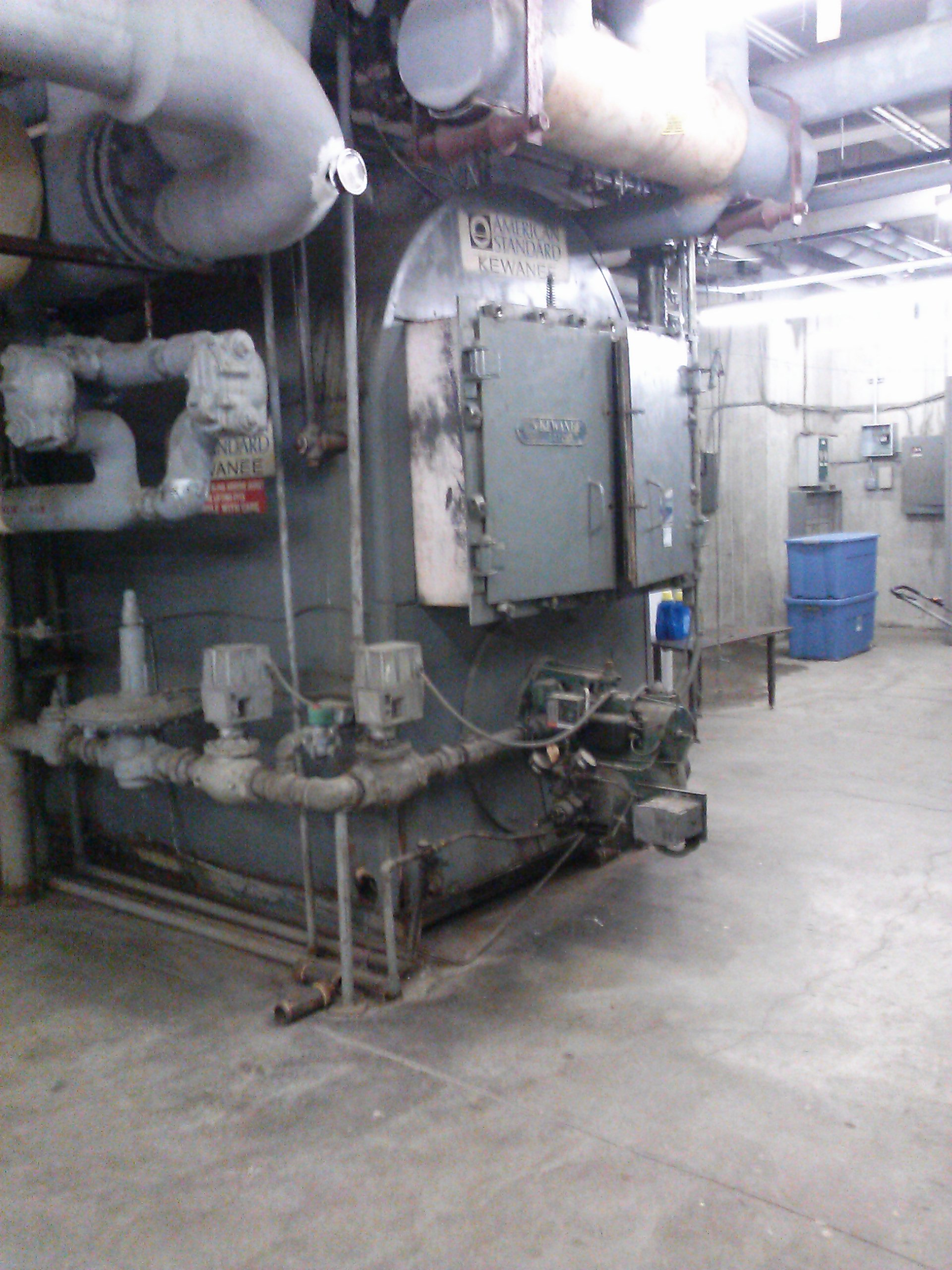
Kewanee Boiler

Kewanee was once known for its fire-tube boiler industry. The Kewanee Boiler Corporation manufactured and sold boilers throughout the world for over one hundred years. The company shuttered in 2002, however, boilers manufactured in Kewanee are still in common use. The Kewanee High School athletic teams are nicknamed the "Boilermakers". In 2023, the boiler shop burned down and now has a sign that says "Kewanee Boiler Workers Memorial, dedicated to over 130 years of boiler-making."

Boss Manufacturing Company was founded in Kewanee in 1893, and is oldest work glove company in the United States. As of 2018, the company had 125 employees in Kewanee.

Kewanee was home to minor league baseball. The Kewanee Boilermakers minor league baseball team played in the Central Association from 1908 to 1913. In 1948–1949, the Kewanee A's rejoined the Central Association. Kewanee was an affiliate of the Philadelphia Athletics (1948–1949). Kewanee minor league teams played at Terminal Park (1908–1913) and Northeast Park (1948–1949).

== Parks ==
Kewanee has many different types of parks in the immediate area, offering a variety of activities such as boating, camping, hunting, fishing, playgrounds, baseball fields, and more. Parks inside the city limits are run by the Kewanee Park District.

Maintained by the city, West Park, Veterans Park, and McKinley Park are smaller parks that everyone in the family can enjoy. While Francis Park has a historic home, previously owed by Frederick Francis and dates back to 1890, that offers tours Tuesday through Sunday.

Johnson's Sauk Trail State Park has a 58 acre lake where boating and fishing can take place. There are also several areas where tent and RV camping is permitted.

== Education ==
The northern part is in the Kewanee Community Unit School District 229, and the southern part is in the Wethersfield Community Unit School District 230.

Kewanee has historically had two school districts, dating to when the community of Wethersfield was a separate municipality. Though the towns merged long ago, the two school districts both remain in the city of 13,400, divided at Division Street in the middle of Kewanee. While Kewanee School District #229 has around 2,015 students (533 High School), Wethersfield #230 has about 600 students. The two schools enjoy a usually friendly rivalry, since Kewanee High School and Wethersfield High School are in different divisions for most sports. However, this rivalry did become very heated in the sports the two high schools once competed in, most notably basketball.

Black Hawk College-East Campus is recognized nationally for its equestrian program, as well as livestock judging teams. (Another Campus is located in the Quad Cities.)

== Festivals ==
The most notable festival held in the community is Hog Days. It is held annually on Labor Day weekend. Events include a carnival, mud volleyball, a parade, and more.

== Local media ==
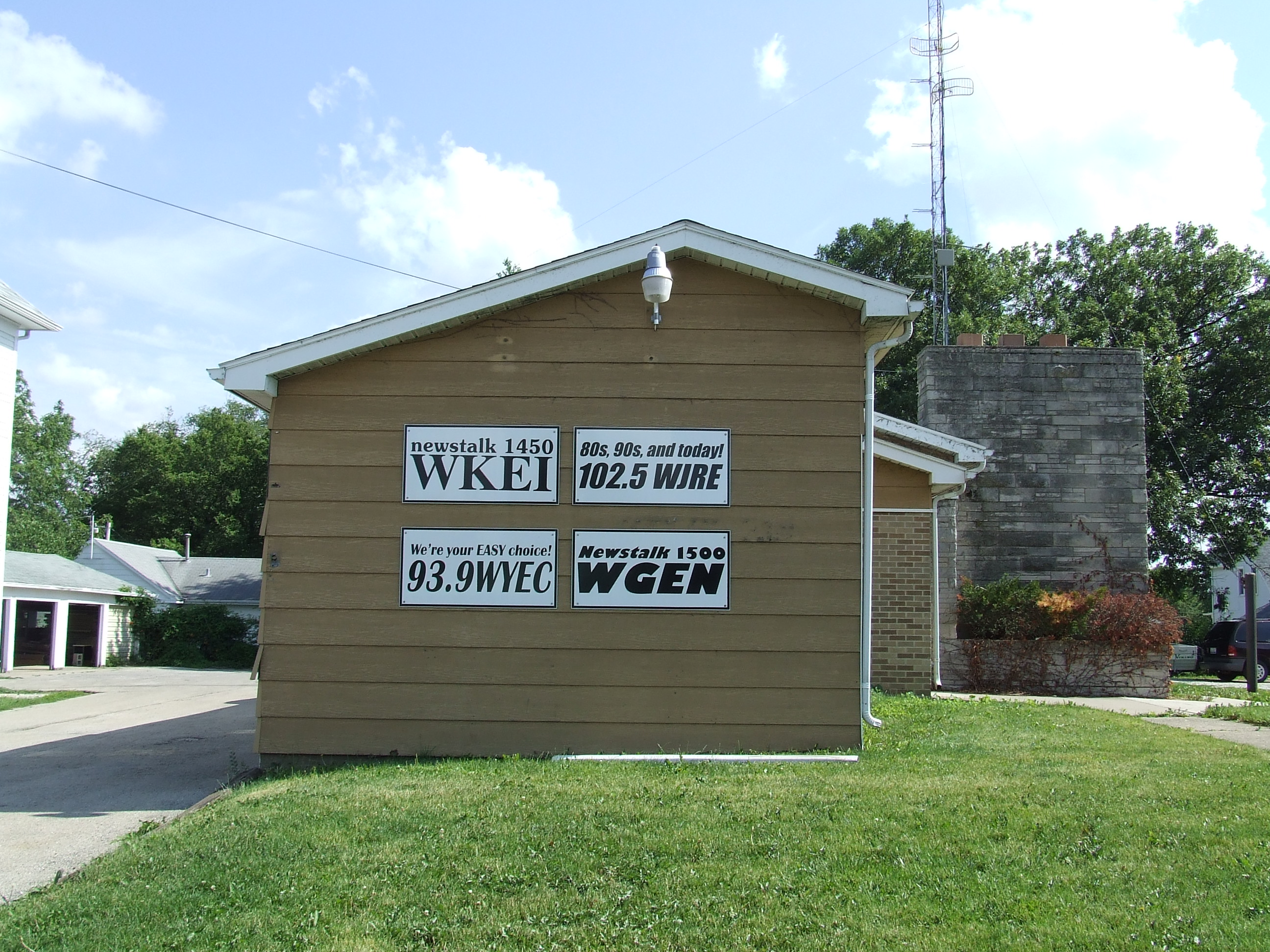
Kewanee radio stations

=== FM radio ===
- 93.9 KQCJ "Planet 93.9", alternative
- 102.1 W271BL (Jack FM), Jack FM
- 102.5 WJRE "HOG Country 102.5", country (RDS)
- 104.7 W284CV "Rock2.0", rock
- 100.1 W282AL (translates 1450 WKEI), news/talk

=== AM radio ===
- 1450 WKEI, news/talk

=== Newspapers ===
- Star Courier
- The Kewanee Voice

== Notable businesses ==
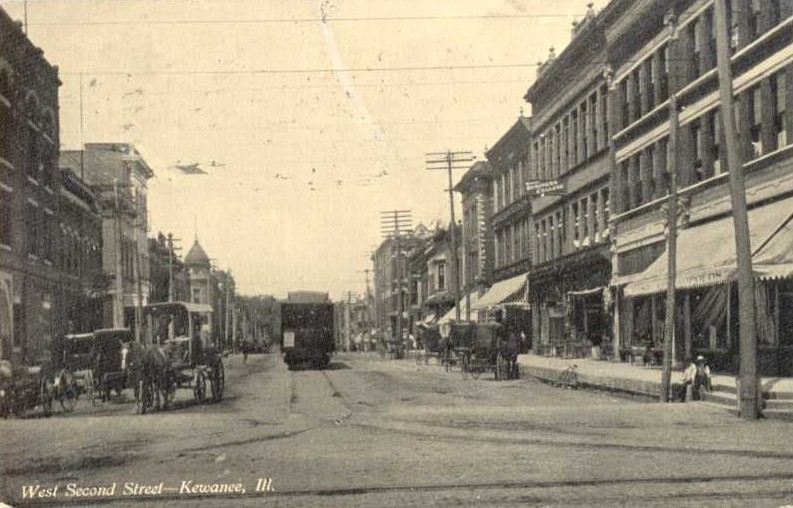
West Second Street, 1908

- Hotel Kewanee
- Sandy's Drive-In National Headquarters

== Notable people ==
- Walter T. Bailey (1882–1941), architect. Born and raised in Kewanee, Bailey was the first African-American graduate of the University of Illinois' School of Architecture.
- B. Frank Baker (1864–1939), member of the Illinois Senate, was a resident of Kewanee and served as its mayor.
- Neville Brand (1920–1992), actor and decorated World War II veteran
- Mike Cernovich (born 1977), media personality.
- W. K. Davidson (1904–1974), Illinois state representative, senator and restaurateur.
- Edward Robb Ellis (1911–1998), journalist and diarist
- Richard Estes (born 1932), artist
- Frederick Dilley Glidden (pen name Luke Short), Western writer, known for Ramrod (1947) and Blood on the Moon (1948)
- Bill Goffrier, guitarist for The Embarrassment
- Belden Hill (1864–1934), MLB third baseman for the Baltimore Orioles
- Em Lindbeck (1934–2008), MLB outfielder for the Detroit Tigers, mayor of Kewanee
- Glenn McDonald (born 1952), NBA small forward / shooting guard for the Boston Celtics and Milwaukee Bucks
- Amber McReynolds (born 1979), chief executive of the National Vote at Home Institute and member of the Board of Governors of the United States Postal Service, was raised in Kewanee.
- Albinus Nance (1848–1911), 4th governor of Nebraska, was raised in Kewanee
- Dennis Nelson, professional football player
- Sod Ryan (1905–1964), NFL tackle for the Chicago Bears
- Lindsay Stalzer (born 1984), professional volleyball player, was raised in Kewanee.
- Marjabelle Young Stewart (1924–2007), writer and expert on etiquette, moved to Kewanee in 1965 and resided there until her 2007 death.
- Teresa Sullivan (born 1949), President of the University of Virginia (2010–2018), was raised in Kewanee.
- Dale Whittaker, fifth President of the University of Central Florida

== Transportation ==
The Kewanee Amtrak station serves trains on the Carl Sandburg and Illinois Zephyr daily. The current station was completed April 13, 2012.
