= Frederick Francis Woodland Palace =

Historic house in Illinois, United States

- U.S. National Register of Historic Places
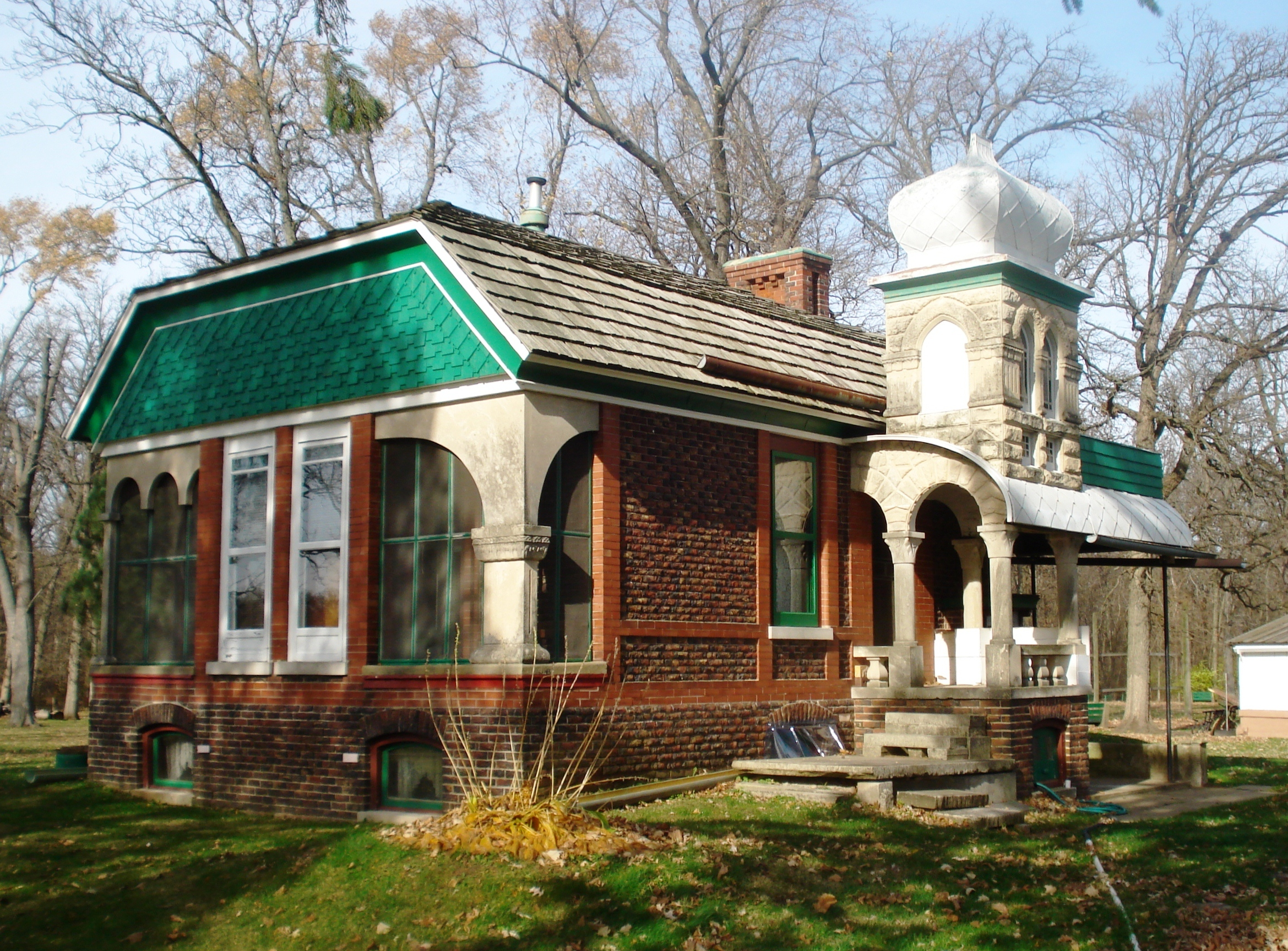

- Location within Illinois Location within the United States
- Nearest city: Kewanee, Illinois
- Coordinates: 41°16′44″N 89°51′35″W
- Area: 2 acres (0.81 ha)
- Built: 1889
- Architect: Frederick Francis
- Architectural style: Queen Anne, Romanesque
- Website: Francis Park
- NRHP reference No.: 75000662
- Added to NRHP: April 14, 1975

The Frederick Francis Woodland Palace is a historic house located in Francis Park 2.5 miles (4.0 km) northeast of Kewanee, Illinois. Frederick Francis, a multi-talented architect, engineer, and artist, began work on the house in 1889; while he and his wife moved into the house a year later, he continued to work on it until his death in 1926. The house has an eclectic design noted both for its vernacular interpretation of Queen Anne and Romanesque Revival architecture and its innovative engineering. The building's exterior design includes a hand-chipped brick exterior, a concrete tower above the main entrance, two porches on the south side, a solarium on the west side, and a gambrel roof. The interior's noteworthy features include a bedroom designed like a Pullman sleeping car, a system of levers which opened both front doors at once, a hearth with a flue system that also helped heat the house, a water filtration and heating system supplied by a cistern, and several secret compartments.

The house was added to the National Register of Historic Places on April 14, 1975.
