= Tesnus, Texas =

- Ghost town, unincorporated community
- Location within Texas
- Coordinates: 30°7′5″N 102°53′52″W
- Country: United States
- State: Texas
- County: Brewster
- Elevation: 3,720 ft (1,134 m)
- Time zone: UTC-6 (Central (CST))
  - Summer (DST): UTC-5 (CDT)
- ZIP codes: 79843
- Area code: 432
- GNIS feature ID: 1379153

Tesnus is a ghost town and unincorporated community in Brewster County, in the U.S. state of Texas.

== History ==
Tesnus was laid out in 1882 when the Southern Pacific Railroad was extended to that point. Tesnus (sunset spelled backwards) was so named for the fact a sunset appeared in the logo of the Southern Pacific Railroad. A post office was established at Tesnus in 1912, and remained in operation until 1954.

== Geology ==
Tesnus, Texas, is the namesake for the geological formation known either as the Tesnus Formation or Tesnus Shale. Bedrock outcrops around Tesnus, Texas serve as the type locality for the Tesnus Formation.

== See also ==
- List of geographic names derived from anagrams and ananyms
