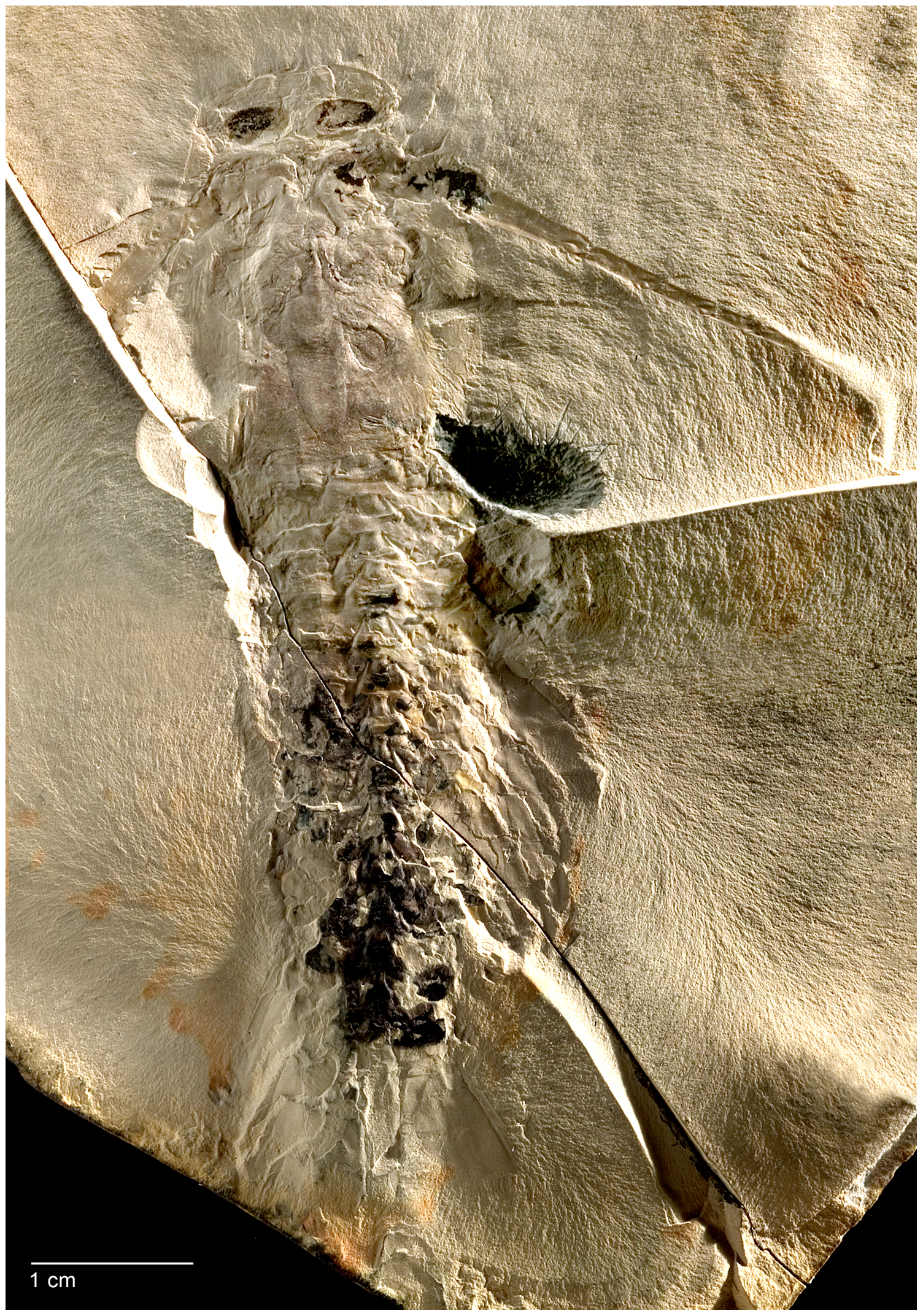
- Tesnusocaris goldichi

Scientific classification
- Kingdom: Animalia
- Phylum: Arthropoda
- Class: Remipedia
- Order: †Enantiopoda; Birshtein, 1960
- Family: †Tesnusocarididae; Brooks, 1955

Type genus
- †Tesnusocaris Brooks, 1955

Other genera
- †Cryptocaris Schram, 1974

Synonyms
- Cryptocarididae Sieg, 1980

= Tesnusocarididae =

Tesnusocarididae Temporal range: Lower Pennsylvanian–Middle Pennsylvanian

Extinct family of remipedes

Tesnusocarididae is an extinct family of remipedes and the sole member of the order Enantiopoda. It contains two genera, the type genus Tesnusocaris, and Cryptocaris, both known from the Carboniferous, with Tesnusocaris known from the Lower Pennsylvanian Tesnus Formation and Cryptocaris from the Middle Pennsylvanian Mazon Creek fossil beds.
