= B. Frank Baker =

American businessman and politician (1864–1929)

Benjamin Franklin Baker

Member of the Illinois Senate from the 27th district
- In office 1906–1910

Personal details
- Born: July 26, 1864 Aurora, Illinois
- Died: April 10, 1939 (aged 74)
- Spouse: Mary H. Chandler (m. 1901)

Benjamin Franklin Baker (July 26, 1864 – April 10, 1939) was an American businessman and politician.

== Biography ==
Baker was born in Aurora, Illinois on July 26, 1864, to Nelson G. Baker, a local jeweler who died in 1875, and Lucy L. Cross, who died in 1896. When he was 6 years old, Baker's family moved to Sheffield, Illinois. He graduated from a high school there and at the age of 19, became a bookkeeper for the First National Bank of Kewanee, Illinois. He was elected as village clerk of Kewanee in 1885, serving two terms in that position. In 1888, he resigned from the bank, opting to work for the Haxtun Steam Heater Company until 1892, when he became treasurer of the newly-incorporated Kewanee Boiler Corporation; he also became vice-president of the company following the death of Horton Vail in 1902.

On June 12, 1901, he married Mary H. Chandler. They had two children together. In November 1906, Baker, representing the 37th district, was elected to the Illinois Senate, where he served one term. Following that, he became the mayor of Kewanee, the first under a city commission government, serving from 1911 to 1919. Baker was also a member of the Henry County committee, a Freemason, and a member of two clubs.

On April 10, 1939, Baker died from complications resulting from an appendectomy. He had left an estate of $350,000 (1930 USD) and in his will, allocated $20,000 (1930 USD) to his wife, who was the chief beneficiary.
