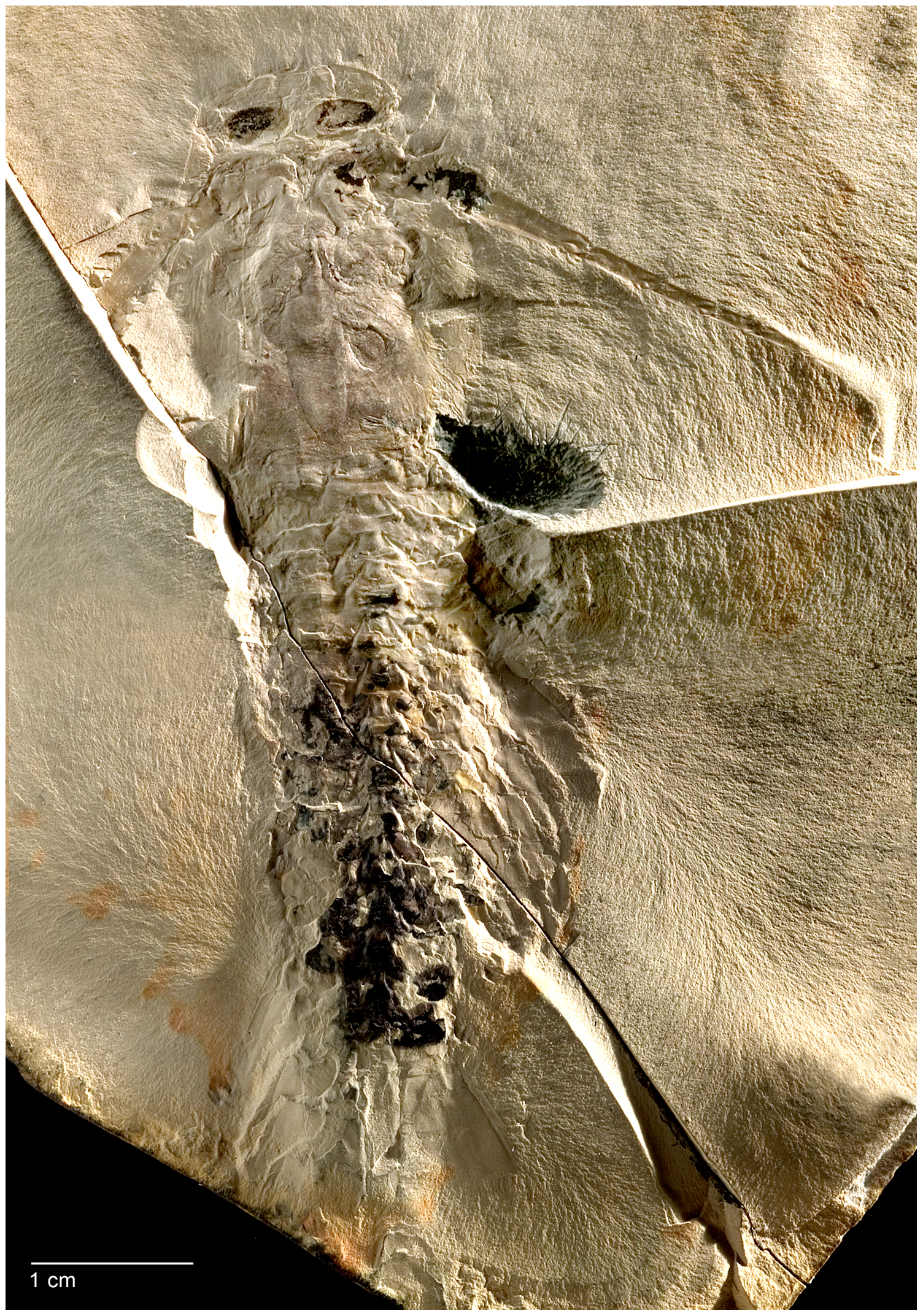
- Tesnusocaris goldichi

Scientific classification
- Kingdom: Animalia
- Phylum: Arthropoda
- Class: Remipedia
- Order: †Enantiopoda
- Family: †Tesnusocarididae
- Genus: †Tesnusocaris; Brooks, 1955
- Species: †T. goldichi

Binomial name
- †Tesnusocaris goldichi Brooks, 1955

= Tesnusocaris =

Tesnusocaris Temporal range: Lower Pennsylvanian

Extinct genus of crustaceans

Tesnusocaris is an extinct, monospecific genus of remipedian crustaceans that lived in the Pennsylvanian period, one of the two representatives of the extinct remipedian order Enantiopoda. It is known from a fossil discovered in the Lower Pennsylvanian (Paleozoic, Carboniferous) Tesnus Formation of Texas. The other known enantiopod remipedian is Cryptocaris hootchi of the Mazon Creek fauna.

The type and only species is Tesnusocaris goldichi.
