= Tesnus Formation =

Geologic formation in Texas

- Stratigraphic range: Carboniferous; 355–318 Ma
- Type: Formation
- Unit of: Quachita facies
- Underlies: Dimple Limestone
- Overlies: Caballos Novaculite
- Area: Marathon fold belt, west Texas
- Thickness: 2,000–300 m (6,560–980 ft)

Lithology
- Primary: sandstone and black shale
- Other: volcanic tuff and olistostrome

Location
- Region: Trans-Pecos, Texas
- Country: United States

Type section
- Named for: Tesnus, Texas
- Named by: Baker and Bowman (1971)

The Tesnus Formation is a geologic formation that is exposed within the Marathon Basin as part of the Marathon fold belt in the region of Marathon, Texas. It consists of interbedded, Carboniferous black shale and olive drab fine- to very fine-grained sandstone. It is a remarkably wedge-shaped geologic formation that thins in thickness from 2,000 m (6,600 ft) in the east to 100 m (330 ft) in the west over a distance of 39 km (24 mi). In the eastern, thickest, part of its outcrop, its base consists of shale several hundred feet thick. The interbedded shale and sandstone grades westward into shale that makes up the entire thickness of the Tesnus Formation in the west. A tuff and a basal olistostrome also occur within the Tesnus Formation. The sandstone beds were either deposited on a steep submarine slope by turbidity currents or emplaced as sedimentary dikes and sills. The Tesnus Formation is characterized by abundance of soft-sediment deformation structures indicative of widespread slumping contemporaneous with its deposition.

The Tesnus Formation is well exposed in roadcuts east of Marathon, Texas. In the roadcuts, it consists of near-vertical beds of interbedded sandstone and shale that are the upright to overturned limbs of large, regional-scale folds of the Marathon fold belt. The Tesnus Formation also outcrops in the area around Tesnus Station for which it is named.

The Marathon Basin is a physiographic depression created by the erosion of the crest of a Paleogene-age domal uplift that is called the Marathon Uplift. This basin is approximately 125 km (78 mi) in diameter. The depression is the result of the erosion of Cretaceous strata that originally covered the Marathon Uplift and relatively weaker, strongly deformed pre-Permian rocks underlying them. The Glass Mountains, which form the northern border of the Marathon basin consist of stronger Permian rocks, mainly limestone, from which the Cretaceous rocks have also been largely stripped by erosion. The edges of the Marathon Basin consist of prominent escarpments formed by horizontal Cretaceous strata resting on an angular unconformity with the underlying, deformed pre-Permian rocks of the Marathon Uplift.

== Nomenclature ==
The Tesnus Formation was first studied and named bv Baker and Bowman in 1917 for outcrops of it in the vicinity of Tesnus Station on the Southern Pacific Railroad. Baker and Bowman and King described the basic stratigraphy of the strata comprising Tesnus Formation. Where it is thickness, the basal shale of the Tesnus Formation was designated as the Rough Creek shale member by Baker and Bowman. However, this name is preoccupied by a geologic formation in the Pennsylvanian of Central Texas and was rejected by later geologists.

== Lithology ==
The Tesnus Formation is a thick northeast-southwest trending wedge of interbedded sandstone and shale that outcrops in the Marathon Basin as part of the Marathon fold belt. In the northwest part of the Marathon Basin, it consists of 100 m (330 ft) of predominately shale that thickens and grades into 2,000 m (6,600 ft) of fine to very fine grained, clayey, olive drab to light brown sandstone and black shale in the in the southeastern part of the Marathon Basin. The thickness of its sandstone beds ranges from a fraction of an inch to 3 to 5 m (9.8 to 16.4 ft) thick with most between 30 to 150 cm (12 to 59 in) thick. Most sandstones are typically olive-drab to light-brown, strongly compacted, and nonporous. They contain less than 10 percent clay matrix and less than 10 percent quartz cement. In the southeastern part of the Marathon Basin, the Tesnus Formation contains less shale than elsewhere and has thicker sandstones.

About 40% of the outcropping sandstone beds in the Tesnus Formation exhibit internal or external sedimentary structures characteristic of sandstones deposited by submarine landslides as turbidites. These sedimentary structures include graded bedding, horizontal lamination, convolute bedding, and small current-ripple lamination that form partial Bouma sequences. Commonly, the sandstone beds that are thicker than 3 m (9.8 ft) exhibit evidence of amalgamation, which is the stacking of separate sedimentation units. Sole marks are well developed locally. These sandstone beds have an even thickness across an outcrop, abrupt bases, and indistinct upper contacts with the overlying shale.

The other 60% of the outcropping sandstone beds are structureless. These sandstone beds typically lack grading and partial Bouma sequences. Commonly, they have unusually sharp contacts with adjacent shales along both upper and lower contacts and contain locally abundant detrital clay that is as much as 42% of the sandstone bed. Within individual outcrops, many of these sandstone layers abruptly change their thickness. In 1970, McBride observed a lack of direct evidence for the origin of the structureless beds. The orientation of these sandstone beds with respect to primary bedding indicates that they are clastic injection structures transitional between dikes and sills that were produced by fluidzation and sediment remobilization.

One prominent characteristic of the outcropping Tesnus Formation is an abundance of slump structures. In some outcrops, it is impossible to find 10 m (33 ft) of laterally continuous undisturbed (unslumped) bedding. Soft sediment deformation typical of slumping include warped, folded, disrupted, and broken sandstone beds, contorted shale beds, and localized olistostromes and boulder beds. Associated with these features are sandstone dikes and sills of uneven thickness. In the Tesnus Formation, soft sediment faults also transect sandstone soles and, locally, tops of beds. Their regularly orientation can be used to determine the paleoslope direction with was parallel with the paleocurrent direction. Finally, thick mudstone beds exhibit conchoidal fractures that formed as beds of sand and clay slide downslope and mixed to form structureless layers of mud. The abundance of soft-sediment deformational structures exhibited by the Tesnus Formation provide convincing evidence of widespread liquefaction and fluidization of sands and clays during and relatively soon after their accumulation.

Within the Payne Hills in the western part of the Marathon Basin, an olistostrome up to 13 m (43 ft) thick forms the base of the Tesnus Formation. It contains boulders up to 8 m (26 ft)in diameter. They are widely scattered across the ground surface that lacks exposure of olistostrome's matrix. About 50 percent of the boulders consist of exotic shelf Cambro-Ordovician limestones; 10 percent of indigenous rocks consistent with a basinal (Dagger Flat, Maravillas, Caballos, Tesnus) origin; and 40 percent of indigenous, shallow-water facies basinal rocks.

In roadcuts along U.S. Highway 90 near Marathon, Texas, a sequence of argillized vitric-crystal tuffs about 18 m (59 ft) thick is exposed. These tuffs occur within the Tesnus Formation about 1,200 m (3,900 ft) below its top. These tuffs occur as a stack of beds as much as 5 m (16 ft)thick. Within these beds, one graded, tuff turbidite and two tuffaceous, structureless debris flow deposits can be recognized. The tuffaceous mass flow deposits are structureless, exhibit chaotically oriented micas and plant fragments, and spheroidally weathered. They contain discontinuous nodules, lenses, and disrupted beds of greenish-gray to black siliceous shale in the upper part of each tuff bed. Hemipelagic, green, fissile clay-shale beds, up to 2 m (6.6 ft) thick, separate each tuff bed. The radiolarian assemblage recovered from these siliceous shale beds indicates that these tuff beds are Chesterian through early Morrowan age. This is basically the same age as the Hatton and Beavers Bend tuffs in the Carboniferous flysch in the Ouachita Mountains.

== Contacts ==
The contact between the base of the Tesnus Formation and top of the underlying Caballos Novaculite is a unconformity of regional significance. That this contact represents a break representing a period of regional erosion, nondeposition, or combination of both is indicated by variations in the thickness of the upper cherts of the Caballos Novaculite and the presence nearly everywhere of a thin chert conglomerates at the base of the Tesnus Formation. However, in places the contact between these formations can be difficult to map because uppermost cherts and siliceous shales of the Caballos Novaculite closely resemble the basal shales of the Tesnus Formation. In addition, this contact might represent a surface on which a gradual northwestward overlap of the Tesnus Formation occurs against the unconformable upper surface of the Caballos Novaculite.

Studies of radiolarian and conodont assemblages indicates that the contact between the Caballos Novaculite and Tesnus Formation is a hiatus representing most of the Early MIssissippian. Also, the contact between the Caballos Novaculite and Tesnus Formation signals a dramatic change in the deposition environments and processes between the slow, pelagic accumulation of radiolarian ooze in a starved basin and the rapid deposition of turbidites and the accumulation of flysch.

The upper contact of the Tesnus Formation with the overlying Dimple Limestone is likely comfortable. This contact is typically gradational as it consists of a transition zone of interbedded limestone and shale.

== Paleontology, paleobotany, and age ==
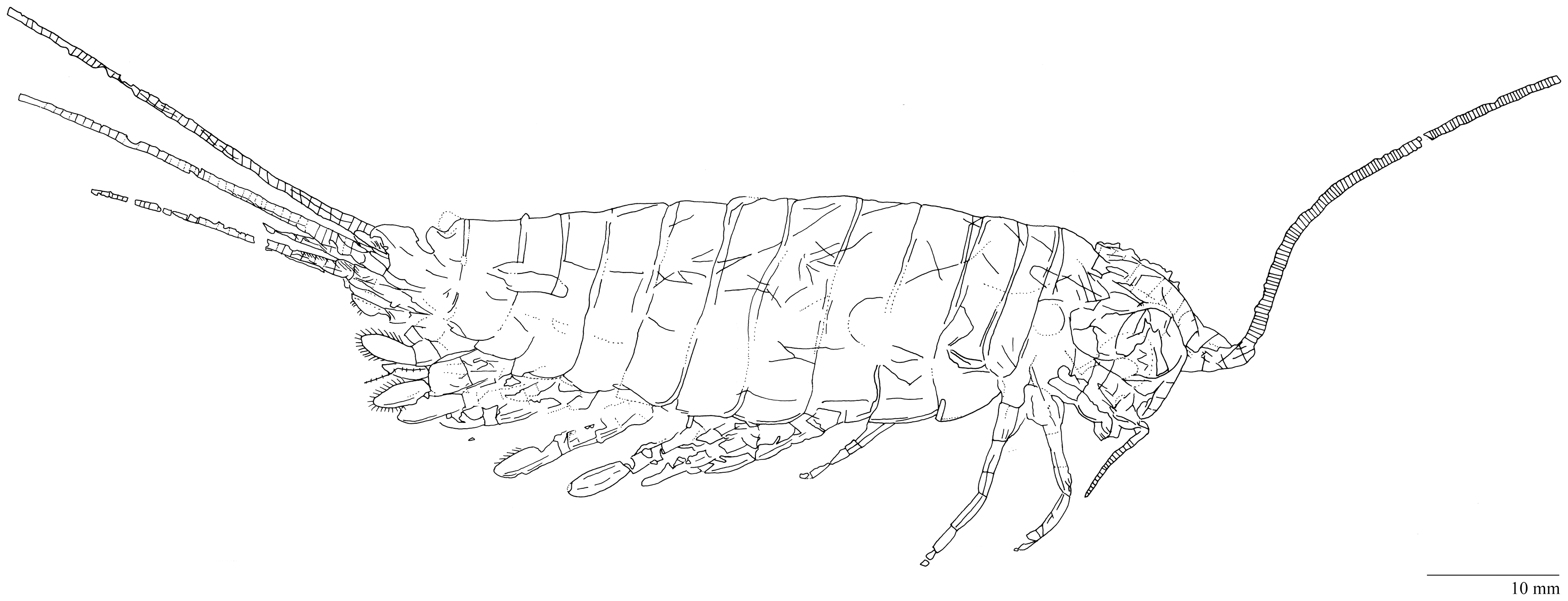
Camera lucida drawing of the holotype of Chosha praecursor (SDNHM 28852), a stem-insect, from the Tesnus Formation

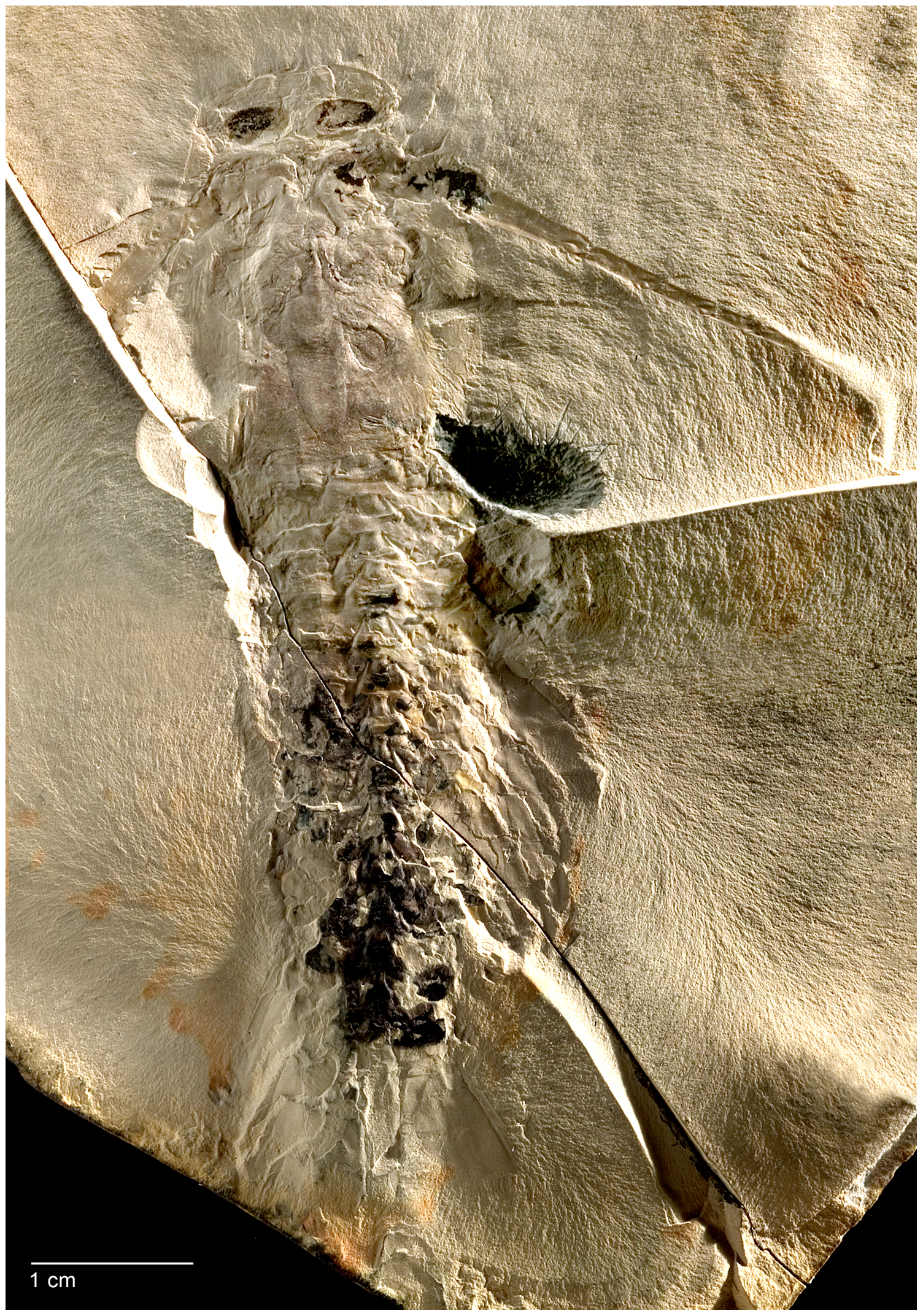
The holotype of Tesnusocaris goldichi, a fossil crustacean found in 1955 in the Tesnus Formation.

Locally, its shales contain carbonaceous plant fragments and spores and some of its sandstone beds contain wood casts up to 30 cm (12 in) long. Rare fossils of conodonts, radiolaria, sponge spicules, an insect, and inarticulate brachiopods have also been found in the Tesnus Formation. Notable taxaum described from the Tesnus Formation are Tesnusocaris, a remipedian, and Chosha, a possibly amphibious stem group insect.

Studies of radiolarian and conodont faunas indicate that the Tesnus Formation ranges in age from late Mississippian (Meramecian) to early Pennsylvanian (late Morrowan) in age.

== Depositional environments ==
The sediments comprising the Tesnus Formation accumulated within deep sea submarine fan and channel complexes. These sediments came dominantly from the southeast, likely from an approaching continental terrane that later collided with North America during the Ouachita orogeny. The Tesnus Formation and associated strata were folded into a northeast trending fold belt and thrust faulted northwestward by the Ouachita orogeny, which also formed the Ouachita Mountains of Arkansas and Oklahoma.

== See also ==
- List of fossiliferous stratigraphic units in Texas
- Paleontology in Texas
