= Testajapyx =

Testajapyx Temporal range: 309–307 Ma

Scientific classification
- Kingdom: Animalia
- Phylum: Arthropoda
- Clade: Pancrustacea
- Subphylum: Hexapoda
- Class: incertae sedis
- Family: †Testajapygidae
- Genus: †Testajapyx
- Species: †T. thomasi

Binomial name
- †Testajapyx thomasi Kukalová-Peck, 1987

Extinct genus of Carboniferous arthropod

Testajapyx is an extinct genus of hexapodan arthropod known from the Pennsylvanian Mazon Creek fossil beds in Illinois. It was described as the oldest known member of Diplura. However, subsequent authors have doubted this identification. The phylogenetic position of Testajapyx within Hexapoda is still unresolved. The type and only species is T. thomasi.

== Discovery and naming ==
The only known specimen of T. thomasi was discovered in the Mazon Creek fossil beds in Illinois. Those strata are dated to 309-307 Ma, during the Moscovian stage of the Pennsylvanian, Carboniferous. The fossil is preserved in a sideritic concretion, which is typical of that Lagerstätte. It was probably deposited in a brackish marine bay. The specimen is split inside, exposing both its ventral and dorsal features.

The specific name honors Thomas V. Testa who discovered the holotype.

== Description ==
The holotype of T. thomasi is 47.5 mm long without the antennae. The head is 4.6 mm long, a pair of large, functional eyes is located on the anterior half of the head. The antennae are long (10 mm) and consist of about 30 annuli. The mouthparts of T. thomasi were described as partially entognathous by Kukalova-Peck ; entognathy is a configuration in which the mouthparts are covered by lateral folds that create a pouch, it is typical of Entognatha. However, Kukalova-Peck noted that the mouthparts of T. thomasi are more exposed than in modern diplurans. In fact, the illustrations given by Kukalova-Peck do not show oral folds, which would lean toward a more ectognathic configuration for T. thomasi (opposite of entognathy : the mouthparts are exposed, which is usually observed in insects). The mouthparts include a pair of maxillary palps, a pair of labial palps, each consisting of eight segments and a pair of comb-like laciniae.

The prothorax, mesothorax and metathorax of T. thomasi have lateral lobes adjacent to the tergites. They are separated from the tergites by sutures. Kukalova-Peck suggested that these lateral lobes are of appendicular origin rather than expansions of the tergites. Her hypothesis is that the epicoxa, a proposed proximal segment of the legs of ancestral arthropods, would have fused with the terga to form the lateral surface where the leg is attached. According to Kukalova-Peck, exites (outgrowths) of the epicoxa would have evolved in a hypothetical structure, the protowing. Those protowings would have either evolved into wings or fused with epicoxa to form lateral lobes in wingless hexapods such as T. thomasi. The thoracic terga also have distinct sulci (grooves or furrows), which suggest a well-developed musculature. The six thoracic legs are well developed and articulated more ventrally than in modern diplurans. The leg is composed of eight articles: the coxa, the fused trochantero-prefemur, the femur, the patellotibia, the basitarsus, the tarsus (divided in two) and the posttarsus which bears two claws. The proximal articles of the thoracic legs bear conical exites.

The abdomen is 25 mm long and composed of eight-segments. As in the thorax, each segment bears lateral lobes. Each of the six anterior-most segments bears a pair of small, eight segmented, simple legs and large vesicles. The terminal segment bears a pair of cerci forming a forceps.

== Affinities ==
Kukalova-Peck considered that Testajapyx was related to the dipluran family Japygidae based on the presence of grasping cerci and established its own family: Testajapygidae. However, it also shares similarities with primitive ectognathans. Testajapyx differs from Japygidae by numerous characteristics such as the eyes which are large and well developed in Testajapyx whereas japygids are blind, the mouthparts of Testajapyx are more exposed ventrally than those of japygids, the maxillary palps of Testajapyx are composed of eight segments while those of diplurans are reduced to a single segment, the sclerotized body of Testajapyx with well visible sulci and sutures contrasts with the soft cuticle of diplurans, the thoracic legs of Testajapyx are more similar to those of basal insects, they are strong and articulated more ventrally than in japygids, which suggest that they were adapted to move efficiently whereas the legs of japygids are short and weak.

She assumed that the highly entognathous condition was derived from more exposed configurations and that it evolved separately in different entognathan lineages. This was supported by the discovery of the Jurassic Sinojapyx giganteus which can be confidently attributed to Diplura while having an ectognathous configuration.

For her, Testajapyx provided evidence that diplurans are derived from a common ancestor with Ectognatha (insects) and evolved independently from other entognathan lineages (Protura and Collembola), which therefore means that Entognatha would not be a monophyletic group and that Diplura is the sister group of Ectognatha. However, later authors considered that the attribution of Testajapyx to Diplura, mainly based on the cercal forceps, was not convincing, some even suggested that Testajapyx was a female earwig. As of now, the position of Testajapyx within Hexapoda is still unresolved.
