= Robert Latzel =

Austrian myriapodologist

- 1916 oil painting of Latzel
- Born: October 28, 1845; Uhelná (present day Czech Republic)
- Died: December 15, 1919 (aged 74); Klagenfurt, Austria
- Education: University of Vienna
- Known for: Myriapod taxonomy
- Spouse: Hedwig Horrakh
- Children: 1 son, 1 daughter
- Scientific career
- Fields: Myriapodology
- Author abbrev. (zoology): Latzel

Robert Latzel (28 October 1845 – 15 December 1919) was an Austrian myriapodologist and entomologist who published a series of pioneering works on millipedes, centipedes, and allies. His collection of myriapod specimens, today housed in the Natural History Museum of Vienna, includes many type specimens. His monographs on the myriapods of the Austro-Hungarian Empire were the first comprehensive treatments of the large region's centipede and millipede faunas. He named nearly 130 taxa of millipedes (1 genus, 2 subgenera, 69 species and 56 variations) and over 40 centipede groups (2 genera, 29 species and 12 variations), as well as four taxa each of pauropods and symphylans. His work on millipedes pioneered the use of gonopods in millipede classification and species recognition. At least three authors have honored Latzel by naming a genus Latzelia (Scudder 1890, Bollman 1893, Verhoeff, 1895).

== Major works ==
- (1880): Die Myriopoden der Österreichisch-ungarischen Monarchie. Erste Hälfte: Die Chilopoden. 1-228.
- (1884): Die Myriopoden der Österreichisch-ungarischen Monarchie. Zweite Hälfte. Die Symphylen, Pauropoden und Diplopoden. 1-414.

== Eponymous taxa ==
Genera and species named in honor of Latzel include:

- Latzelia Scudder 1890, type genus of Latzeliidae
- Latzelia Bollman 1893 preoccupied, = Glomeridella
- Latzelia Verhoeff 1895 preoccupied, = Verhoeffia
- Heterolatzelia Verhoeff 1897
- Cylindrus latzeli Berlese 1884
- Ornithogona latzeli Attems 1927
- Pycnotropis latzeli Attems 1931
- Nanogona latzeli Verhoeff 1891
- Escaryus latzeli Sseliwanoff 1881
- Gravieripus latzeli Cook 1896
