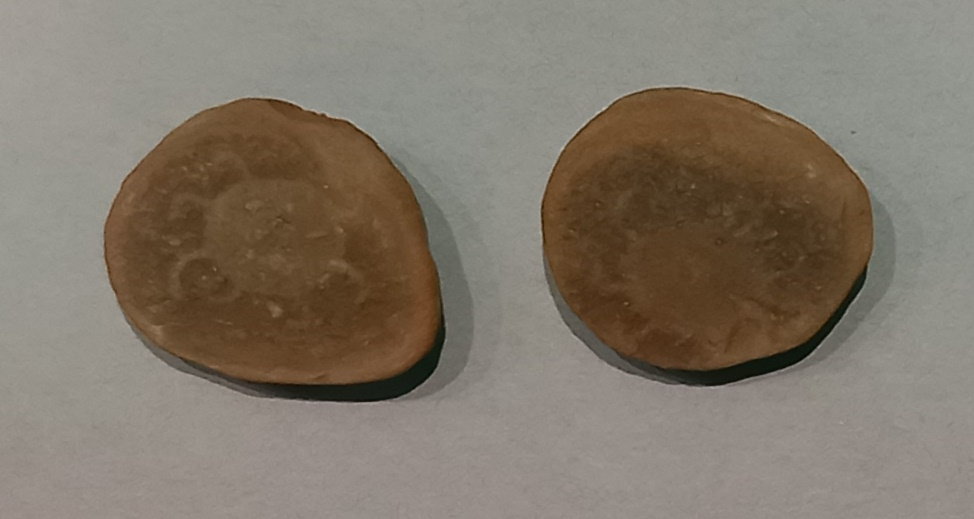
- Fossil specimens of Octomedusa pieckorum.

Scientific classification
- Kingdom: Animalia
- Phylum: Cnidaria
- Class: Scyphozoa
- Genus: †Octomedusa; Johnson & Richardson. 1968
- Species: †O. pieckorum

Binomial name
- †Octomedusa pieckorum Johnson & Richardson. 1968

= Octomedusa =

Octomedusa Temporal range: 309–307 Ma

Primitive Scyphozoan

Octomedusa is a genus of extinct scyphozoan jellyfish known from the Late Carboniferous sediments of the Mazon Creek fossil beds. It contains a single species, O. pieckorum. It was first described by Gordon Johnson and Eugene S. Richardson, Jr. in 1968, where its holotype (FMNH no. PE 11410) and paratype (FMNHno.PE 11377) being unearthed by Mr. and Mrs. Ted Piecko. Fossils of the jellyfish occur and other organisms occur in iron-stone concentrations. Octomedusa was described by Foster (1979) as representing a primitive coronate, however these affinities have been challenged and Octomedusa has had many more affinities after. O. pieckorum is the type species of the genus Octomedusa.

== History ==
In 1968, Ralph Gordon Johnson and Eugene S. Richardson, Jr. along with the help of Mr. and Mrs. Ted Piecko described O. pieckorum with uncertain affinities within the Incertae Sedis. Foster went on to describe Octomedusa as a Coronate Cnidarian; with the discovery of now-scientifically described "Blobs" (Essexella) from the same region as O. pieckorum Sroka, 1997, and Young & Hagadorn, 2010, described them as having problematic affinities. Young and Hagadorn also proposed the idea of Octomedusa as being a Narcomedusan Hydrozoan; although they did not give any explanation on why they assigned the jellyfish to that affinity and even if the fossils belonged to the order Narcomedusae it would be within the subclass Trachylinae as opposed to the other Aequoreids, which are found in the Leptomedusae.

== Etymology ==
The species name, pieckorum, is in honour of the fossil collectors Mr. and Mrs. Ted Piecko who have helped donate the holotype and paratype of Octomedusa to a museum for further studies and scientific descriptions.

== Description ==
Octomedusa possess 7-8 tentacles that each come from a pentagonal bell. Every tentacle is equal in length; they may vary, but never exceed the diameter of the cnidarian body. A narrow velum (velarium) is present in the organism and is 1 millimeter (0.039 in)-1 millimeter (0.039 in) in width. The large manubrium, represented by a square-central impression about 1 millimeter (0.039 in), contains a cruciform mouth. A smooth and scalloped margin are present in specimens, which was the result of artefacts made from preservation. Each tentacle has a length of 4 millimeters (0.16 in)-10 millimeters (0.39 in). The preserved remains of the organism are so general that they were originally not able to be assigned to either the true jellyfish or the hydroids.

== See also ==
- Essexella
