= Nozamichthys =

Nozamichthys Temporal range: Late Moscovian

Scientific classification
- Kingdom: Animalia
- Phylum: Chordata
- Class: Actinopterygii
- Order: †Palaeonisciformes
- Genus: †Nozamichthys; Schultze & Bardack, 1987

Type species
- †Nozamichthys contorta Schultze & Bardack, 1987

Extinct genus of ray-finned fishes

Nozamichthys is an extinct genus of ray-finned fish that lived during the late Moscovian stage of the Pennsylvanian epoch in what is now Illinois, United States. Fossils were collected from the Mazon Creek fossil beds. The first part of the genus name is Mazon spelled backwards, and the second part means 'fish' (Greek: ἰχθῦς ikhthûs).
