= Cryptocaris =

Cryptocaris Temporal range: Middle Pennsylvanian

Scientific classification
- Kingdom: Animalia
- Phylum: Arthropoda
- Clade: Pancrustacea
- Class: Remipedia
- Order: †Enantiopoda
- Family: †Tesnusocarididae
- Genus: †Cryptocaris; Schram, 1974
- Species: †C. hootchi

Binomial name
- †Cryptocaris hootchi Schram, 1974

Extinct genus of crustaceans

Cryptocaris is an extinct, monospecific genus of remipedes in the family Tesnusocarididae. It lived in what are now the Mazon Creek fossil beds in Illinois during the Middle Pennsylvanian.

The type and only species is C. hootchi.

== Classification ==
Cryptocaris was described by Frederick Schram in 1974, and was initially placed in the suborder Monokonophora. It was then reassigned to the extinct suborder Anthracocaridomorpha and placed in its own family, Cryptocarididae, in 1986.

Then, in 1991, it and Tesnusocaris were recognized as remipedes. The family Tesnusocarididae was erected to house both genera, with Tesnusocaris becoming the family's type genus, and Cryptocarididae a synonym of the family.
