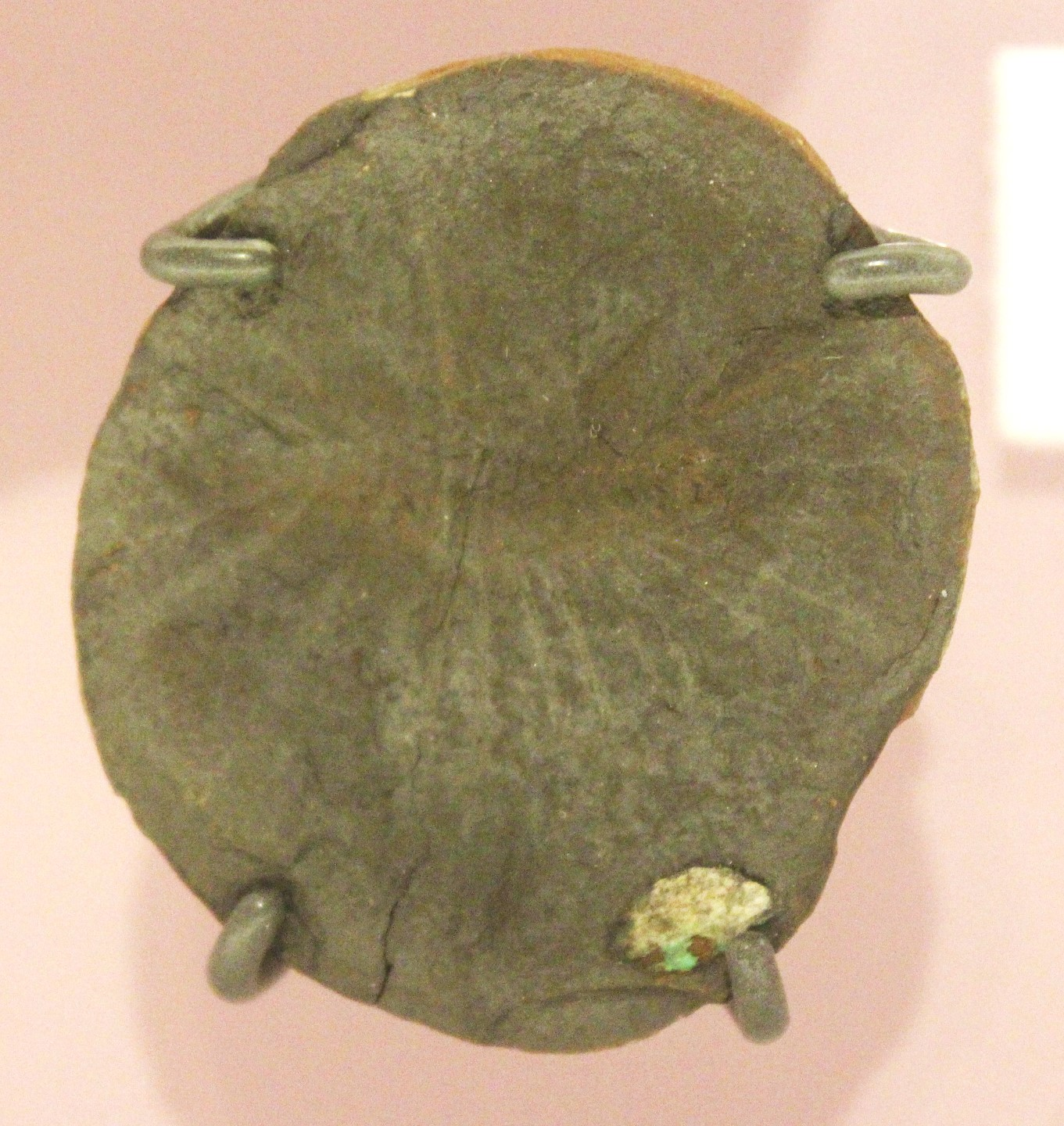
- Holotype specimen of L. primordialis (USNM 38003), National Museum of Natural History

Scientific classification
- Kingdom: Animalia
- Phylum: Arthropoda
- Subphylum: Myriapoda
- Class: Chilopoda
- Order: Scutigeromorpha
- Family: †Latzeliidae; Mundel, 1979
- Genus: †Latzelia; Scudder, 1890

Type species
- Latzelia primordialis Scudder, 1890

= Latzelia =

Extinct genus of centipedes

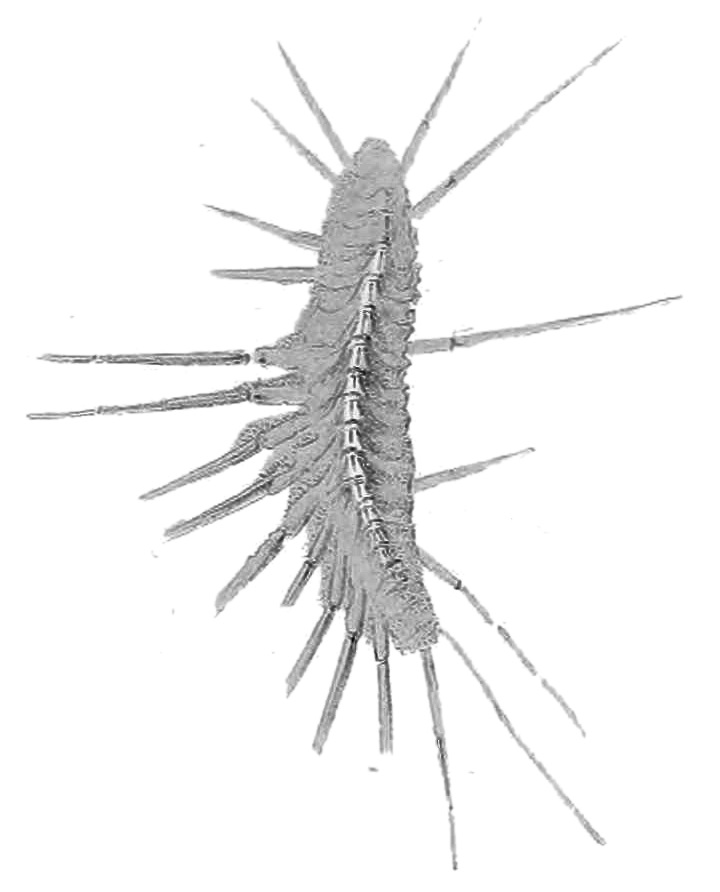
1890 illustration by J. H. Emerton

Latzelia is an extinct genus of scutigeromorph centipedes, and the type and only genus of the family Latzeliidae. It existed during the Carboniferous in what is now Illinois (found in Mazon Creek fossil beds). It was described by Samuel Hubbard Scudder in 1890, and the type species, and only known species, is Latzelia primordialis. The genus name honors Austrian zoologist Robert Latzel.

This centipede genus should not be confused with two invalid names applied to millipede genera: the first proposed Bollman in 1893 for a glomeridan species now in the genus Glomeridella, and the second by Verhoeff in 1895 for a genus of chordeumatidans now known as Verhoeffia.
