= Haplolepis =

Haplolepis Temporal range: Late Moscovian

Scientific classification
- Kingdom: Animalia
- Phylum: Chordata
- Class: Actinopterygii
- Family: †Haplolepidae
- Genus: †Haplolepis; Miller, 1892
- Species: †H. corrugata

Binomial name
- †Haplolepis corrugata (Newberry, 1856)

Synonyms
- Mecolepis corrugata Newberry, 1856

Extinct genus of ray-finned fishes

Haplolepis is an extinct genus of freshwater ray-finned fish that lived during the Pennsylvanian stage of the Carboniferous. It contains a single definite species, H. corrugata from the Moscovian-aged Allegheny Group of Ohio, US. Well-preserved specimens are known from the lagerstätte of the Upper Freeport Coal, and were first described by John Strong Newberry in the 1800s. A number of co-occurring species placed in Haplolepis have now been placed into other haplolepid genera. Another species, ?H. attheyi Westoll, 1944 from the Moscovian of Scotland is of uncertain taxonomy, and the specimen is now lost, although it may potentially belong to Protohaplolepis.
