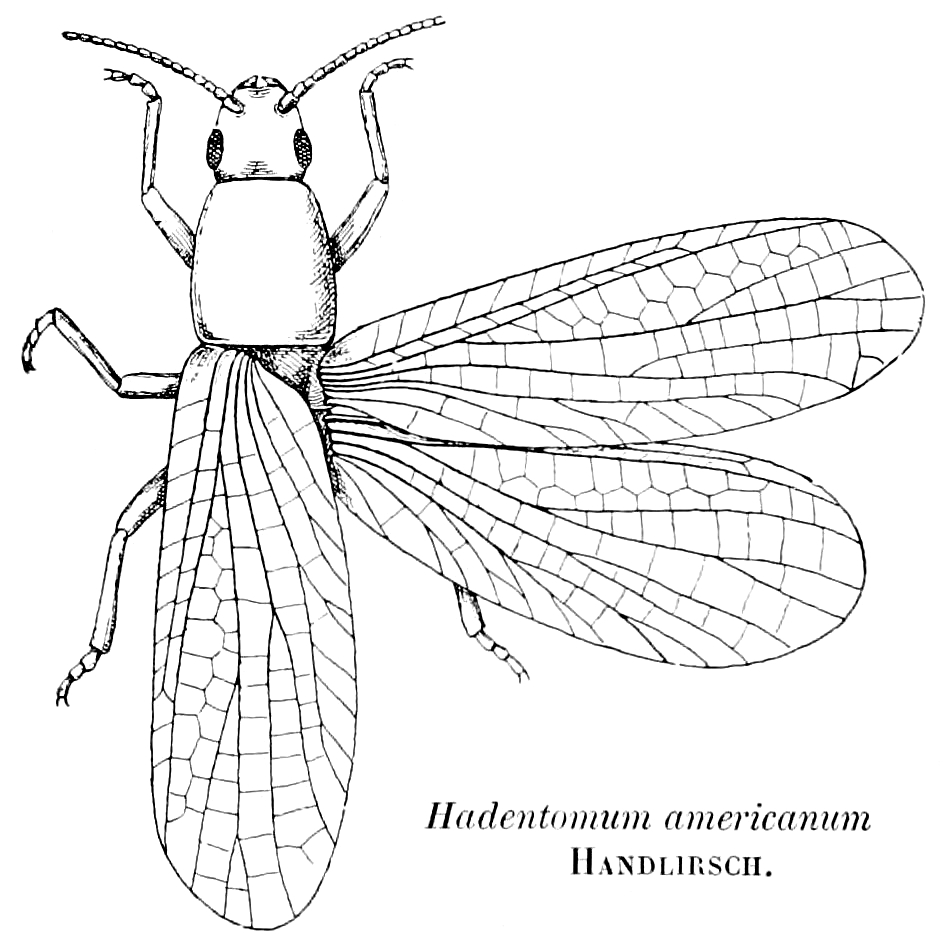
- Hadentomum americanum

Scientific classification
- Kingdom: Animalia
- Phylum: Arthropoda
- Class: Insecta
- Cohort: Polyneoptera
- Order: †Protorthoptera; Handlirsch, 1906

Families
- See text

Synonyms
- Cacurgida; Paraplecoptera; Protoblattodea; Protoblattoidea

= Protorthoptera =

Protorthoptera Temporal range: 318–299 Ma Middle Carboniferous

Extinct order of insects

The Protorthoptera are an extinct order of Palaeozoic insects, and represent a wastebasket taxon and paraphyletic assemblage of basal neoptera. They appear during the Middle Carboniferous (late Serpukhovian or early Bashkirian), making them among the earliest known winged insects in the fossil record. Pronotal lobes may be expanded to form a shield. The group includes the ancestors of all other polyneopterous insects.

== Families and genera ==
Protorthoptera

- †Adeloneuridae Carpenter, 1938
  - †Adeloneura Carpenter, 1938
- †Anthracoptilidae Handlirsch, 1922
  - †Anthracoptilus Lameere, 1917
- †Anthracothremmidae Handlirsch, 1906
  - †Anthracothremma Scudder, 1885
  - †Melinophlebia Handlirsch, 1911
  - †Pericalyphe Handlirsch, 1911
  - †Silphion Handlirsch, 1911
- †Apithanidae Handlirsch, 1911
  - †Apithanus Handlirsch, 1911
- †Asyncritidae Handlirsch, 1911
  - †Asyncritus Handlirsch, 1911
- †Blattinopsidae Bolton, 1925 (synonym Oryctoblattinidae Handlirsch, 1906)
  - †Blattinopsis Giebel, 1867
  - †Glaphyrokoris Richardson, 1956
  - †Glaphyrophlebia Handlirsch, 1906
  - †Protoblattiniella Meunier, 1912
- †Cheliphlebidae Handlirsch, 1911
  - †Cheliphlebia Scudder, 1885
- †Cymbopsidae Kukalova, 1965
  - †Cymbopsis Kukalova, 1965
- †Epimastacidae
- †Eucaenidae Handlirsch, 1906 (synonym Teneopteridae)
  - †Eucaenus Scudder, 1885
- †Hadentomidae Handlirsch, 1906 (synonym Hadentomoidea Handlirsch, 1906)
  - †Fabreciella
  - †Fayoliella
  - †Hadentomum Handlirsch, 1906
- †Hapalopteridae Handlirsch, 1906 (synonym Aenigmatodidae Handlirsch, 1906 & Hapalopteroidea Handlirsch, 1906)
  - †Aenigmatodes Handlirsch, 1906
  - †Hapaloptera Handlirsch, 1906
- †Heteroptilidae Carpenter, 1977
  - †Heteroptilon Carpenter, 1977
- †Homalophlebiidae Handlirsch, 1906
  - †Homalophlebia Brongniart, 1893
  - †Parahomalophlebia Handlirsch, 1906
- †Homoeodictyidae
  - †Homoeodictyon Carpenter, 1992
- †Pachytylopsidae
  - †Pachytylopsis Borre, 1875
  - †Protopachytylopsis Laurentiaux & Laurentiaux-Vieira, 1981
  - †Symballophlebia Handlirsch, 1904
- †Stenoneuridae
  - †Eoblattina Bolton, 1925
  - †Stenoneura Brongniart, 1893
- †Stereopteridae Carpenter, 1950
  - †Stereopterum Carpenter, 1950
- †Strephocladidae Martynov, 1938
  - †Homocladus Carpenter, 1966
  - †Paracladus Carpenter, 1966
  - †Strephocladus Scudder, 1885
- †Stygnidae Handlirsch, 1906
  - †Stygne Handlirsch, 1906
- †Thoronysididae
  - †Thoronysis Carpenter, 1992
- †Incertae sedis
  - †Acridites Germar, 1842
  - †Adiphlebia Scudder, 1885
  - †Agogoblattina Handlirsch, 1906
  - †Anthrakoris Richardson, 1956
  - †Archaeologus Handlirsch, 1906
  - †Archimastax Handlirsch, 1906
  - †Atava Sellards, 1909
  - †Axiologus Handlirsch, 1906
  - †Chrestotes Scudder, 1868
  - †Commentrya Lameere, 1917
  - †Didymophleps Scudder, 1885
  - †Endoiasmus Handlirsch, 1906
  - †Geraroides Handlirsch, 1906
  - †Gyrophlebia Handlirsch, 1906
  - †Hemerista Dana, 1864
  - †Lecopterum Sellards, 1909
  - †Megalometer Handlirsch, 1906
  - †Metacheliphlebia Handlirsch, 1906
  - †Miamia Dana, 1864
  - †Palaeocixius Brongniart, 1893
  - †Polyetes Handlirsch, 1906
  - †Pruvostia Bolton, 1921
  - †Pseudogerarus Handlirsch, 1906
  - †Pseudopolyernus Handlirsch, 1906
  - †Ptenodera Bolton, 1922
  - †Schuchertiella Handlirsch, 1911
