= Mazovermes =

Mazovermes Temporal range: Pennsylvanian

Scientific classification
- Kingdom: Animalia
- Phylum: Annelida
- Class: Polychaeta
- Genus: Mazovermes Nanglu, Wittry and McCoy, 2026
- Species: M. magnaterminus

Binomial name
- Mazovermes magnaterminus Nanglu, Wittry and McCoy, 2026

Mazovermes is an extinct genus of polychaete worm from the Carboniferous Mazon Creek fossil beds in Illinois. It contains one species, Mazovermes magnaterminus, whose discovery was notable for marking the first time a new species of polychaete had been discovered in the Mazon Creek fossil beds in 20 years.

== Discovery and naming ==
Mazovermes is known from four specimens: the holotype FMNH PE 93012, and the additional specimens FMNH PE 46898, FMNH PE 93013, and FMNH PE 93014. All known specimens were discovered from the Jugtown Road Locality of the Mazon Creek fossil beds. The Mazon Creek fossil beds are dated to the Pennsylvanian and are located in Illinois, USA.

The generic name combines the prefix mazo, in reference to the Mazon Creek fossil beds, with the Latin vermes, meaning worm. The specific name combines the Latin words magna, meaning large, and terminus, meaning end.

== Description ==
Mazovermes' body is composed of 32-42 segments. The segments become significantly larger towards the animal's posterior, creating a distinctive silhouette not seen in related taxa. The parapodia bear short chaetae.

Mazovermes fossils preserve fine striations associated with the parapodia that are thought to be preserved muscle tissue.

== Palaeobiology ==
The large posterior segments, with their backward-facing parapodia, may have secured Mazovermes in place. As such, Mazovermes likely did not move around much.

== Palaeoecology ==
During the time Mazovermes lived, the location in which the fossils were found was the northernmost end of an embayment, and likely experienced highly variable levels of salinity due to influence from the nearby freshwater coal swamp, as well as from the rain and tides. It is therefore thought that Mazovermes may have been able to tolerate variable salinity levels, perhaps allowing Mazovermes to become fairly common at this specific location.

20 species of annelids are known from the Mazon Creek fossil beds, yet prior to the discovery of Mazovermes, no new annelids had been discovered at the Mazon Creek fossil beds in 20 years.
