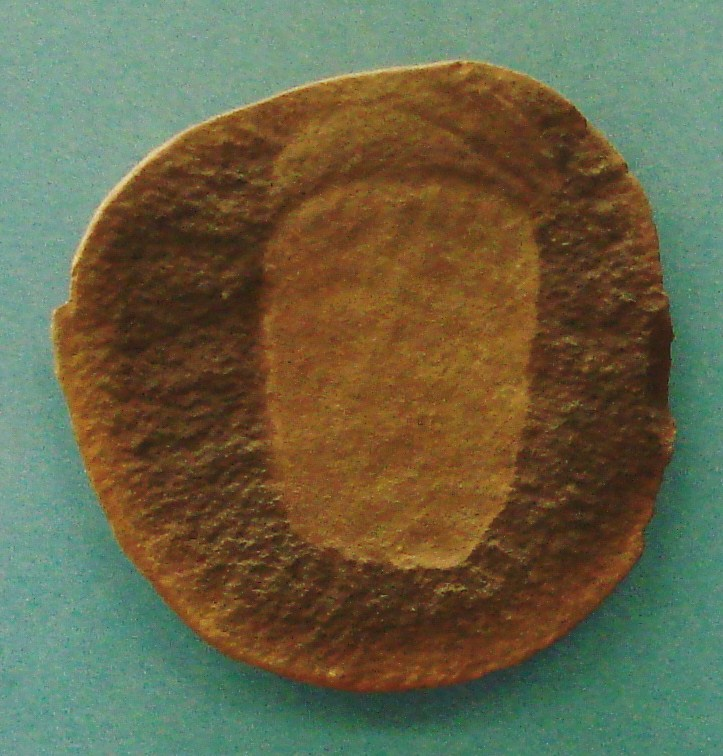
- Essexella asherae fossil on display at the Museo Civico di Storia Naturale di Milano

Scientific classification
- Kingdom: Animalia
- Phylum: Cnidaria
- Genus: †Essexella; Foster, 1979
- Species: †E. asherae

Binomial name
- †Essexella asherae Foster, 1979

= Essexella =

Essexella Temporal range: Late Carboniferous

Extinct cnidarian

Essexella is an extinct genus of cnidarian known from Late Carboniferous fossils; it contains a single species, E. asherae. It is one of the most recurrent organisms in the Mazon Creek fossil beds of Illinois; in the Essex biota of Mazon Creek, it consists of 42% of all fossil finds. Essexella was originally described as a jellyfish, but was recently redescribed as a sea anemone.

Another alleged jellyfish, Reticulomedusa, is likely Essexella preserved from different angles. Essexella may have produced the common trace fossil Conostichus.

== See also ==
- Octomedusa
