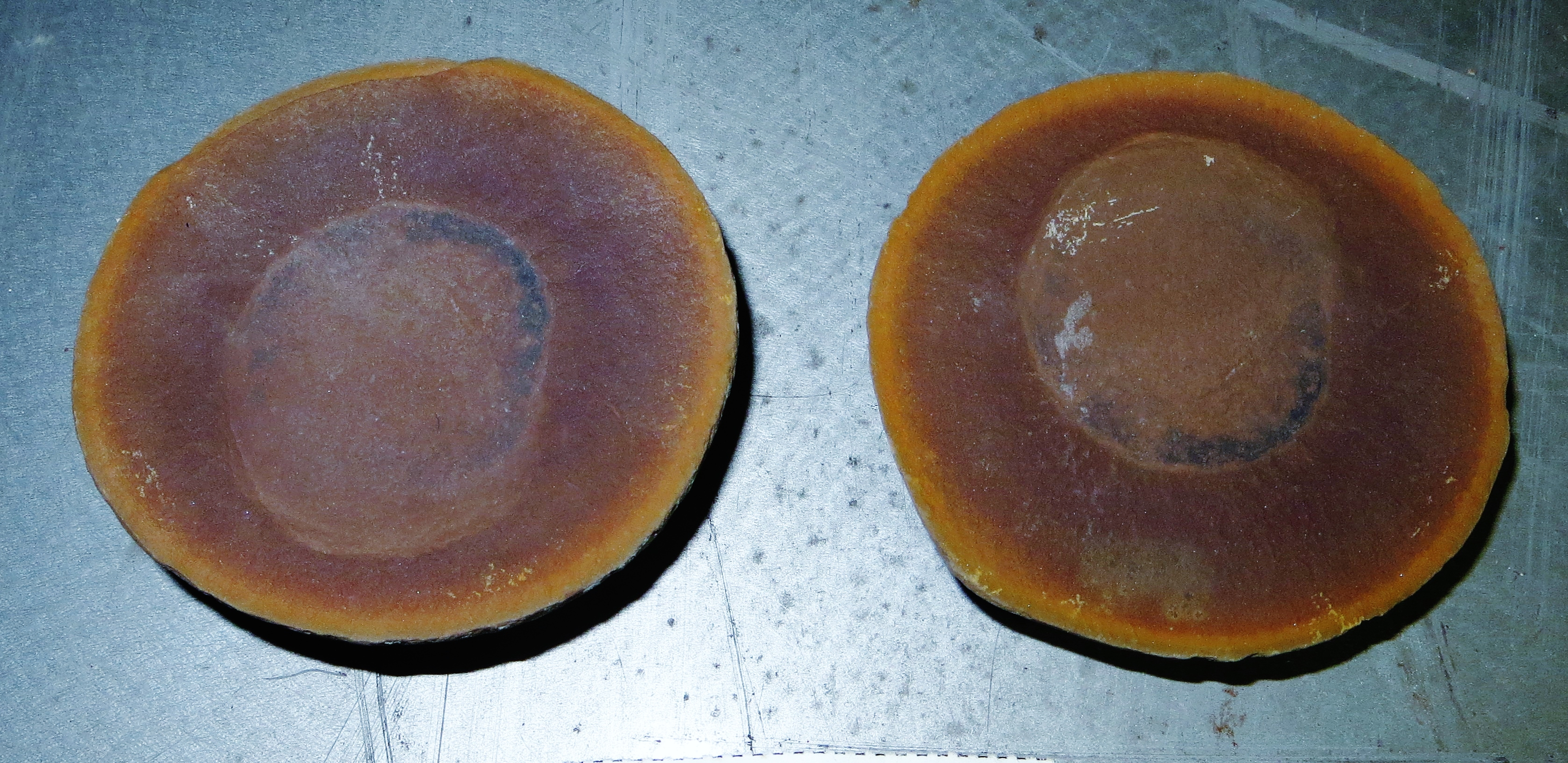

Scientific classification
- Kingdom: Animalia
- Phylum: Cnidaria
- Genus: †Reticulomedusa Foster, 1979
- Species: †R. greenei

Binomial name
- †Reticulomedusa greenei Foster, 1979

= Reticulomedusa =

Reticulomedusa Temporal range: 309–307 Ma

Extinct genus of prehistoric cnidarian

Reticulomedusa is an extinct genus of prehistoric cnidarian containing a single species, Reticulomedusa greenei. It is known from the Mazon Creek located in Illinois. Although it was once described as jellyfish, it may be pedal or oral disc of Essexella which is reinterpreted as sea anemone.
