= Kewanee Group =

Geologic group in Indiana, United States

- Stratigraphic range: Carboniferous
- Type: Group

Location
- Region: Indiana
- Country: United States

The Kewanee Group is a geologic group in Indiana and Illinois. It preserves fossils dating back to the Carboniferous period.

== See also ==
- List of fossiliferous stratigraphic units in Indiana

== Works cited ==
- Various Contributors to the Paleobiology Database. "Fossilworks: Gateway to the Paleobiology Database". Archived from the original on 19 August 2022.
