= Edmondiidae =

Scientific classification
- Domain: Eukaryota
- Kingdom: Animalia
- Phylum: Mollusca
- Class: Bivalvia
- Order: Adapedonta
- Family: Edmondiidae

Family of bivalves

Edmondiidae is a family of bivalves belonging to the order Adapedonta.

Genera:

- Cardiomorpha de Koninck, 1842
- Edmondia de Koninck, 1841
- Globicarina Waterhouse, 1965
- Notomya M'Coy, 1847
- Scaldia Ryckholt, 1852
