= Xibalbanus cozumelensis =

Scientific classification
- Kingdom: Animalia
- Phylum: Arthropoda
- Clade: Pancrustacea
- Class: Remipedia
- Order: Nectiopoda
- Family: Xibalbanidae
- Genus: Xibalbanus
- Species: X. cozumelensis

Binomial name
- Xibalbanus cozumelensis Olesen, Meland, Glenner, van Hengstum & Iliffe, 2017

Species of remipedes from Cozumel

Xibalbanus cozumelensis is a species of remipedes in the Xibalbanus genus and the family Xibalbanidae. This species only lives in the Cueva Quebrada anchialine cave system in Cozumel.

== Description ==
As every remipede, Xibalbanus cozumelensis has an elongate body and has so eyes or pigmentation. The species ranges from 30 to 35 mm in length. There are up to 39 trunk segments. Most trunk segments have subrectangular tergites with rounded lateral margins.

The head shield partly covers the first trunk segments and the proximal part of the head appendages. The first antennae are about 1/6 of the body length, they are biramous and bear aesthetascs and short setae. The antennae of the second pair are also biramous, however, they are much smaller and paddle-like. The gnathal edge of the mandibles consists of a molar process, an incisor process, and a lacinia mobilis. The labrum is prominent and bulbous.

The first maxillae have seven segments. They are uniramous and robust, the second maxillae are longer and slender. The maxillipeds have eight segments are longer and more slender than the second maxillae. The limbs are natatory and biramous: the protopods are large, the exopods have three segments while the endopods have four. There are long plumose setae along the margins. The caudal rami are very slender.

== Classification ==
Xibalbanus cozumelensis has been found to have lower genetic distance from its closest species Xibalbanus tulumensis than expected given that the Yucatán Peninsula where Xibalbanus tulumensis lives and Cozumel have been separated since the early Cenozoic. The following scenario is proposed: the speciation happened when the Yucatán Peninsula and Cozumel were first separated and both species experienced very low rates of divergence due to the isolated and stable environment of the anchialine systems where they live. Another hypothesis is that, during the Pleistocene ice age, when sea levels were lower, remipeds would have been constrained to disperse vertically and may have crossed the Yucatán Channel through caves and crevices.

Phylogenetic tree by Olesen, Meland, Glenner, van Hengstum & Iliffe (2017):

- Remipedia
  - Godzilliidae
    - - Godzilliognomus frondosus
      - Godzilliognomus schrami
    - - Godzillius fuchsi
      - Godzillius robustus
  - - Kumongidae
      Kumonga exleyi
    - Angirasu parabenjamini
    - Cryptocorynetidae
      - Angirasu benjamini
      - - Cryptocorynetes haptodiscus
        - - Cryptocorynetes elmorei
          - - Cryptocorynetes longulus
    - - - Morlockiidae
          - Speleonectes gironensis
          - - - Morlockia atlantida
              - Morlockia ondinae
            - - Morlockia emersoni
              - Morlockia williamsi
        - Xibalbanidae
          - Xibalbanus fuchscockburni
          - - Xibalbanus cozumelensis
            - - Xibalbanus tulumensis
      - - - Speleonectes sp.n.2
          - Speleonectes sp.n.4
        - - Pleomothridae
            - Pleomothra sp.
            - - Pleomothra apletocheles
              - Pleomothra fragilis
          - Speleonectidae
            - Lasionectes entrichoma
            - - Speleonectes lucayensis
              - Speleonectes kakuki
