= Kaloketos =

Scientific classification
- Kingdom: Animalia
- Phylum: Arthropoda
- Class: Remipedia
- Order: Nectiopoda
- Family: Cryptocorynetidae
- Genus: Kaloketos; Koenemann, Iliffe & Yager, 2004
- Species: K. pilosus

Binomial name
- Kaloketos pilosus Koenemann, Iliffe & Yager, 2004

Monospecific genus of remipedes

Kaloketos is a monospecific genus of remipedes in the family Cryptocorynetidae. The only species is Kaloketos pilosus. The genus name is composed of the Greek words kalos, meaning "beautiful" and ketos, meaning "sea monster". The specific name pilosus is a Latin word for "hairy", it refers to the important spines and setae on its legs.

== Description ==
Two specimens were studied. The body is long and robust. The holotype has 41 trunk somites and is 29 mm long while the other specimen has 40 trunk somites and is 26.5 mm long.

The pleurotergites are well-developed. Their distolateral corners are rounded on segments 2-11 while they are more acuminate posteriorly. The posterolateral corners of the trunk sternites are pointed. As in other remipedes, Kaloketos pilosus is hermaphroditic: the female gonopores are situated on the seventh trunk segment and are small, male gonopores are situated on the fourteenth trunk segment and are large and cylindrical.

The limbs of the anterior-most and posterior-most trunk segments are smaller and narrower than the other ones. Each limb has a four-segmented endopod (the inner branch of a biramous arthropod appendage) and a three-segmented exopod (the outer branch of a biramous arthropod appendage). Their segments are wide and bear dense rows of plumose setae and small spines.

The head shield is subquadrangular and fully covers the first trunk segment. The antennules are composed of a slightly dilated ventrally peduncle that bear dense rows of aesthetascs (sensorial setae in crustaceans often found on the antennules) and of two flagella: the dorsal one is longer than the ventral one, they both carry small setae. The antennae are composed of a two segment protopod (first part of an arthropod appendage), an exopod and an endopod. The mandibles are composed of an incisor process, a lacinia mobilis and a molar process. The incisor process and the lacinia mobilis both bear large denticles. Kaloketos pilosus also possesses a pair of maxillae and a pair of maxillules that bear spines and setae and small claws.

== Distribution and habitat ==
Kaloketos pilosus lives in an anchialine system, Cottage Pond. Cottage Pond is a submerged sinkhole located in the North Caicos Island in the Lucayan Archipelago, Caribbean. It opens into a large collapse chamber reaching a water depth of 80 meters. The water is stratified between freshwater at the top and saltwater (from 20 to 30 meters deep to the bottom of the system). They are separated by an halocline. Kaloketos pilosus was found between depth of 25 and 46 meters, below the hapocline and so in fully fully haline salinities and in the total darkness. It was observed freely swimming in the water column.

The stygofauna of Cottage Pond includes the annelid Pelagomacellicephala iliffei, the copepods Azygonectes plumosus and Caiconectes antiquus, the isopod Bahalana caicosana, the decapod Agostocaris williamsi, the leptostracan Speonebalia cannoni, the ostracod Deeveya spiralis, the remipeds Godzillius robustus, Lasionectes entrichoma and Kaloketos pilosus.

== Classification ==
Kaloketos pilosus was originally classified in the family Speleonectidae based on its rectangular head shield, long ventral antennular flagella, asymmetrical mandibles, and the shape of the three prehensile limbs. However, Hoenemann et al. (2013), assigned the species to the newly named family Cryptocorynetidae based on morphological observations, unfortunately, they could not include Kaloketos pilosus in their phylogenetic analysis because of the lack of molecular data. Kaloketos pilosus is also treated as a member of Cryptocorynetidae by Gonzalez et al. (2020).
