= Pleomothra =

Scientific classification
- Kingdom: Animalia
- Phylum: Arthropoda
- Clade: Pancrustacea
- Class: Remipedia
- Order: Nectiopoda
- Family: Pleomothridae; Hoenemann et al., 2013
- Genus: Pleomothra; Yager, 1989

Type species
- Pleomothra apletocheles Yager, 1989

Other species
- Pleomothra fragilis Koenemann, Ziegler & Iliffe, 2008

Genus of crustaceans

Pleomothra is a genus of crustaceans found in the Bahamas. First described in 1989, the genus has 2 identified species as of 2008. It is the sole member of the family Pleomothridae, but was previously placed in the family Godzilliidae. The family is named after the fictional giant moth monster Mothra.

The genus is in the group Remipedia where all species are blind, and the entire body consists of a single, long line of joints. Individuals swim slowly on their backs.

== Etymology ==
The name of the family was coined in 1989 by biologist Jill Yager to describe the crustacean's unique swimming habits and to keep a thematic naming trend going. The first remipede ever described in that cave family was named Godzillius in the family Godzilliidae (which was named after Godzilla), so she chose to name it after Mothra, another kaiju, for the next discovery.
