= Micropacter =

Scientific classification
- Kingdom: Animalia
- Phylum: Arthropoda
- Class: Remipedia
- Order: Nectiopoda
- Family: Micropacteridae; Koenemann, Iliffe & van der Ham, 2007
- Genus: Micropacter; Koenemann, Iliffe & van der Ham, 2007
- Species: M. yagerae

Binomial name
- Micropacter yagerae Koenemann, Iliffe & van der Ham, 2007

Genus of crustaceans

Micropacter is a monospecific genus of remipedes in the family Micropacteridae, of which it is the only member. It was discovered in anchialine caves on the Turks and Caicos Islands.

The type and only species is M. yagerae, named after American zoologist and cave diver Jill Yager, who discovered the first remipede in 1979.
