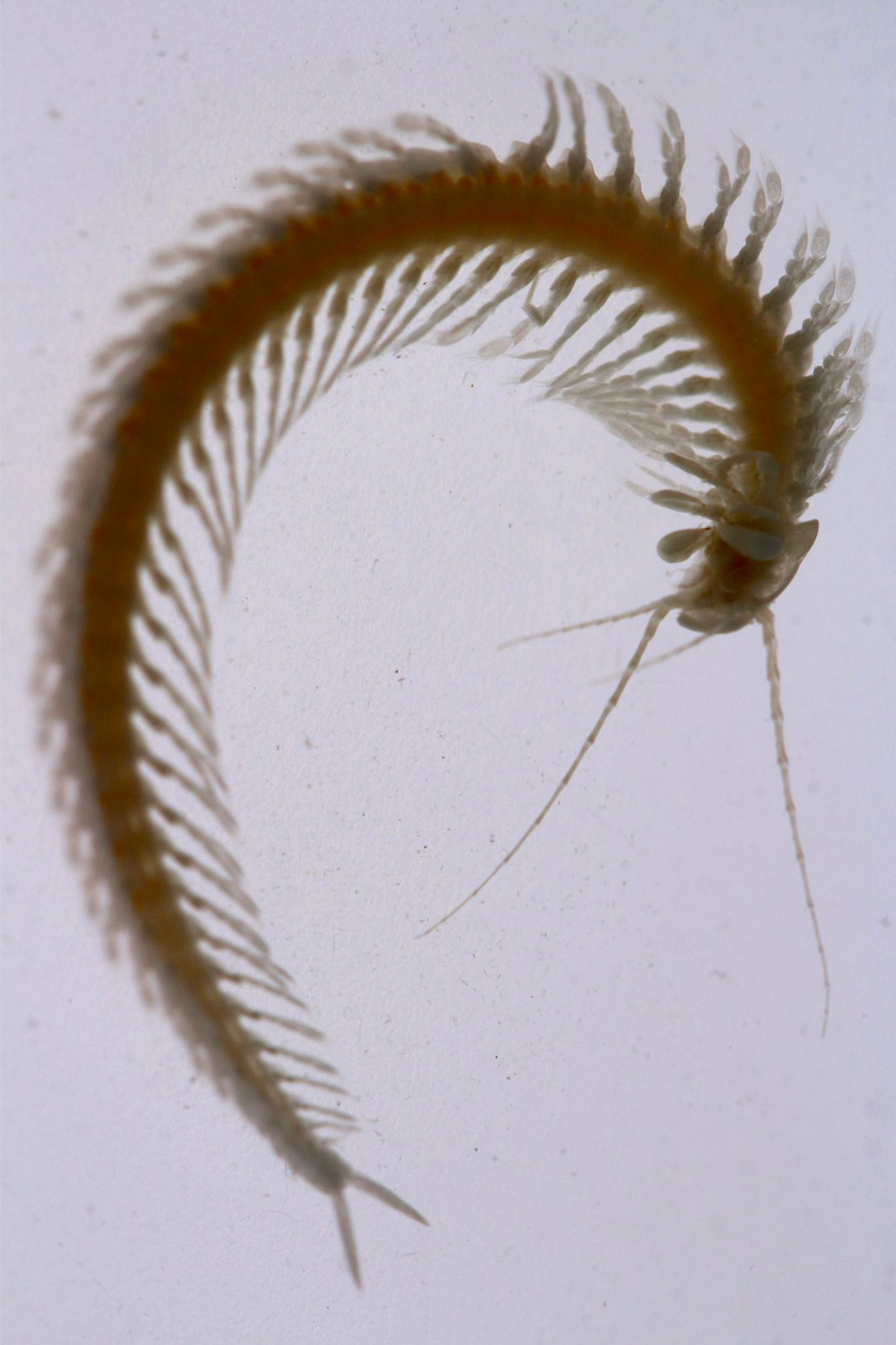
- Xibalbanus tulumensis

Scientific classification
- Kingdom: Animalia
- Phylum: Arthropoda
- Clade: Pancrustacea
- Class: Remipedia
- Order: Nectiopoda
- Family: Xibalbanidae
- Genus: Xibalbanus; Hoenemann, Neiber, Schram & Koenemann, 2013

Species
- See text

= Xibalbanus =

Genus of remipedes

Xibalbanus is a genus of remipedes, which belongs to the monotypic family Xibalbanidae. All species live in anchialine systems in the Yucatán Peninsula except X. cozumelensis, that lives in Cozumel.

== Etymology ==
The genus name is composed of "Xibalba", the underworld in ancient Mayan mythology, and the Latin suffix-anus, meaning “originating from.”

== Species ==
- Xibalbanus cokei Yager, 2013
- Xibalbanus cozumelensis Olesen, Meland, Glenner, van Hengstum & Iliffe, 2017
- Xibalbanus fuchscockburni Neiber, Hansen, Iliffe, Gonzalez & Koenemann, 2012
- Xibalbanus tulumensis Yager, 1987
