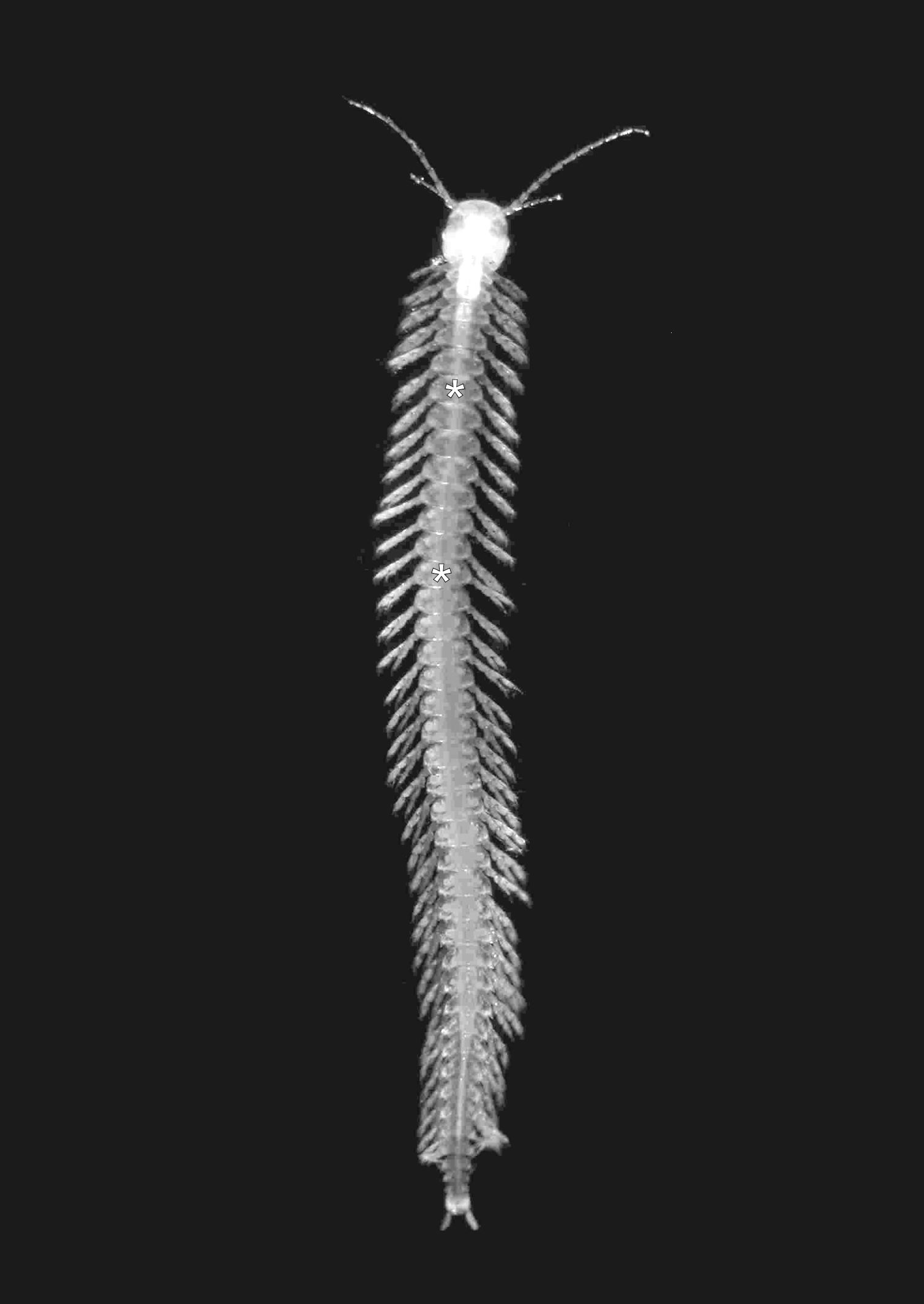
- Speleonectes tanumekes

Scientific classification
- Kingdom: Animalia
- Phylum: Arthropoda
- Clade: Pancrustacea
- Clade: Allotriocarida
- Class: Remipedia; Yager, 1981

Orders & families
- See text

= Remipedia =

Remipedes Temporal range: Lower Pennsylvanian–Recent

Class of crustaceans

Remipedia is a class of blind crustaceans. They are members of Allotriocarida, making them among the closest known relatives of hexapods such as insects. They are found in coastal aquifers which contain saline groundwater, with populations identified in almost every ocean basin so far explored, including in Australia, the Caribbean Sea, and the Atlantic Ocean.

The first described Remipede was the fossil Tesnusocaris goldichi (Lower Pennsylvanian). Since 1979, at least seventeen living species have been identified in subtropical regions around the world. Remipedes are divided into two orders: Nectiopoda and †Enantiopoda, which may or may not actually be related to each other.

== Anatomy ==
Remipedes are elongate, slender and blind crustaceans ranging in length from approximately 8 to 9 mm (0.31 to 0.35 in) in adults of smaller species such as Godzilliognomus frondosus to 45 mm (1.8 in) in larger species such as Godzillius robustus. Similarly to many troglofauna (animals which live underground), nectiopodans have no pigmentation and are eyeless. The body is divided into two main tagmata (grouping of segments into a morphological unit): the cephalon and the trunk. They do not have the carapace of some other crustaceans.

=== Head ===
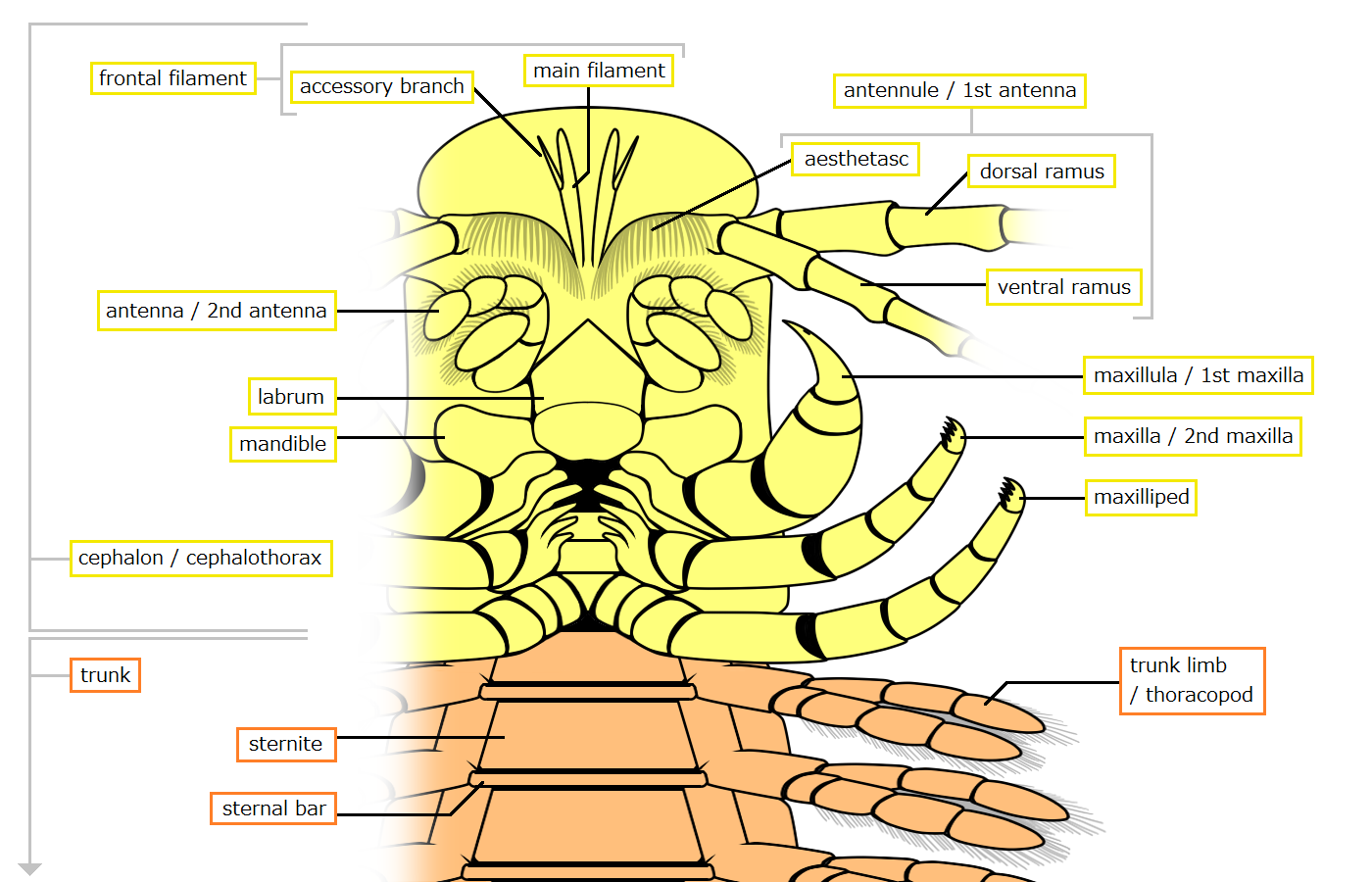
Diagram of the ventral side of the head of nectiopodans

The head is quite short, and is covered by a larger head shield. The shield is generally a rounded oblong, however, the shape and features of that shield can be different between the species, for example, Pleomothra fragilis has two curved, elongate, rather long and thin spine-like posterolateral processes. In most species, the shield taper anteriorly, making a shallow notch for the lateral extension of the antennules. In some taxa, it also partially covers the first trunk segment. The cephalic shield bears a pair of short bifurcate filamentous processes on its ventral anterior margin between the bases of the antennules. Between the mandibles and antennae is a robust labrum that overhangs the mouth.

==== Head appendages ====
The head has six fused, appendage-bearing somites (segments). The six pairs of appendages are the following: the antennules, the antennae, the mandibles, two pairs of maxillae and the maxillipeds.

The antennules (or first antennae) are long biramous appendages. The basal-most part is the protopod (or peduncle). It bears aesthetascs (small hair-like olfactory receptors in crustaceans). The protopod forks into two unequally sized branches. The dorsal branch is longer than the ventral branch (that is actually a flagellum) in every nectiopodan. The dorsal branch reach up to about 10-15% of the body length to 60% of the body length depending on the species. The antennae are small and biramous. The protopod is two-segmented, it bears a flap-like, undivided exopod (outer branch of a biramous arthropod appendage) and a three-segmented endopod (inner branch).

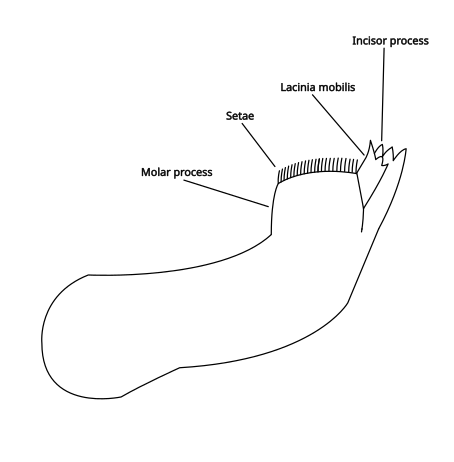
Diagram of the right mandible of a nectiopodan remipede.

The mandibles are well-developed. Each mandible is composed of three main gnathal processes: the extended, broad and curved chewing molar process that bears rows of robust setae, the toothed incisor process and, parallel to it, the smaller toothed lacinia mobilis, which, unlike that of other crustaceans and contrary to what the name suggests, is not movable in remipedes. The incisor processes and laciniae mobiles of the two mandibles are asymmetrical: in the right mandible, they both bear three denticles, but on the left mandible, the incisor process has four denticles and the lacinia mobilis is smaller and often has more numerous smaller denticles.

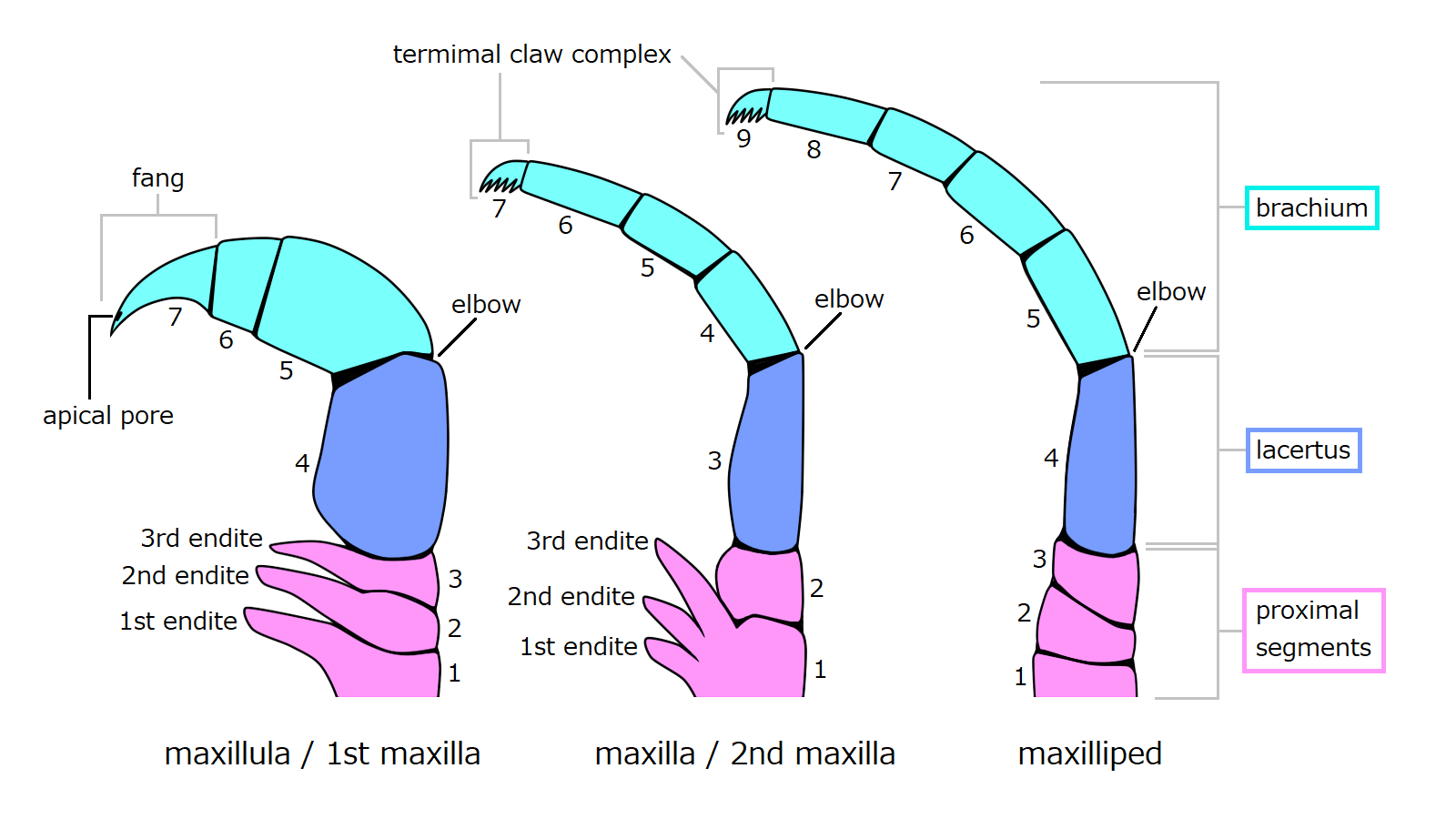
Diagram of the maxillule, maxilla and maxilliped of nectiopodan remipedes.

Posterior to the mandibles are three pairs of uniramous, well-developed, prehensile and raptorial appendages. The maxillules (or first maxillae) and the maxillae (or second maxillae) are composed of 7 segments while the maxilliped is composed of nine segments. The proximal segments of the maxillules bear endites. The fourth segment, the lacertus, is large, robust and bears setae in some species. The distal-most segments (forming the brachium) are separated from the lacertus by an "elbow". The terminal segment is a claw. The massive maxillules of Pleomothra stand out against other remipedes by the fact that they are only composed of six segments. The maxillae and the maxillipeds are similarly built. The first proximal segment of the maxillae bears three endites. The terminal claw is smaller than in the maxillules and is composed of numerous spines. The maxillipeds are similar, however, they lack endites and have two more segments.

=== Trunk ===
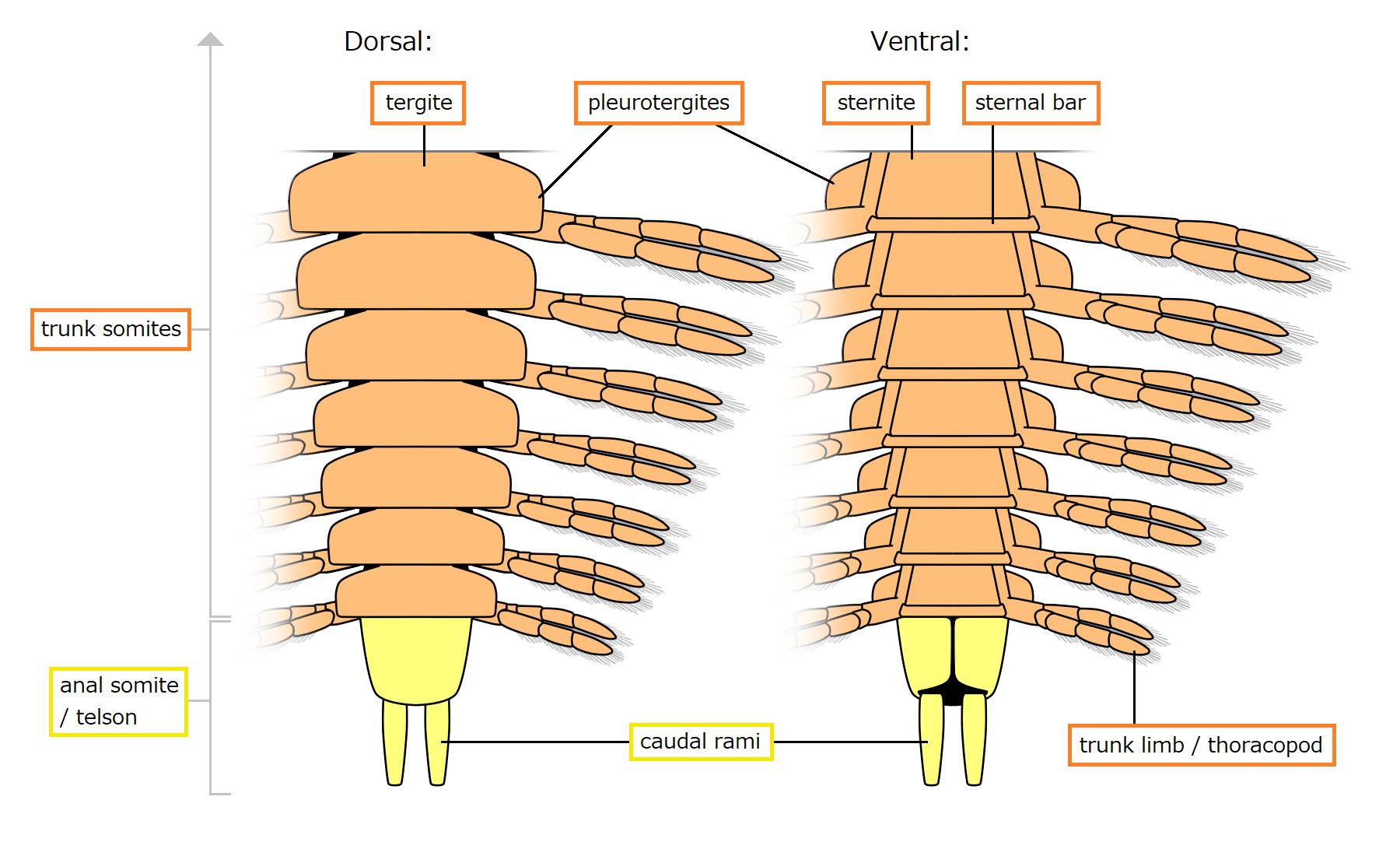
Diagram of the posterior part of the nectiopodan trunk.

The trunk has no distinct tagma: the trunk is homonomously segmented. Each somite is composed of several sclerites: a dorsal tergite, more or less developed lateral pleurotergites, a ventral sternal plate and an associated sternal bar. Larger species can have between 20 and 40 trunk somites or even more. Their number and the total body length seem to increase with age without defined limitation. However, in small species such as Godzilliognomus frondosus, the fewer number of somites (16) is fixed. Although the trunk is not divided into tagmata, the somites are variable throughout the body: the first trunk somite, which is more or less covered by the head shield depending on the species, is noticeably shorter and narrower than the following somites. Starting from the largest somites in the middle of the trunk, they gradually decrease in size towards the end of the body. The body ends by a terminal anal somite, that possesses no limb and bears a pair of cylindrical caudal rami that can reach more than twice the length of the anal somite.

==== Trunk appendages ====
The trunk appendages are biramous and paddle-like. The protopod (proximal part of the appendage) carries a three-segmented exopod (outer branch) and a four-segmented endopod (inner branch). They bear important setae. The female gonopores are situated on the protopods of the seventh pair of trunk appendages while the male gonopores are situated on the protopods of the fourteenth pair of trunk appendages.

=== Venom ===
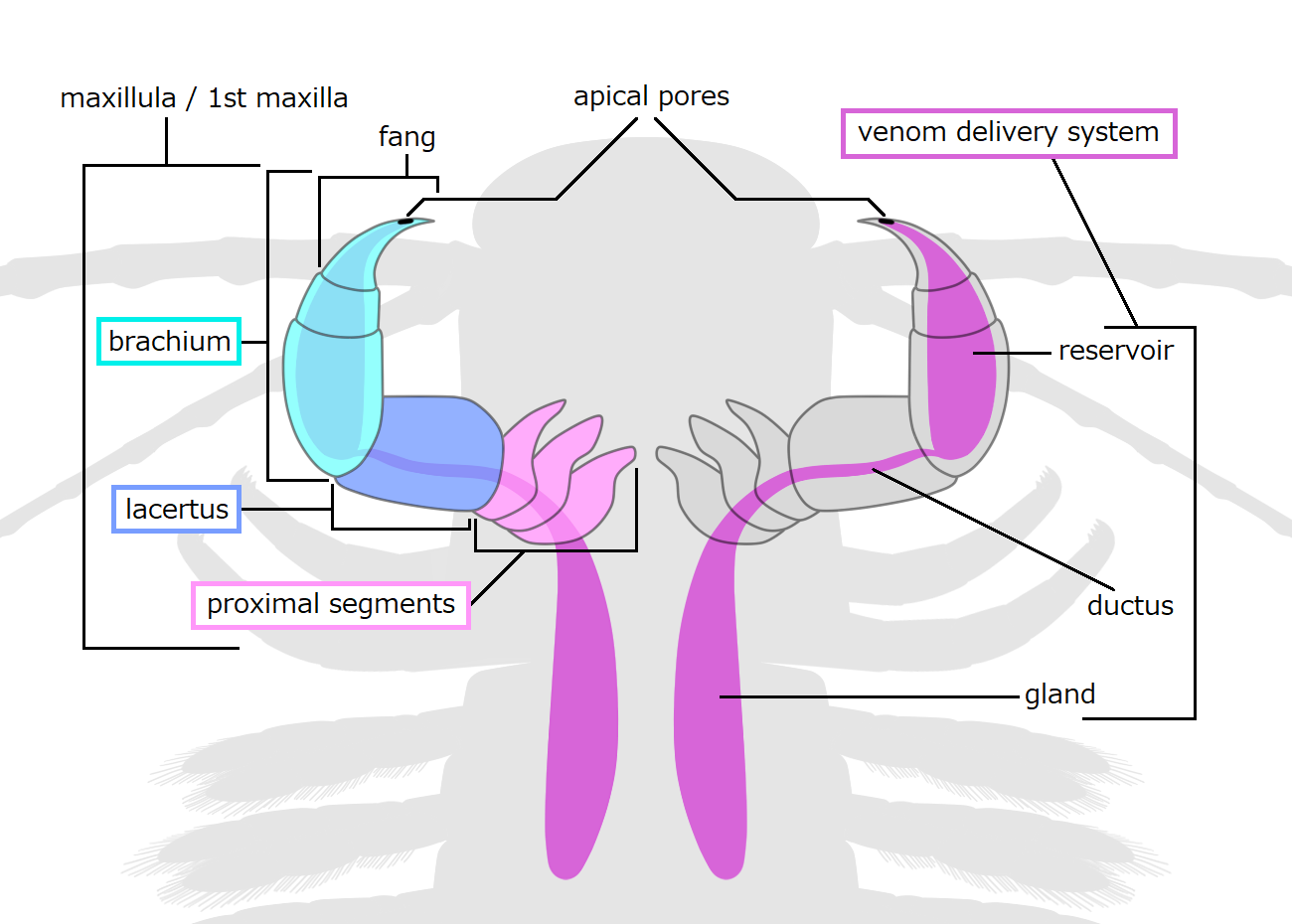
Diagram of the venom apparatus of nectiopodan remipedes.

Nectiopodan remipedes possess a highly developed venom apparatus. Two equally sized venom glands are situated in the anterior trunk, which are linked to reservoirs in the brachia via ducts. Around each reservoir are two large muscles used to expel the venom. Four adductor muscles help the stabbing motion of the maxillules and prevent the backflow of the venom. The major components of this venom are the peptidase S1 (PS1), enzymes which may play a role in immobilization and digestion of the prey. Chitinases are the second most abundant toxin type, and are used to break down the chitinous exoskeletons of their prey. This toxin is present in a particularly important quantity in nectiopodans. The venom also possesses neurotoxins, which are likely used to paralyze their prey.

== Ecology ==
Most remipedes live in dark, poorly oxygenated saltwater. The only exception is Speleonectes epilimnius that lives in highly oxygenated surface water. Nectiopodan remipedes tend to live in anchialine systems. Most species are found in the Caribbean region (Turks and Caicos Islands, the Bahamas and Yucatán for example). A few species occur in the Túnel de la Atlántida lava tube in the Canary Islands. The isolated species Lasionectes exleyi lives in one cave in western Australia. The only species known not to live exclusively in an anchialine system is Speleonectes kakuki which was found in a fully marine sub-seafloor cave in the Bahamas.

Distribution

Extant remipedes (Nectiopoda) are found in the following regions:

- Bahamas – Andros, Sweetings Cay, Grand Bahama, Great Exuma, Great Guana Cay (Exuma Cays), Cat Island, Abaco Islands, San Salvador Island
- Turks and Caicos Islands – North Caicos, Providenciales
- Australia – North West Cape (Western Australia)
- Cuba – Matanzas Province
- Spain – Lanzarote (Canary Islands)
- Mexico – Quintana Roo
- Belize - Caye Chapel
- Dominican Republic – Distrito Nacional Cueva Taína, Santo Domingo Este.

Several hypotheses try to explain the very disjunct distribution of remipedes: the vicariance hypothesis suggests that the current remipede populations represent relicts of a global Tethyan distribution during the Mesozoic that was scattered by tectonic movements; the regression hypothesis suggests that global marine populations were scattered by sea regressions, and that they adapted to the remaining environments where they could survive, in this case, anchialine systems; the deep-sea hypothesis considers the possibility that hypogean populations come from deep-sea populations that arrived in cave systems through underwater crevices and fissures. Active or passive migrations of opportunistic organisms is also possible.

=== Behaviour and diet ===
Remipedes swim freely in the water column; their limbs beat continuously, even during the periods of rest. They can either perform horizontal swimming with the ventral side up, though less commonly, horizontal swimming with the dorsal side up is observed when near the bottom of the water or near a rock surface; vertical swimming with the head pointing upward is also seen. Remipedes can feed on living prey such as Artemia brine shrimp, using their powerful cephalic limbs to catch and shake the prey while stabbing it with their venomous maxillules. However, predation does not appear to be the main method of feeding, with filter-feeding being an important part of their diet; the ceaselessly flapping small antennae are probably used to direct small particles toward the mouth. Remipedes were observed grooming themselves with their prehensile cephalic limbs near the bottom of the water in the laboratory.

=== Reproduction and life cycle ===
Remipedes are hermaphrodites; female gonopores are on the protopods of the seventh trunk limbs, while the male gonopores are on the protopods of the fourteenth trunk limbs. Mating behaviour has never been observed.

The female system is organized as follows: two paired ovaries which are fused anteriorly situated between the cephalon and the first trunk somite. From these two ovaries arise two branches (oviducts) running from the second trunk somite to the seventh trunk somite. They transport the oocytes to the gonopores on the protopods.

The male system is organized as follows: the two testes begin in the seventh trunk somite and extend to the tenth trunk somite, they contain various developmental stages of spermatocytes and spermatids. Thin seminal ducts transport spermatids from the tenth trunk somite to the fourteenth trunk somite and the gonopores. Together, few spermatids form larger spermatophores (38 μm in Speleonectes benjamini). Posterior to the gonopore is a genital plate covered with glandular pores that produces a glue-like secretion that might help to fix the spermatophores to external surfaces such as the substrate or other individuals. Sternal bars between the gonopores may help transfer spermatophores to those surfaces.

Nauplii of the species Pleomothra apletocheles has been studied. They are free-living and lecithotrophic (non-feeding). Three development stages have been identified: an orthonauplius stage (reinterpreted as an early metanauplius stage), a metanauplius stage and a pre-juvenile individual.

The orthonauplii are the smallest ones (1550-1660 μm). In the strict sense, they represent early metanauplii because of the presence of at least five post-naupliar segments (body segments that develop after the earliest naupliar stage). They possess uniramous antennules, biramous antennae and mandibles. The segments bear maxillae, maxillules, maxillipeds and two pairs of trunk appendages. The metanauplii are longer (1670-2200 μm) and slimmer. The head and the body begin to be separated. The number of ventral cells is greater than in the previous developmental stage. The brain also begins to be more recognizable. The trunk is more developed, up to nine somites are distinguishable. The only pre-juvenile specimen is 3.75 mm long, overall resembling the adult but with fewer trunk somites, fewer trunk limbs and underdeveloped cephalic limbs. The second branches of the antennae are now developed. The labrum is not fully developed. There are ten pairs of biramous trunk limbs.

As all known larva stages are considered non-feeding, some authors suggested the possibility that symbiotic bacteria might be a nutrient source.

== Systematics ==
Thirty extant species are recognized as of early 2022, divided among eight families and twelve genera. All are placed in the order Nectiopoda. The second order, Enantiopoda, comprises the fossil species Tesnusocaris goldichi and Cryptocaris hootchi.

- †Order Enantiopoda Birshtein 1960
  - †Family Tesnusocarididae Brooks 1955 [Cryptocarididae Sieg 1980]
    - Genus †Tesnusocaris Brooks 1955
      - †Tesnusocaris goldichi Brooks 1955
    - Genus †Cryptocaris Schram 1974
      - †Cryptocaris hootchi Schram 1974
- Order Nectiopoda Schram 1986
  - Family Micropacteridae Koenemann, Iliffe & van der Ham 2007
    - Genus Micropacter Koenemann, Iliffe & van der Ham 2007
      - Micropacter yagerae Koenemann, Iliffe & van der Ham 2007
  - Family Godzilliidae Schram, Yager & Emerson 1986
    - Genus Godzilliognomus Yager 1989
      - Godzilliognomus frondosus Yager, 1989
      - Godzilliognomus schrami Iliffe, Otten & Koenemann 2010
    - Genus Godzillius Schram et al., 1986
      - Godzillius fuchsi Gonzalez, Singpiel & Schlagner 2013
      - Godzillius louriei Ballou, Bracken-Grissom & Olesen, 2021
      - Godzillius robustus Schram, Yager & Emerson 1986
  - Family Kumongidae Hoenemann et al. 2013
    - Genus Kumonga Hoenemann et al. 2013
      - Kumonga exleyi (Yager & Humphreys 1996) Hoenemann et al. 2013 [Lasionectes exleyi Yager & Humphreys 1996]
  - Family Cryptocorynetidae Hoenemann et al. 2013
    - Genus Kaloketos Koenemann, Iliffe & Yager 2004
      - Kaloketos pilosus Koenemann, Iliffe & Yager 2004
    - Genus Angirasu Hoenemann et al. 2013
      - Angirasu benjamini (Yager 1987) Hoenemann et al. 2013 [Speleonectes benjamini Yager 1987]
      - Angirasu parabenjamini (Koenemann, Iliffe & van der Ham 2003) Hoenemann et al. 2013 [Speleonectes parabenjamini Koenemann, Iliffe & van der Ham 2003]
    - Genus Cryptocorynetes Yager 1987
      - Cryptocorynetes elmorei Hazerli, Koenemann & Iliffe 2009
      - Cryptocorynetes haptodiscus Yager 1987
      - Cryptocorynetes longulus Wollermann, Koenemann & Iliffe 2007
  - Family Morlockiidae García-Valdecasas 1984
    - Genus Morlockia García-Valdecasas 1984
      - Morlockia williamsi (Hartke, Koenemann & Yager 2011) [Speleonectes williamsi Hartke, Koenemann & Yager 2011]
      - Morlockia emersoni (Lorentzen, Koenemann & Iliffe 2007) [Speleonectes emersoni Lorentzen, Koenemann & Iliffe 2007]
      - Morlockia atlantida (Koenemann et al. 2009) Hoenemann et al. 2012 [Speleonectes atlantidus Koenemann et al. 2009]
      - Morlockia ondinae García-Valdecasas 1984 [Speleonectes ondinae (Garcia-Valdecasas 1984)]
  - Family Speleonectidae Yager 1981
    - Genus Lasionectes Yager & Schram, 1986
      - Lasionectes entrichoma Yager & Schram, 1986
    - Genus Speleonectes Yager 1981
      - Speleonectes epilimnius Yager & Carpenter, 1999
      - Speleonectes gironensis Yager, 1994
      - Speleonectes kakuki Daenekas et al., 2009
      - Speleonectes lucayensis Yager, 1981
      - Speleonectes minnsi Koenemann, Iliffe & van der Ham, 2003
      - Speleonectes tanumekes Koenemann, Iliffe & van der Ham, 2003
  - Family Xibalbanidae Olesen et al. 2017
    - Genus Xibalbanus Hoenemann et al. 2013
      - Xibalbanus cokei (Yager, 2013) Olesen et al. 2017 [Speleonectes cokei Yager, 2013]
      - Xibalbanus cozumelensis Olesen, Meland, Glenner, van Hengstum & Iliffe, 2017
      - Xibalbanus fuchscockburni (Neiber et al. 2012) Hoenemann et al. 2013 [Speleonectes fuchscockburni Neiber et al. 2012]
      - Xibalbanus tulumensis (Yager 1987) Hoenemann et al. 2013 [Speleonectes tulumensis Yager 1987]
  - Family Pleomothridae Hoenemann et al. 2013
    - Genus Pleomothra Yager 1989
      - Pleomothra apletocheles Yager 1989
      - Pleomothra fragilis Koenemann, Ziegler & Iliffe 2008

=== Fossil record ===
The remipede fossil record is extremely poor: only two species are currently known: Tesnusocaris goldichi from the Tesnus Formation and Cryptocaris hootchi from the Mazon Creek fossil beds, both dating back to the Carboniferous and classified within the family Tesnusocarididae and the order Enantiopoda. They are both very different from the nectiopodans, which has led some authors to question their placement within Remipedia. Among other differences, enantiopodans possess compound eyes and the trunk somites bear two pairs of uniramous appendages (duplopody). It has been suggested that the biramous trunk appendages of numerous arthropods evolved from duplopodous uniramous appendages that fused. No fossil member of Nectiopoda are known.

=== Extant species ===
The first extant species to be described was Speleonectes lucayensis, discovered by Jill Yager while cave diving in Lucayan Caverns on the Grand Bahama Island in 1979 and described in a paper in the Journal of Crustacean Biology in 1981. The novel nature of this species was recognized and the class Remipedia was erected in the same paper. The name "Remipedia" is from the Latin remipedes, meaning "oar-footed".

Historical phylogeny based on morphology and physiology has placed Remipedia under Mandibulata, in the subphylum Crustacea, and distinct from Hexapoda.

New research in evolution and development reveals similarities between larvae and postembryonic development of remipedes and Malacostraca, singling Remipedia as a potential crustacean sister group of Hexapoda. Similarities in brain anatomy further support this affinity, and hexapod-type hemocyanins have been discovered in remipedes.

Recent molecular studies have grouped Remipedia with Cephalocarida, Branchiopoda, and Hexapoda in a clade named Allotriocarida. Remipedia was found as the sister group to Hexapoda both in phylogenomic and combined morphological and transcriptome studies. In other studies Remipedia and Cephalocarida are grouped together form the clade Xenocarida, which in turn was sister to Hexapoda in a clade named Anartiopoda or Miracrustacea ('surprising crustaceans').

The relationship of Remipedia and other crustacean classes and insects is shown in the following phylogenetic tree, which shows Allotriocarida, along with Oligostraca and Multicrustacea, as the three main divisions of subphylum Pancrustacea, embracing the traditional crustaceans and the hexapods (including insects).

- Pancrustacea
  - Oligostraca
  - - Multicrustacea
      - - Thecostraca
        - Copepoda
      - Malacostraca
    - Allotriocarida
      - Cephalocarida
      - - Branchiopoda
        - - Remipedia
          - Hexapoda
            - Protura
            - - - Diplura
                - Collembola
              - Insecta
