= Godzilliognomus =

Scientific classification
- Kingdom: Animalia
- Phylum: Arthropoda
- Class: Remipedia
- Order: Nectiopoda
- Family: Godzilliidae
- Genus: Godzilliognomus; Yager, 1989

Species
- Godzilliognomus frondosus Yager, 1989; Godzilliognomus schrami Iliffe, Otten & Koenemann, 2010

Genus of crustaceans

Godzilliognomus is a genus of remipedes in the family Godzilliidae. Both species were discovered in the Bahamas.
