= Speleonectes minnsi =

Scientific classification
- Kingdom: Animalia
- Phylum: Arthropoda
- Class: Remipedia
- Order: Nectiopoda
- Family: Speleonectidae
- Genus: Speleonectes
- Species: S. minnsi

Binomial name
- Speleonectes minnsi Koenemann, Iliffe & van der Ham, 2003

Species of crustacean

Speleonectes minnsi is a species of remipede in the genus Speleonectes. It was discovered in an anchihaline cave on Great Exuma Island in the central Bahamas.
