= Godzilliognomus schrami =

Scientific classification
- Kingdom: Animalia
- Phylum: Arthropoda
- Class: Remipedia
- Order: Nectiopoda
- Family: Godzilliidae
- Genus: Godzilliognomus
- Species: G. schrami

Binomial name
- Godzilliognomus schrami Iliffe, Otten & Koenemann, 2010

Species of crustacean

Godzilliognomus schrami is a species of remipede described in 2010, representing one of five extant species of the family Godzilliidae. It generally reaches about 7 millimetres (0.28 in) in length and inhabits a single anchialine cave on Eleuthera Island. The specific epithet commemorates Frederick Schram.
