= Godzilliognomus frondosus =

Scientific classification
- Kingdom: Animalia
- Phylum: Arthropoda
- Class: Remipedia
- Order: Nectiopoda
- Family: Godzilliidae
- Genus: Godzilliognomus
- Species: G. frondosus

Binomial name
- Godzilliognomus frondosus Yager, 1989

Species of crustacean

Godzilliognomus frondosus is a species of remipede in the genus Godzilliognomus. It was discovered in the Bahamas, alongside Pleomothra apletocheles.
