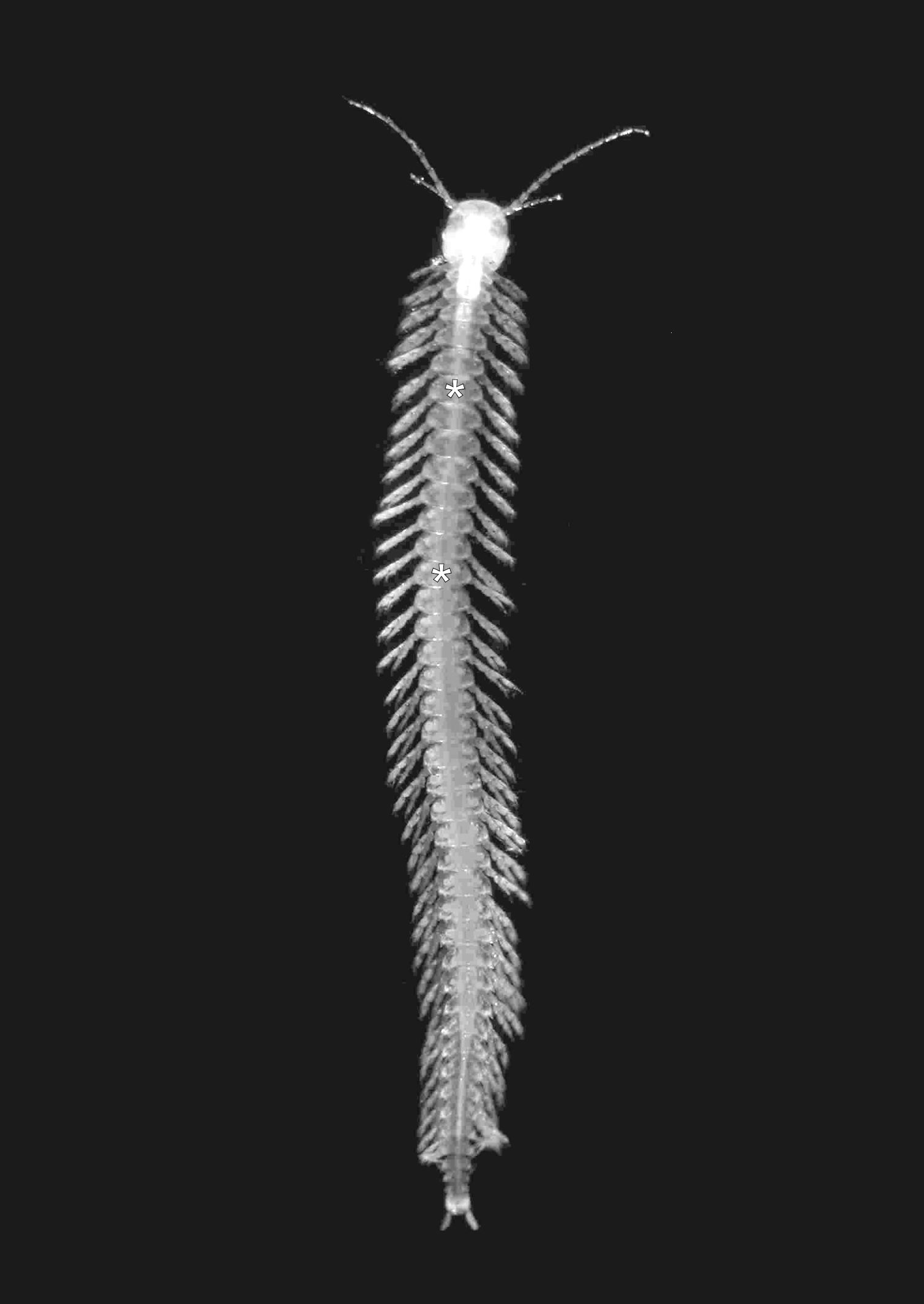

Scientific classification
- Kingdom: Animalia
- Phylum: Arthropoda
- Class: Remipedia
- Order: Nectiopoda
- Family: Speleonectidae
- Genus: Speleonectes
- Species: S. tanumekes

Binomial name
- Speleonectes tanumekes Koenemann, Iliffe & van der Ham, 2003

= Speleonectes tanumekes =

Species of crustacean

Speleonectes tanumekes is a species of remipede in the genus Speleonectes. It was discovered in an anchihaline cave on Great Exuma Island in the central Bahamas.
