= Speleonectes epilimnius =

Scientific classification
- Kingdom: Animalia
- Phylum: Arthropoda
- Class: Remipedia
- Order: Nectiopoda
- Family: Speleonectidae
- Genus: Speleonectes
- Species: S. epilimnius

Binomial name
- Speleonectes epilimnius Yager & Carpenter, 1999

Species of crustacean

Speleonectes epilimnius is a species of remipede in the genus Speleonectes. It was discovered in an anchihaline cave on San Salvador Island in the Bahamas.
