= Godzillius fuchsi =

Scientific classification
- Kingdom: Animalia
- Phylum: Arthropoda
- Class: Remipedia
- Order: Nectiopoda
- Family: Godzilliidae
- Genus: Godzillius
- Species: G. fuchsi

Binomial name
- Godzillius fuchsi Gonzalez, Singpiel & Schlagner, 2013

Species of crustacean

Godzillius fuchsi is a species of remipede in the genus Godzillius. It was discovered in two anchialine blue holes on Abaco Island in the Bahamas.
