= Speleonectes gironensis =

Scientific classification
- Kingdom: Animalia
- Phylum: Arthropoda
- Class: Remipedia
- Order: Nectiopoda
- Family: Speleonectidae
- Genus: Speleonectes
- Species: S. gironensis

Binomial name
- Speleonectes gironensis Yager, 1994

Species of crustacean

Speleonectes gironensis is a species of remipede in the genus Speleonectes. It was discovered in anchialine caves in Cuba.
