= Morlockia atlantida =

Scientific classification
- Domain: Eukaryota
- Kingdom: Animalia
- Phylum: Arthropoda
- Class: Remipedia
- Order: Nectiopoda
- Family: Morlockiidae
- Genus: Morlockia
- Species: M. atlantida

Binomial name
- Morlockia atlantida (Koenemann et al., 2009)

Species of crustacean

Morlockia atlantida is a species of eyeless crustacean in the order Nectiopoda. It was discovered in August 2009 in the Túnel de la Atlántida, the world's longest submarine lava tube on Lanzarote in the Canary Islands off the west coast of North Africa. Originally named Speleonectes atlantida, it was transferred to genus Morlockia in 2012. Like other remipedes, the species is equipped with venomous fangs.

== Description ==
Morlockia atlantida is approximately 20 millimetres (0.8 in) long. Like most other remipedes, the species lacks eyes and is hermaphroditic. Adapted to life in caves, the long antennae sprouting from its head and the presence of sensory hairs along its body allow the crustacean to feel its way along the dark tunnel.

The species is equipped with venom-injecting fangs, a feature unique to class Remipedia among crustaceans.

== Discovery ==
During a cave diving expedition to explore the Túnel de la Atlántida, the world's longest known submarine lava tube on Lanzarote in the Canary Islands, an international team of scientists and cave divers discovered the previously unknown species of remipede crustacean, along with two new species of annelid worms of the class Polychaeta. The new species was originally placed in genus Speleonectes and family Speleonectidae, but was later transferred to genus Morlockia in family Morlockiidae. The species was named after the tunnel it was found in. It is morphologically very similar to Morlockia ondinae, a remipede that has been known from the same lava tube since 1985, but DNA comparison studies proved that it is a second species. The divergence of the two species may have occurred after the formation of the 6 km (3.7 mi) lava tube during an eruption of the Monte Corona volcano some 20,000 years ago.
