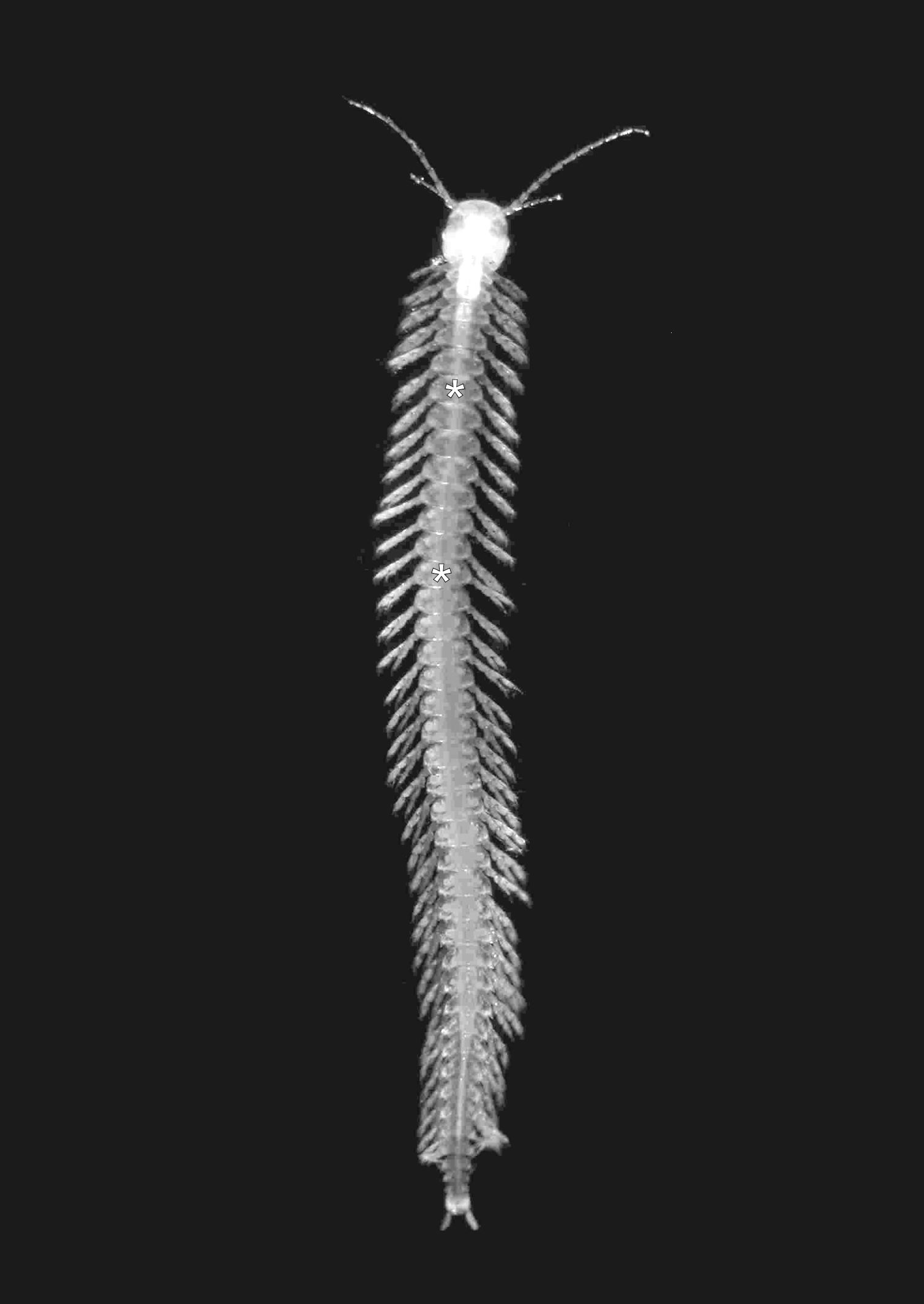
- Speleonectes tanumekes (Speleonectidae)

Scientific classification
- Kingdom: Animalia
- Phylum: Arthropoda
- Class: Remipedia
- Order: Nectiopoda; Schram, 1986

Families
- See text

= Nectiopoda =

Order of crustaceans

Nectiopoda is one of the two orders of remipedes (members of the class Remipedia), the other being the extinct, monotypic order Enantiopoda.

== Classification ==
- Order Nectiopoda Schram 1986
  - Family Micropacteridae Koenemann, Iliffe & van der Ham 2007
    - Genus Micropacter Koenemann, Iliffe & van der Ham 2007
      - Micropacter yagerae Koenemann, Iliffe & van der Ham 2007
  - Family Godzilliidae Schram, Yager & Emerson 1986
    - Genus Godzilliognomus Yager 1989
      - Godzilliognomus frondosus Yager, 1989
      - Godzilliognomus schrami Iliffe, Otten & Koenemann 2010
    - Genus Godzillius Schram et al., 1986
      - Godzillius fuchsi Gonzalez, Singpiel & Schlagner 2013
      - Godzillius louriei Ballou, Bracken-Grissom & Olesen, 2021
      - Godzillius robustus Schram, Yager & Emerson 1986
  - Family Kumongidae Hoenemann et al. 2013
    - Genus Kumonga Hoenemann et al. 2013
      - Kumonga exleyi (Yager & Humphreys 1996) Hoenemann et al. 2013 [Lasionectes exleyi Yager & Humphreys 1996]
  - Family Cryptocorynetidae Hoenemann et al. 2013
    - Genus Kaloketos Koenemann, Iliffe & Yager 2004
      - Kaloketos pilosus Koenemann, Iliffe & Yager 2004
    - Genus Angirasu Hoenemann et al. 2013
      - Angirasu benjamini (Yager 1987) Hoenemann et al. 2013 [Speleonectes benjamini Yager 1987]
      - Angirasu parabenjamini (Koenemann, Iliffe & van der Ham 2003) Hoenemann et al. 2013 [Speleonectes parabenjamini Koenemann, Iliffe & van der Ham 2003]
    - Genus Cryptocorynetes Yager 1987
      - Cryptocorynetes elmorei Hazerli, Koenemann & Iliffe 2009
      - Cryptocorynetes haptodiscus Yager 1987
      - Cryptocorynetes longulus Wollermann, Koenemann & Iliffe 2007
  - Family Morlockiidae García-Valdecasas 1984
    - Genus Morlockia García-Valdecasas 1984
      - Morlockia williamsi (Hartke, Koenemann & Yager 2011) [Speleonectes williamsi Hartke, Koenemann & Yager 2011]
      - Morlockia emersoni (Lorentzen, Koenemann & Iliffe 2007) [Speleonectes emersoni Lorentzen, Koenemann & Iliffe 2007]
      - Morlockia atlantida (Koenemann et al. 2009) Hoenemann et al. 2012 [Speleonectes atlantidus Koenemann et al. 2009]
      - Morlockia ondinae García-Valdecasas 1984 [Speleonectes ondinae (Garcia-Valdecasas 1984)]
  - Family Speleonectidae Yager 1981
    - Genus Lasionectes Yager & Schram, 1986
      - Lasionectes entrichoma Yager & Schram, 1986
    - Genus Speleonectes Yager 1981
      - Speleonectes epilimnius Yager & Carpenter, 1999
      - Speleonectes gironensis Yager, 1994
      - Speleonectes kakuki Daenekas et al., 2009
      - Speleonectes lucayensis Yager, 1981
      - Speleonectes minnsi Koenemann, Iliffe & van der Ham, 2003
      - Speleonectes tanumekes Koenemann, Iliffe & van der Ham, 2003
  - Family Xibalbanidae Olesen et al. 2017
    - Genus Xibalbanus Hoenemann et al. 2013
      - Xibalbanus cokei (Yager, 2013) Olesen et al. 2017 [Speleonectes cokei Yager, 2013]
      - Xibalbanus cozumelensis Olesen, Meland, Glenner, van Hengstum & Iliffe, 2017
      - Xibalbanus fuchscockburni (Neiber et al. 2012) Hoenemann et al. 2013 [Speleonectes fuchscockburni Neiber et al. 2012]
      - Xibalbanus tulumensis (Yager 1987) Hoenemann et al. 2013 [Speleonectes tulumensis Yager 1987]
  - Family Pleomothridae Hoenemann et al. 2013
    - Genus Pleomothra Yager 1989
      - Pleomothra apletocheles Yager 1989
      - Pleomothra fragilis Koenemann, Ziegler & Iliffe 2008
