= Morlockia =

Scientific classification
- Domain: Eukaryota
- Kingdom: Animalia
- Phylum: Arthropoda
- Class: Remipedia
- Order: Nectiopoda
- Family: Morlockiidae
- Genus: Morlockia; García-Valdecasas, 1985

Species of crustacean

Morlockia is a genus of eyeless crustaceans in the family Morlockiidae. The genus contains 4 described species.

== Etymology ==
The names Morlockia and Morlockiidae come from the Morlocks, a fictional species made by H. G. Wells in his 1895 novel The Time Machine, because of the genera's adaptation to low-light conditions, like the Morlocks.

== Species ==
Morlockia contains 4 accepted species:

- Morlockia atlantida (Koenemann et al., 2009)
- Morlockia emersoni (Lorentzen, Koenemann, Iliffe, 2007)
- Morlockia ondinae (García-Valdecasas, 1985)
- Morlockia williamsi (Hartke, Koenemann & Yager, 2011)
