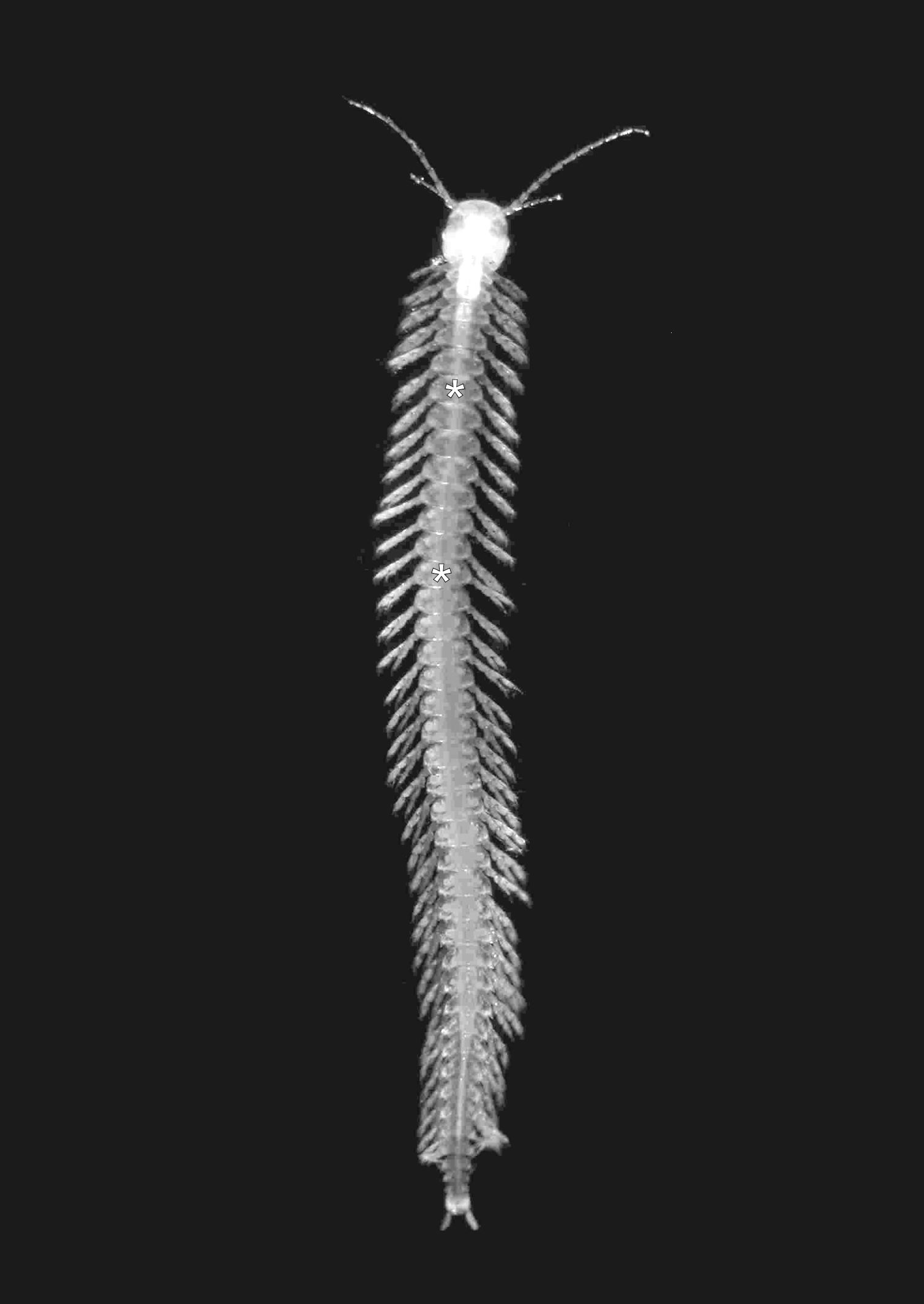
- Speleonectes tanumekes

Scientific classification
- Kingdom: Animalia
- Phylum: Arthropoda
- Class: Remipedia
- Order: Nectiopoda
- Family: Speleonectidae; Yager, 1981

= Speleonectidae =

Family of crustaceans

Speleonectidae is a family of remipedes in the order Nectiopoda. There are at least two genera and about seven described species in Speleonectidae.

== Genera ==
These two genera and seven species belong to the family Speleonectidae:

- Lasionectes Yager & Schram, 1986
  - Lasionectes entrichoma Yager & Schram, 1986
- Speleonectes Yager, 1981
  - Speleonectes epilimnius Yager & Carpenter, 1999
  - Speleonectes gironensis Yager, 1994
  - Speleonectes kakuki Daenekas, Iliffe, Yager & Koenemann, 2009
  - Speleonectes lucayensis Yager, 1981
  - Speleonectes minnsi Koenemann, Iliffe & van der Ham, 2003
  - Speleonectes tanumekes Koenemann, Iliffe & van der Ham, 2003

Several former Speleonectes species have recently been transferred to other genera. Three examples of such species include:

- Speleonectes atlantida (to Morlockia atlantida)
- Speleonectes benjamini (to Angirasu benjamini)
- Speleonectes tulumensis (to Xibalbanus tulumensis)
