= Speleonectes lucayensis =

Scientific classification
- Kingdom: Animalia
- Phylum: Arthropoda
- Class: Remipedia
- Order: Nectiopoda
- Family: Speleonectidae
- Genus: Speleonectes
- Species: S. lucayensis

Binomial name
- Speleonectes lucayensis Yager, 1981

Species of crustacean

Speleonectes lucayensis is a species of remipede in the genus Speleonectes. It was the first remipede to be described, having been discovered by Jill Yager in the Lucayan Caverns on Grand Bahama while cave diving in 1979.
