= Angirasu (crustacean) =

Scientific classification
- Kingdom: Animalia
- Phylum: Arthropoda
- Clade: Pancrustacea
- Class: Remipedia
- Order: Nectiopoda
- Family: Cryptocorynetidae
- Genus: Angirasu; Hoenemann, Neiber, Schram & Koenemann in Hoenemann, Neiber, Humphreys, Iliffe, Li, Schram & Koenemann, 2013

Genus of crustaceans

Angirasu is a genus of the class Remipedia described in 2013.
