= Pleomothra apletocheles =

Scientific classification
- Kingdom: Animalia
- Phylum: Arthropoda
- Class: Remipedia
- Order: Nectiopoda
- Family: Pleomothridae
- Genus: Pleomothra
- Species: P. apletocheles

Binomial name
- Pleomothra apletocheles Yager, 1989

Species of crustacean

Pleomothra apletocheles is a species of remipede in the genus Pleomothra, of which it is also the type species. It was discovered in the Bahamas, alongside Godzilliognomus frondosus.
