= Pleomothra fragilis =

Scientific classification
- Kingdom: Animalia
- Phylum: Arthropoda
- Class: Remipedia
- Order: Nectiopoda
- Family: Pleomothridae
- Genus: Pleomothra
- Species: P. fragilis

Binomial name
- Pleomothra fragilis Koenemann, Ziegler & Iliffe, 2008

Species of crustacean

Pleomothra fragilis is a species of remipede in the genus Pleomothra. It was discovered in an anchialine cave in the Exuma Cays of the Bahamas.
