= Speleonectes kakuki =

Scientific classification
- Kingdom: Animalia
- Phylum: Arthropoda
- Class: Remipedia
- Order: Nectiopoda
- Family: Speleonectidae
- Genus: Speleonectes
- Species: S. kakuki

Binomial name
- Speleonectes kakuki Daenekas, Iliffe, Yager & Koenemann, 2009

Species of crustacean

Speleonectes kakuki is a species of remipede in the genus Speleonectes. It was discovered in anchihaline and sub-seafloor caves on Andros and Cat Island, Bahamas in 2004, and was then described in 2009.
