= Godzillius robustus =

Scientific classification
- Kingdom: Animalia
- Phylum: Arthropoda
- Class: Remipedia
- Order: Nectiopoda
- Family: Godzilliidae
- Genus: Godzillius
- Species: G. robustus

Binomial name
- Godzillius robustus Schram, Yager & Emerson, 1986

Species of crustacean

Godzillius robustus is a species of remipede in the genus Godzillius. The holotype and paratype were discovered at the Turks And Caicos Islands. At up to 4.5 cm (1.8 in), G. robustus is the largest remipede in the world.
