= Kumonga exleyi =

Cape Range remipede

Conservation status
- Vulnerable (EPBC Act)
- Critically Endangered (Biodiversity Conservation Act 2016 (WA))

Scientific classification
- Kingdom: Animalia
- Phylum: Arthropoda
- Class: Remipedia
- Order: Nectiopoda
- Family: Kumongidae; Hoenemann et al., 2013
- Genus: Kumonga; Hoenemann et al., 2013
- Species: K. exleyi

Binomial name
- Kumonga exleyi (Yager & Humphreys, 1996)

Synonyms
- Lasionectes exleyi Yager & Humphreys, 1996

Species of crustacean

Kumonga exleyi, also known as the Cape Range remipede, is a species of remipede in the monospecific genus Kumonga and the monotypic family Kumongidae. It was described in 1996 from specimens collected during the years of 1993 to 1995, and was originally assigned to the genus Lasionectes, but was moved to its own genus, Kumonga, in 2013. It is listed as a vulnerable species under the Environment Protection and Biodiversity Conservation Act 1999 and as a critically endangered species under the Biodiversity Conservation Act 2016 (WA).

It is named after Kumonga, a kaiju from the 1967 kaiju film Son of Godzilla and the cave diver Sheck Exley.
