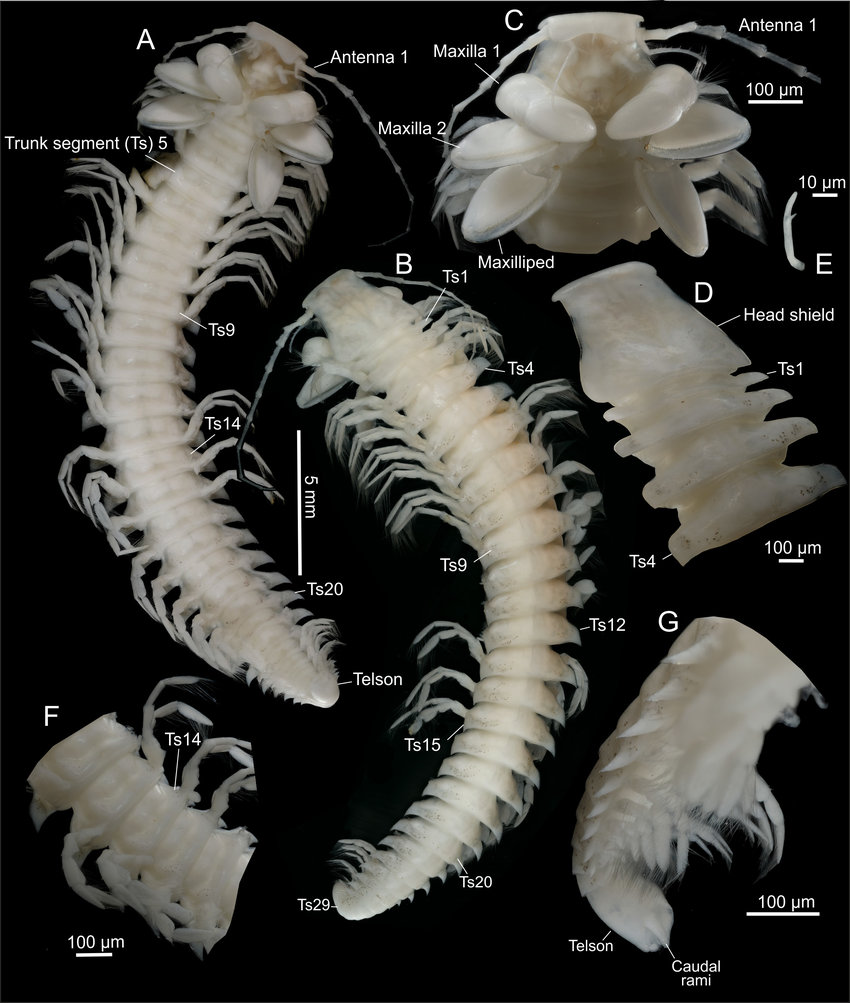
- Godzillius louriei

Scientific classification
- Kingdom: Animalia
- Phylum: Arthropoda
- Class: Remipedia
- Order: Nectiopoda
- Family: Godzilliidae
- Genus: Godzillius; Schram, Yager & Emerson, 1986

Type species
- Godzillius robustus Schram, Yager & Emerson, 1986

Other species
- Godzillius fuchsi Gonzalez, Singpiel & Schlagner, 2013; Godzillius louriei Ballou, Bracken-Grissom & Olesen, 2021

= Godzillius =

Genus of crustaceans

Godzillius is a genus of remipedes in the family Godzilliidae. It contains the largest species of remipede in the world, Godzillius robustus, which grows to 4.5 cm (1.8 in).

It is named after Godzilla, referencing the large size of Godzillius adults.
