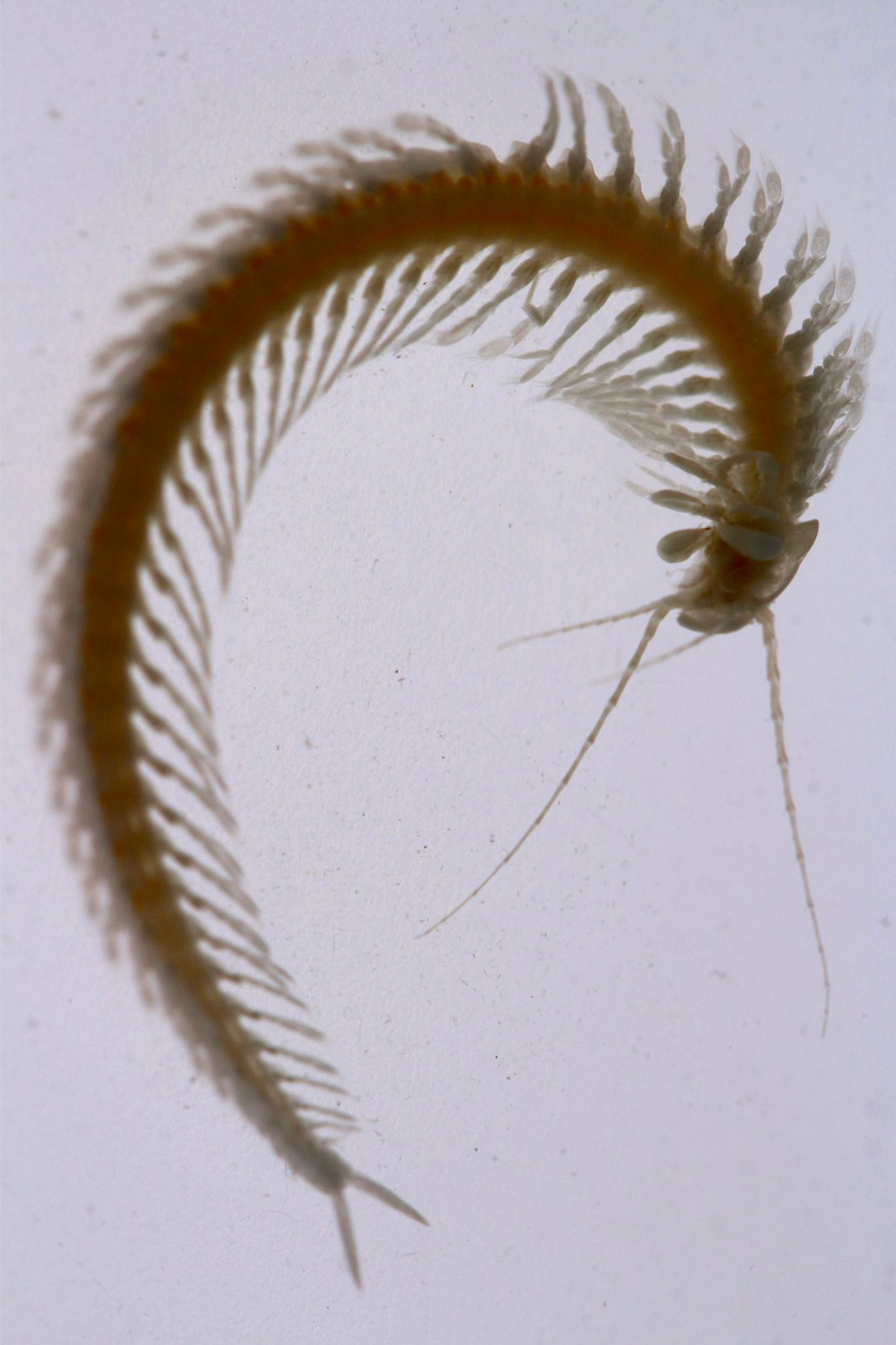

Scientific classification
- Kingdom: Animalia
- Phylum: Arthropoda
- Class: Remipedia
- Order: Nectiopoda
- Family: Xibalbanidae
- Genus: Xibalbanus
- Species: X. tulumensis

Binomial name
- Xibalbanus tulumensis (Yager, 1987)

Synonyms
- Speleonectes tulumensis Yager, 1987

= Xibalbanus tulumensis =

Species of crustacean

Xibalbanus tulumensis (previously Speleonectes tulumensis – Speleonectes = 'cave swimmer'; tulumensis = 'occurring at Tulum' – Xibalbanus = 'from Xibalba') is a venomous, hermaphroditic crustacean found in anchialine caves on the Yucatán Peninsula in the Caribbean Sea. This blind remipede liquefies the body contents of other crustaceans with a venom similar to that of rattlesnakes, and which includes digestive enzymes and a paralysing toxin.

In her 1987 description, Smithsonian biologist Jill Yager wrote 'Body elongate, slender, without eyes or pigment. Cephalic shield small, tapering slightly at anterior end. Trunk segment numbers increasing with age, maximum number examined was 36 segments'. The numerous legs are used as oars for swimming. The species is 25–30 millimetres (1.0–1.2 in) long, and found in cenotes close to the sea, with salty seawater lying beneath the fresh water, and grading smoothly from one type to the other (halocline).

Stygobites are organisms found in subterranean groundwater habitats or anchialine caves, and characterised morphologically by loss or extreme reduction of eyes and pigment, frequently with attenuated bodies or appendages. The evolution of this body shape is known as troglomorphy. X. tulumensis is one of 24 species in the class Remipedia, all of which are stygobitic, and distributed throughout the Caribbean, the Canary Islands, and Western Australia. They are free-swimming crustaceans, typically living in low-oxygen, brackish waters of near-marine caves, and their distribution is linked to the ancient Tethys Sea.

The feeding technique of X. tulumensis is unique among crustaceans, and its venom is a useful adaptation that to some extent compensates for being sightless in a nutrient-poor or oligotrophic environment. Venom is common in all the arthropod subphyla, but was believed to be completely absent from the approximately 70,000 known species of crustacean until the discovery of X. tulumensis. In 2007, researchers noticed that the species' front claws resembled hypodermic needles, leading to speculation that their purpose might be to inject toxins into their prey. Venom-filled reservoirs have since been found attached to the needles, packed in muscles that can force out the venom. Glands in the centre of the body produce the venom and connect to the reservoirs. It is suspected that all remipede species have some type of poison apparatus since all have fangs on the first maxilla.
