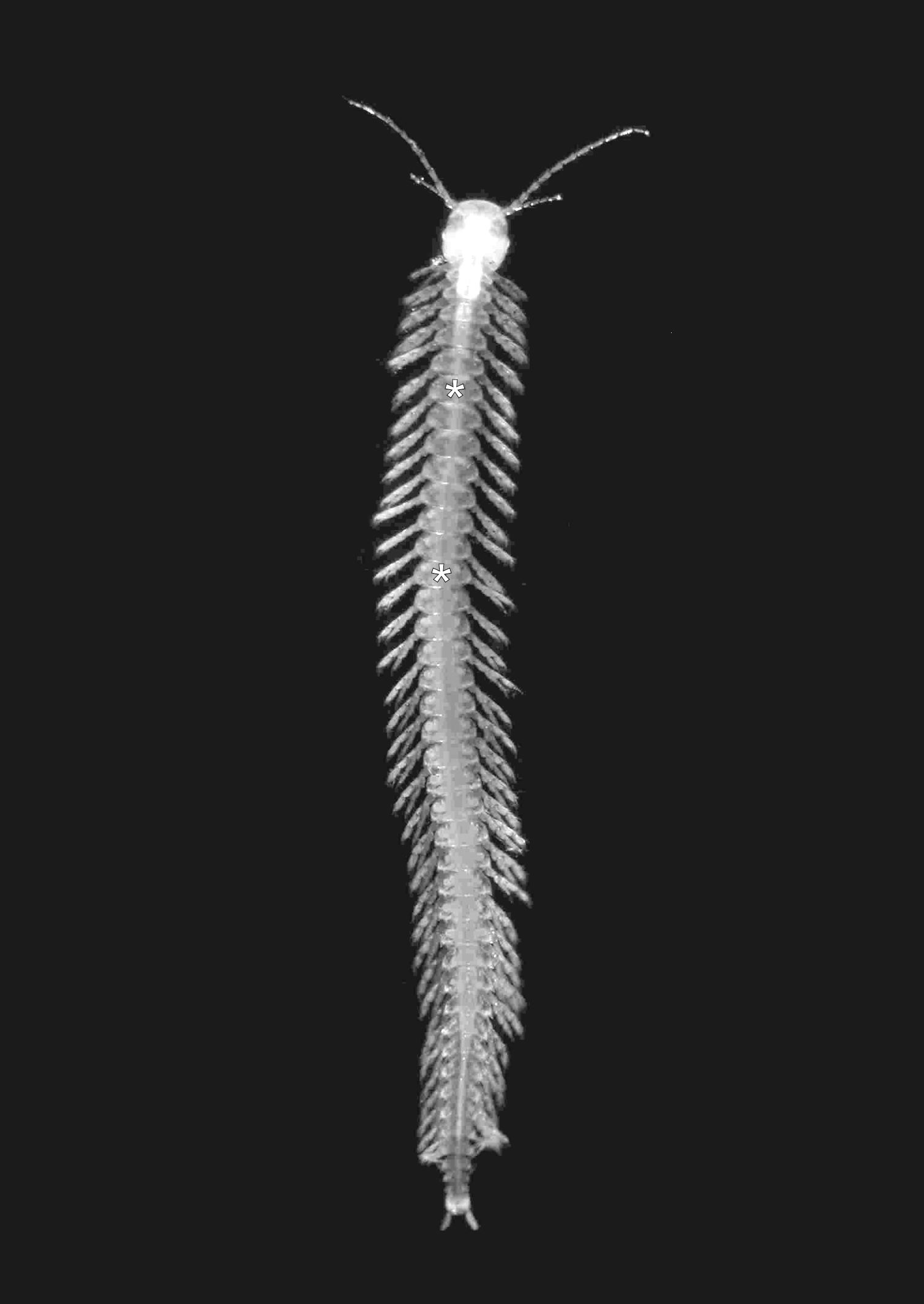
- Speleonectes tanumekes

Scientific classification
- Kingdom: Animalia
- Phylum: Arthropoda
- Class: Remipedia
- Order: Nectiopoda
- Family: Speleonectidae
- Genus: Speleonectes; Yager, 1981

Type species
- Speleonectes lucayensis Yager, 1981

Species
- See text

= Speleonectes =

Genus of crustaceans

Speleonectes is a genus of remipedes in the family Speleonectidae. It was the first genus of remipedes to be described, with the type species, Speleonectes lucayensis, having been discovered by Jill Yager in the Lucayan Caverns on Grand Bahama while cave diving in 1979.

== Species ==
=== Accepted species ===
- Speleonectes epilimnius Yager & Carpenter, 1999
- Speleonectes gironensis Yager, 1994
- Speleonectes kakuki Daenekas, Iliffe, Yager & Koenemann, 2009
- Speleonectes lucayensis Yager, 1981
- Speleonectes minnsi Koenemann, Iliffe & van der Ham, 2003
- Speleonectes tanumekes Koenemann, Iliffe & van der Ham, 2003

=== Unaccepted species ===
- Speleonectes atlantida Koenemann, Bloechl, Martínez, Iliffe, Hoenemann & Oromí, 2009
- Speleonectes benjamini Yager, 1987
- Speleonectes cokei Yager, 2013
- Speleonectes emersoni Lorentzen, Koenemann & Iliffe, 2007
- Speleonectes fuchscockburni Neiber, Hansen, Iliffe, Gonzalez & Koenemann, 2012
- Speleonectes ondinae (García-Valdecasas, 1985)
- Speleonectes parabenjamini Koenemann, Iliffe & van der Ham, 2003
- Speleonectes tulumensis Yager, 1987
- Speleonectes williamsi Hartke, Koenemann & Yager, 2011
