= Lasionectes =

Scientific classification
- Kingdom: Animalia
- Phylum: Arthropoda
- Class: Remipedia
- Order: Nectiopoda
- Family: Speleonectidae
- Genus: Lasionectes; Yager & Schram, 1986
- Species: L. entrichoma

Binomial name
- Lasionectes entrichoma Yager & Schram, 1986

Monospecific genus of crustaceans

Lasionectes is a monospecific genus of remipedes in the family Speleonectidae. It is one of two genera in the family, the other being Speleonectes, which was the first genus of remipedes to be described.

The type and only accepted species is Lasionectes entrichoma. A second species, Lasionectes exleyi, was previously assigned to this genus, but has since been moved to its own genus, Kumonga.
