= Morlockiidae =

Scientific classification
- Domain: Eukaryota
- Kingdom: Animalia
- Phylum: Arthropoda
- Class: Remipedia
- Order: Nectiopoda
- Family: Morlockiidae; García-Valdecasas, 1984

Family of crustaceans

Morlockiidae is a family of eyeless crustaceans in the order Remipedia. It contains one genus, Morlockia, which has 4 described species. The family was first described by Antonio García Valdecasas in 1984, during an expedition at the Jameos del Agua.

== Genera ==
Morlockiidae only contains one genus, Morlockia.
