= Lucayan National Park =

National park in the Bahamas

- IUCN category II (national park)
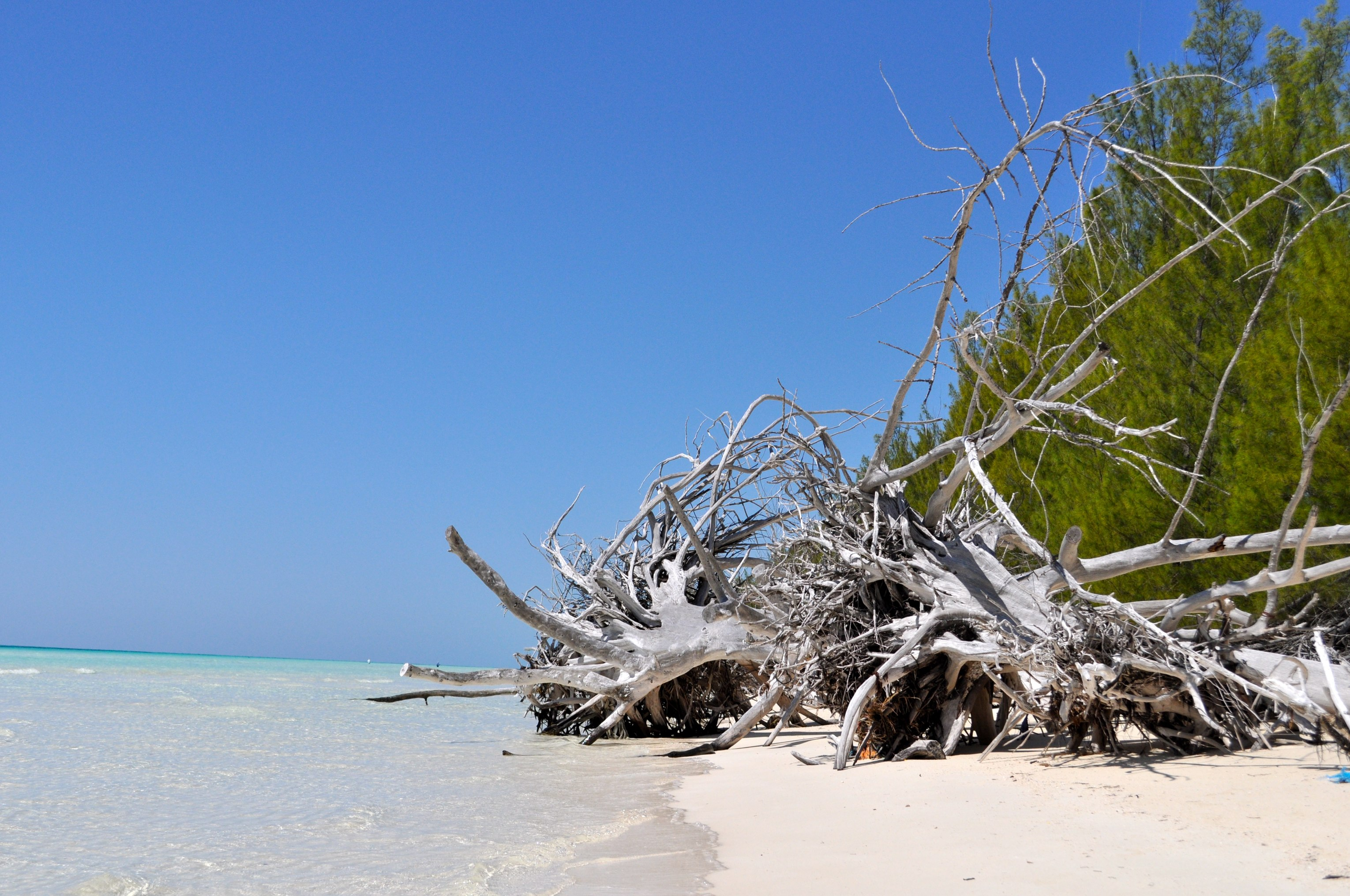

- Location within Bahamas
- Location: Grand Bahama, the Bahamas
- Nearest city: Freeport
- Coordinates: 26.6035°N 78.4017°W
- Area: 40 acres (16 ha) (land); 1,937 acres (7.84 km^{2}) (total)
- Established: March 1982
- Governing body: Bahamas National Trust
- Website: bnt.bs/lucayan-national-park/

Lucayan National Park is a national park in Grand Bahama, the Bahamas. The park was established in 1982 and has a land area of 40 acres (16 ha), and 1,937 acres (7.84 km^{2}) in total. The park contains an underwater cave system with 6.4 mi (10.3 km) of charted tunnels.

== Flora and fauna ==
Prior to the creation of the park, the area was the site of the discovery of the Remipedia class of crustaceans, in 1979. The park is also an Important Bird Area, providing habitat for the thick-billed vireo, Bahama swallow and the olive-capped warbler, among others.

== See also ==
- Cave diving regions of the world: Bahamas
