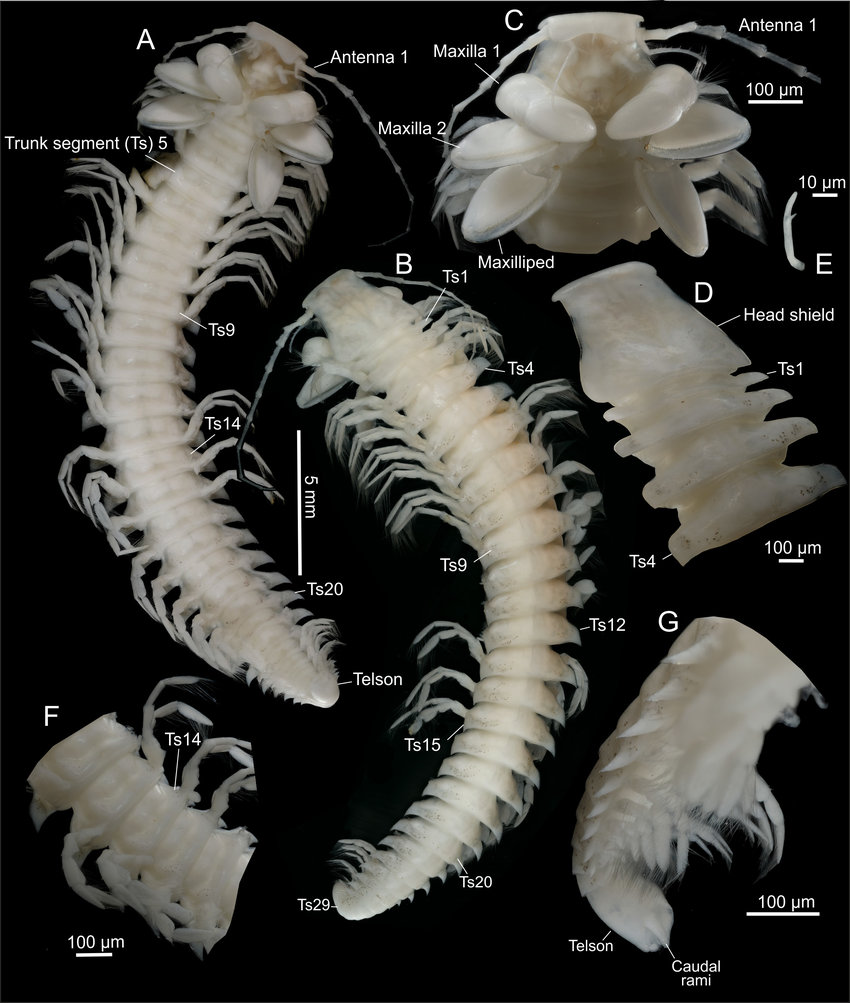
- Godzillius louriei

Scientific classification
- Kingdom: Animalia
- Phylum: Arthropoda
- Clade: Pancrustacea
- Class: Remipedia
- Order: Nectiopoda
- Family: Godzilliidae; Schram, Yager & Emerson, 1986

= Godzilliidae =

Family of crustaceans

Godzilliidae is a family of remipedes in the order Nectiopoda. There are at least two genera and four described species in Godzilliidae. The family is named after the Japanese movie monster Godzilla.

== Genera ==
These two genera belong to the family Godzilliidae:

- Godzilliognomus Yager, 1989
- Godzillius Schram, Yager & Emerson, 1986
