= Jill Yager =

American zoologist

Jill Yager is an American zoologist and cave diver. Yager's research is centered on the conservation of inland caves. She discovered a venomous crustacean species, and she also named its class. Yager was named Cave Scientist of the Year in 2000 and was inducted into the Women Divers Hall of Fame in 2000.

== Education ==
Yager received her bachelor's degree from Colorado State University, her Master's of Science degree from the Florida Institute of Technology, and her Ph.D. from Old Dominion University.

== Career ==
After reading Kon Tiki and Lady with a Spear, Yager became interested in exploring underwater. Jacques Cousteau, who raised public awareness about the ocean, had an impact on her. She was inspired by Jane Goodall, whom she regards as "a true hero". Yager's research is centered on the conservation of inland caves, emphasizing that activities occurring above the caves, such as deforestation and pollution, can influence the caves themselves. She started her research in the mid-1970s while residing in the Bahamas. She began cave diving there while working as a high-school biology teacher.

In 1979, Yager discovered the venomous crustacean species Speleonectes lucayensis and she also named its class as Remipedia. Remipedia means "oar-footed". The crustaceans resemble centipedes. The class was originally known from the fossil species Tesnusocaris goldichi and Cryptocaris hootchi, but they were not added to Remipedia until 1991. Yager found the crustaceans in an underwater cave that is connected to Grand Bahama, known as the Lucayan Cavern. Yager's discovery of the new crustacean appeared as part of David McCullough's third segment of the Smithsonian World television special "Where None Has Gone Before". She participated in a Japanese documentary filmed in Mexico and worked on several specials for PBS. During her trip to Cuba in August 1999, Yager recorded a National Geographic television series titled Sea Stories.

Yager is a research associate at the National Museum of Natural History and a Fellow of the National Speleological Society. At Antioch College, Yager was the professor of zoology, ecology and environmental sciences from September 1989 to June 2007.

== Awards and recognition ==
Yager was named Cave Scientist of the Year in 2000, and was inducted into the Women Divers Hall of Fame in 2000. She received the Karst Waters Institute Award in 2000.

In 1988, the cave shrimp species Yagerocaris cozumel was named after Yager.
