= Anchialine system =

Landlocked body of water with underground connection to the sea

An anchialine system (/ˈæŋkiəlaɪn/, from Greek ankhialos 'near the sea') is a landlocked body of water with a subterranean connection to the ocean. Depending on its formation, these systems can exist in one of two primary forms: pools or caves. The primary differentiating characteristics between pools and caves is the availability of light; cave systems are generally aphotic while pools are euphotic. The difference in light availability has a large influence on the biology of a given system. Anchialine systems are a feature of coastal aquifers which are density stratified, with water near the surface being fresh or brackish, and saline water intruding from the coast at depth. Depending on the site, it is sometimes possible to access the deeper saline water directly in the anchialine pool, or sometimes it may be accessible by cave diving.

Anchialine systems are extremely common worldwide especially along neotropical coastlines where the geology and aquifer systems are relatively young, and there is minimal soil development. Such conditions occur notably where the bedrock is limestone or recently formed volcanic lava. Many anchialine systems are found on the coastlines of the island of Hawaii, the Yucatán Peninsula, South Australia, the Canary Islands, Christmas Island, and other karst and volcanic systems.

== Geology ==
=== Karst landscape formation ===
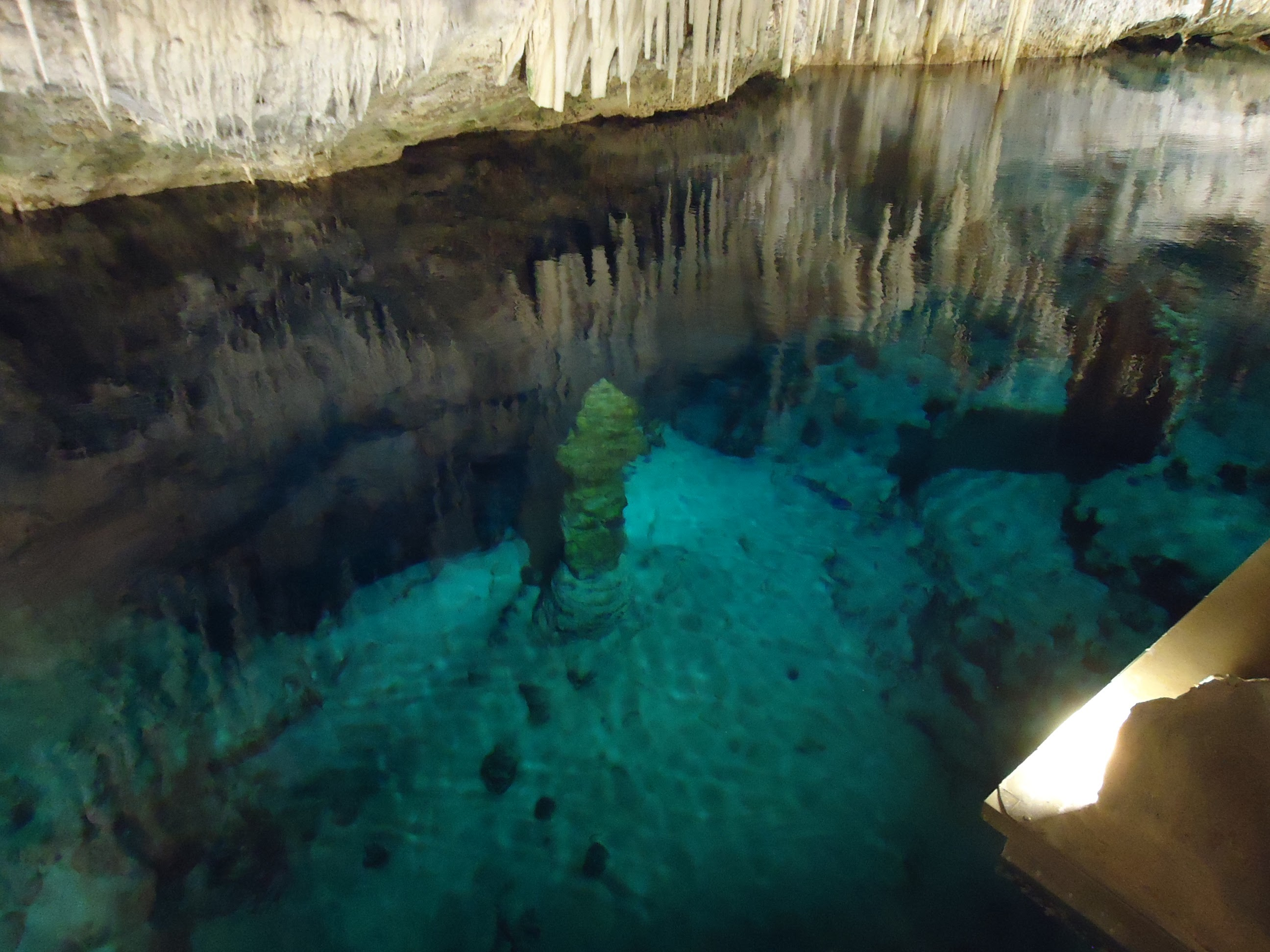
Crystal Cave, Bermuda is an anchialine cave formed by chemical dissolution of soluble bedrock.

Anchialine systems may occur in karst landscapes, regions with bedrock composed of soluble sedimentary rock, such as limestone, dolomite, marble, gypsum, or halite. Subterranean voids form in karst landscapes through the dissolution of bedrock by rainwater, which becomes mildly acidic by equilibrating with carbon dioxide from the atmosphere and soil as it percolates, resulting in carbonic acid, a weak acid. The acidic water reacts with the soluble sedimentary rock causing the rock to dissolve and create voids. Over time, these voids widen and deepen, resulting in caves, sinkholes, subterranean pools, and springs. The processes to form these karst morphological features occur on long geological timescales; caverns can be several hundred thousand to millions of years old. Since the caverns which house karst anchialine systems form through the dissolution of bedrock via water percolation, current karst anchialine systems developed around the last glacial maximum, approximately 20,000 years ago when the sea level was ~120 meters lower than today. Evidence of this can be seen in speleothems (stalactites and stalagmites), a terrestrial cave formation observed at 24 meters water depth in anchialine pools in Bermuda and 122 meters water depth in a blue hole in Belize. The marine transgression after the last glacial maximum caused saline groundwater to intrude into karst caverns resulting in anchialine systems. In some anchialine systems, lenses of freshwater overlay the saltwater environment. This is caused by the accumulation of freshwater from meteoric or phreatic sources above the intruded saltwater or the vertical displacement of freshwater from intruding saltwater. Horizontal white "bathtub ring" stains are observed in submerged sections of Green Bay Cave, Bermuda, indicating paleo-transition zones between freshwater and saltwater at a lower sea level.

=== Volcanic formation ===
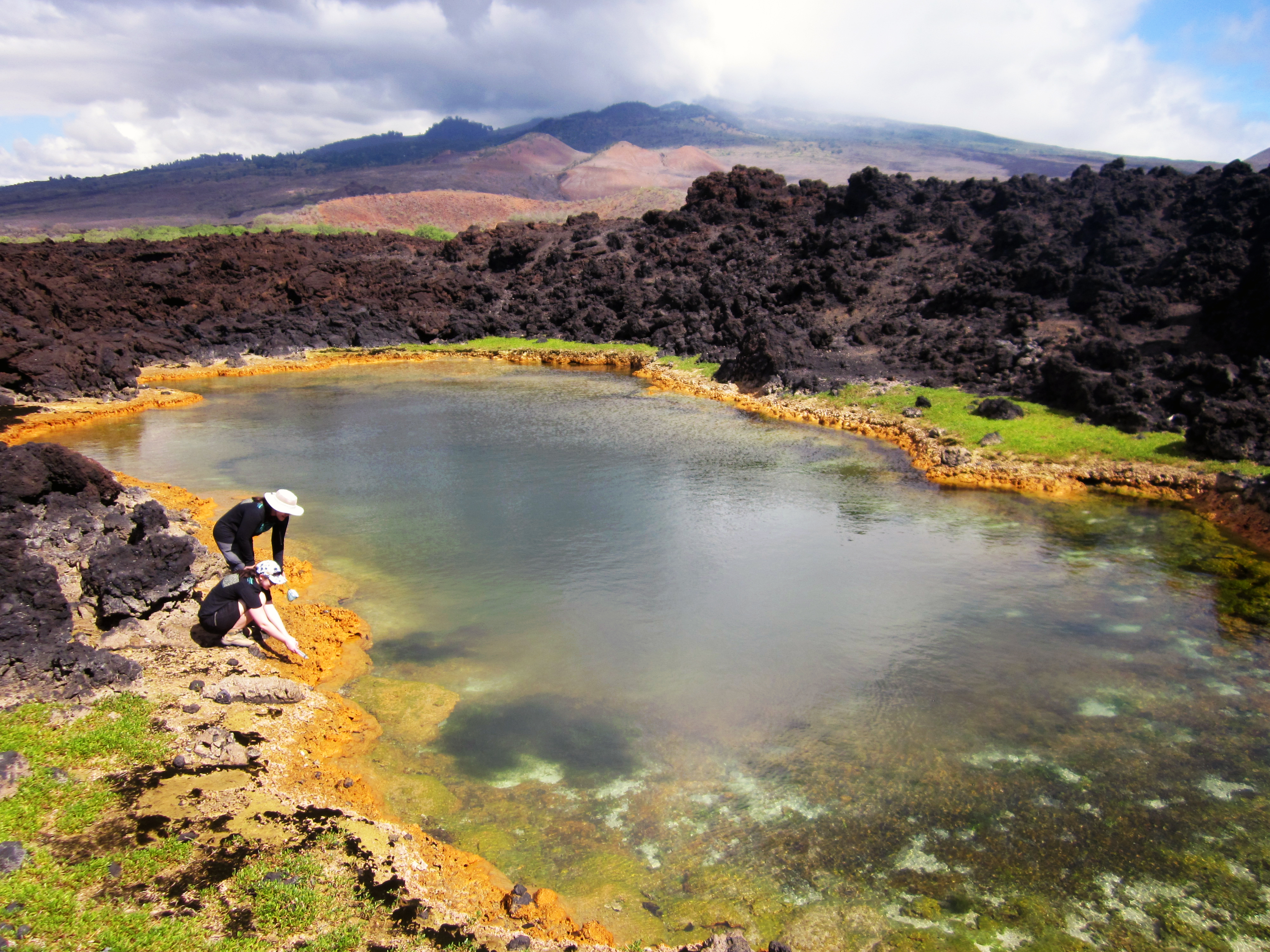
A volcanic anchialine pool in the 'Ahihi-Kina'u Natural Area Reserve on the southwestern coast of Maui, Hawaii.

Anchialine systems are also commonly found in coastal mafic volcanic environments such as the Canary Islands, Galapagos Islands, Samoa, and Hawaii. Lava tubes are the primary mechanism that creates anchialine systems in these volcanic environments. Lava tubes occur during eruptions of fluid-flowing basaltic pahoehoe lava. As lava flows downhill, the atmosphere and cooler surfaces come in contact with the exterior of the flow, causing it to solidify and create a conduit through which the interior liquid lava continues flowing. If the solid conduit empties of liquid lava, the result is a lava tube. Lava tubes flow towards lower elevations and typically stop upon reaching the ocean; however, lava tubes can extend along the seafloor or form from submarine eruptions creating anchialine habitats. Saltwater intruded into many coastal lava tubes during the marine transgression after the last glacial maximum creating many volcanic anchialine pools observed today. Volcanic anchialine systems typically can develop more rapidly than karst systems; on the order of thousands to tens of thousands of years due to their rapid formation at or near the Earth's surface, making them vulnerable to erosional processes.

=== Tectonic faulting formation ===
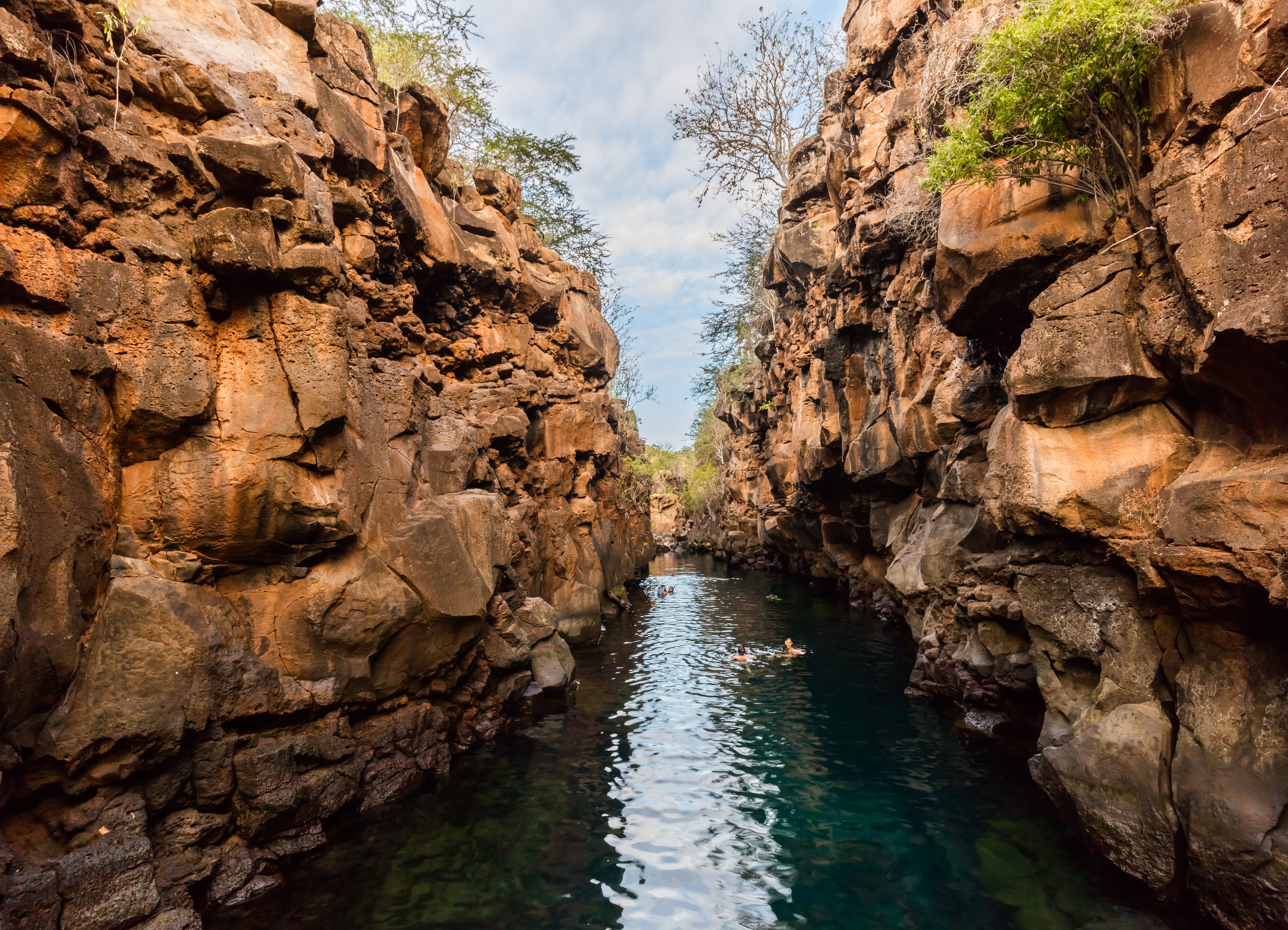
Las Grietas, isla Santa Cruz, islas Galápagos, Ecuador

Tectonic faulting in coastal areas is a less common formation process for anchialine systems. In volcanic and seismically activity areas, faults in coastal environments can be intruded by saline groundwater resulting in anchialine systems. Submerged coastal tectonic faults caused by volcanic activity are observed in Iceland and in the Galapagos Islands, where they are known as "grietas," which translates to "cracks." Faulted anchialine systems can also form from tectonic uplift processes in coastal regions. The Ras Muhammad Crack area in Egypt is an anchialine pool created by an earthquake in 1968 from the uplift of a fossil reef. The earthquake resulted in a fault opening approximately 150 meters from the coastline, which filled with saline groundwater creating an anchialine pool with water depths of up to 14 meters. Deep anchialine pools created by faulting from the uplift of a reef limestone block are also seen on the island of Niue in the Central Pacific.

== Hydrology process ==
Hydrological processes can describe how the water moves between the pool and the surrounding environment. Collectively, these processes change the salinity and the vertical density profile, which sets the conditions for the ecological communities to develop. Although each anchialine system is unique, a box model simplifies the hydrology processes included in each system.

=== Box model ===
To predict mean salinity of an anchialine pool, the pool can be treated as a well-mixed box. Various sources (sinks) add (remove) water and alter the salinity. Below lists several important saline sources and sinks of the pool.

- The seawater seepage into the pool (SE): The barrier between a pool and the ocean controls how much seawater intrudes into a pool. If there are many caves in the barrier or the soil has high porosity, the pool is easier to exchange with the seawater. For example, pools near Kona's coast are saltier than inland pools.
- Evaporation (E): Evaporation removes water from the pool, increasing the salinity. The salinity may be higher than the ocean water under solid evaporation. In a shallow pool without significant seawater flushing, weather events, like a hurricane passing through, cause a significant salinity fluctuation.
- Pool water reflux into the substrate (RE): The reflux is similar to the seawater seepage but in a different direction. The substrate soaks up the dense bottom water and reduces the total salt in the pool.
- Evaporative pumping by the pool brine (EP): The pumping effect buffers evaporation. Under extreme evaporation, the salinity is much higher than water in mud. The salinity difference reverses the osmotic pressure and releases the low salinity water (freshwater or seawater) into the brine. Thus, it slows the rate of salinization.
- The influx of freshwater (F): The freshwater is from surface runoff and groundwater. For example, after considerable rain, lots of freshwater on the surface flows into the pool and dilutes salt water.
- Surface-to-depth relation of the pool water body (S/D): The relationship describes a ratio of evaporation and total water volume. Evaporation is in proportion to the surface area. In a vast and shallow pool, evaporation concentrates brine faster.

The ratio between the evaporation and water exchange with the surrounding, $PS$, implies if the box reach an equilibrium state or not.

$PS = \frac{1}{F} + \frac{E}{SE+EP-RE}+\frac{S}{D}.$

For example, when the evaporation (E or S/D) removes freshwater faster than the influx, the salinity get higher than the ambient ocean. If $PS \sim 1$, salinity is close to open ocean salinity because the salt inflow balances the evaporation. If $2>PS>1$, the pool is metahaline (~40 psu). If $PS >2$, the pool is hypersaline (60~80 psu).

=== Stratification ===
The box model gives an estimate of the saline environment but does not imply the strength of the halocline. The depth of the seawater intake should be considered for the vertical salinity structure. In a pool containing fresh or brackish water, if the denser seawater flushes near the surface, it reduces stratification. However, in the same scenario in a polyhaline pool, the seawater forms a freshwater lens at the top, reinforcing the stratification and potentially creating a hypoxic environment depending on oxygen reaction rates.

== Biogeochemistry ==
Water chemistry of anchialine systems are directly related to the amount of connectivity to the adjacent marine and freshwater inputs, and evaporative losses. Major nutrient compositions (carbon, nitrate, phosphate, and silicate) from the ocean and groundwater sources determine the biogeochemical cycles in an anchialine system. These cycles are affected by the hydrological processes of anchialine systems which vary based on the type, size, and relative inputs of marine and freshwater into the system. Deeper anchialine systems, such as larger pool that resemble lakes, may become highly salinity stratified with depth. The surface consists of brackish oxygen-rich waters followed by a distinct pycnocline and chemocline, below which water has higher salinity and decreased dissolved oxygen (anoxic) concentrations. This stratification and available nutrient resources establishes redox gradients with depth which can support a variety of stratified communities of micro-organisms and biogeochemical cycles.

=== Redox conditions ===
In deeper stratified systems water below the chemocline can be associated with an increase in dissolved hydrogen sulfide, phosphate, and ammonium, and a decrease in particulate organic carbon. The physical and chemical stratification determines which microbial metabolic pathways can occur and creates a vertical stratification of redox processes as oxygen decreases with depth. Oxygen-rich surface waters have a positive reduction potential (Eh), meaning there are oxidizing conditions for aerobic respiration. The chemocline layer has a negative Eh (reducing conditions) and low nutrient availability from the respiration above, so chemosynthetic bacteria reduce nitrate or sulfate for respiration. The productivity in the surface and chemocline layer creates turbid water, below which both oxygen and light levels are low but dissolved inorganic nutrient levels are high creating communities of other reducing microorganisms.

=== Physical nutrient cycling ===
Highly stratified anchialine systems, by definition, have little turbid mixing from wind or water movements. Instead it is suggested that advection of nutrients back into the surface water is caused by the rain of particulate matter below the chemocline displacing water upwards and by the vertical movement of mobile organisms. Introduction of nutrients and organic matter from terrestrial runoff into the surface waters also adds to the nutrient cycling in anchialine systems.

== Biology ==
=== Ecology ===
Anchialine systems have a highly specialized collection of organisms with distinctive adaptations. The species that occupy a given system are strongly determined by the presence or absence of light (pools or caves). A broad diversity of algae and bacteria can be found in anchialine systems, however only few species dominate a given habitat at a time. Systems closer to the coastline tend to have more influence from marine phytoplankton and zooplankton as they are advected in through the groundwater. Systems further inland are more dominated by freshwater algae and terrestrial deposits but exhibit increasingly restricted diversity within algal communities. Due to the ephemeral nature of many anchialine systems and their limited distribution across the planet, many of their inhabitants are either well adapted to tolerate a broad range of salinity and hypoxic conditions or are introduced through tides from neighboring marine habitats. Species that occupy these habitats are generalists or opportunistic as they exploit conditions intolerable for most other species.

==== Crustaceans ====
Crustaceans are by far the most abundant taxa in anchialine systems. Crustacean biodiversity includes Copepoda, Amphipoda, Decapoda, Ascothoracida, and a variety of water fleas.

==== Non-crustacean invertebrates ====
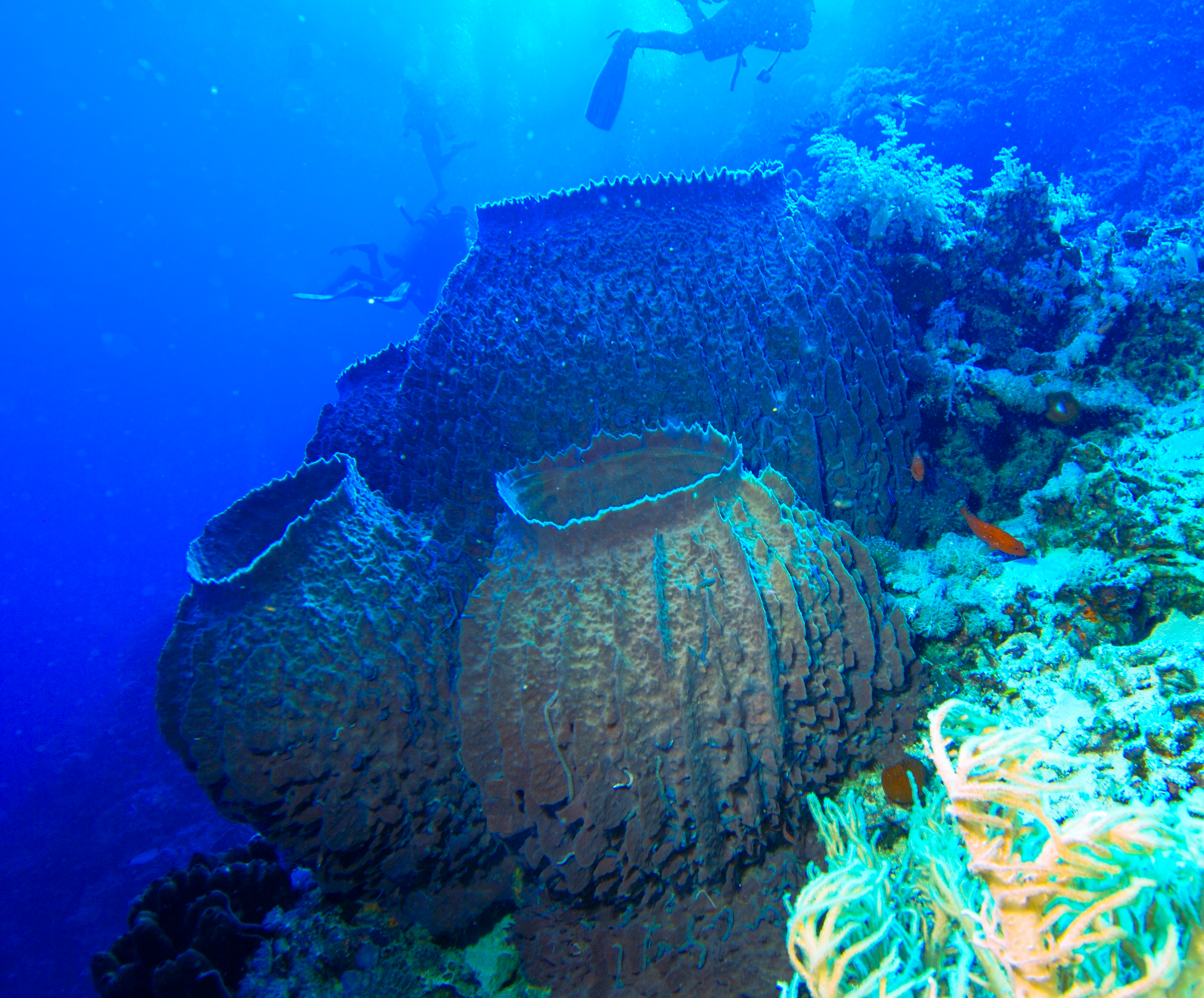
Filter feeding barrel sponges on reef in Blue Hole

Dominant non-crustacean invertebrates groups within anchialine systems include sponges and other filter feeders (most common in Blue Holes), which thrive in moderate flow systems where the structure acts in a way to compress the water and make particulate organic matter less dilute, improving filter feeding efficacy. This is often seen in the hydrodynamic 'pumping' of Blue Holes by Tubellaria (flatworms), and Gastropoda (snails and other mollusks). There are also other smaller non-crustacean inverts including chaetognaths (voracious zooplankton).

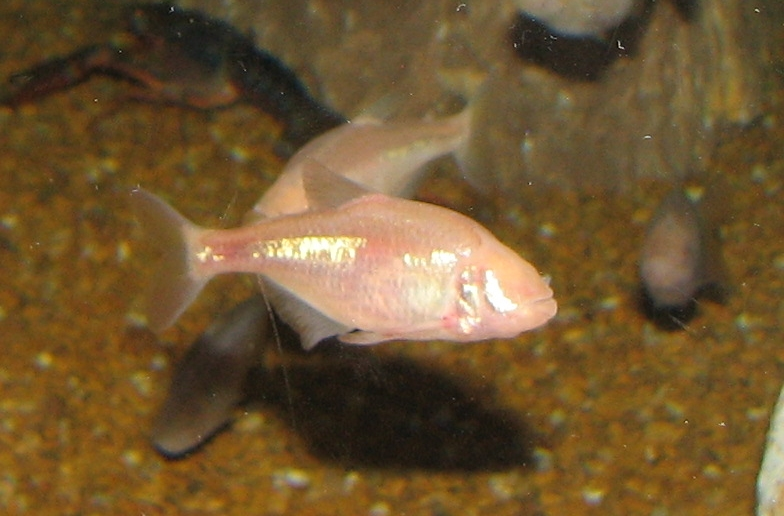
Mexican tetra, blind cave fish. One of the few vertebrates deep within anchialine caves

Food Webs and Microbial Production

In aphotic anchialine caves, food webs may be supported by both organic matter transported from the surface and microbial production within the aquifer. The decomposition of organic material can reduce compounds including ammonium and methane which support chemoautotrophic and methanotrophic organisms.

Stable-isotope and geochemical research in the Mayan Blue cave system in northeastern Yucatàn identified at least three probable food source: organic matter from the overlying forest soil, freshwater algae transported from cenotes, and chemoautotrophic nitrifying bacteria. Nitrate production and a decrease in dissolved oxygen near the halocline were interpreted as evidence for nitrification. Nitrogen-isotope measurements indicated approximately 2-2.5 trophic levels within the studied food web.

Research in the Ox Bel Ha cave system identified a microbial loop that was supported by methane and dissolved organic carbon produced during the degradation of terrestrial organic matter. Methanotrophic and heterotrophic bacteria consumed these compounds, and filter-feeding cave shrimp assimilated the resulting bacterial biomass. The shrimp then transferred this carbon to higher trophic levels. Methanotrophic bacteria were estimated to contribute an average of approximately 21% of the shrimp diet.

A later stable-isotope study at Cenote Vaca Ha near Tulum examined seven endemic stygobitic species. Although isotope values varied among sampling periods, the species retained broadly similar trophic niches. the shrimp, Typhlatya pearsei, had strongly depleted carbon-isotope values consistent with bacterial food sources and was identified as a link between chemosynthetic microbial production and higher consumers.

=== Anchialine pools ===
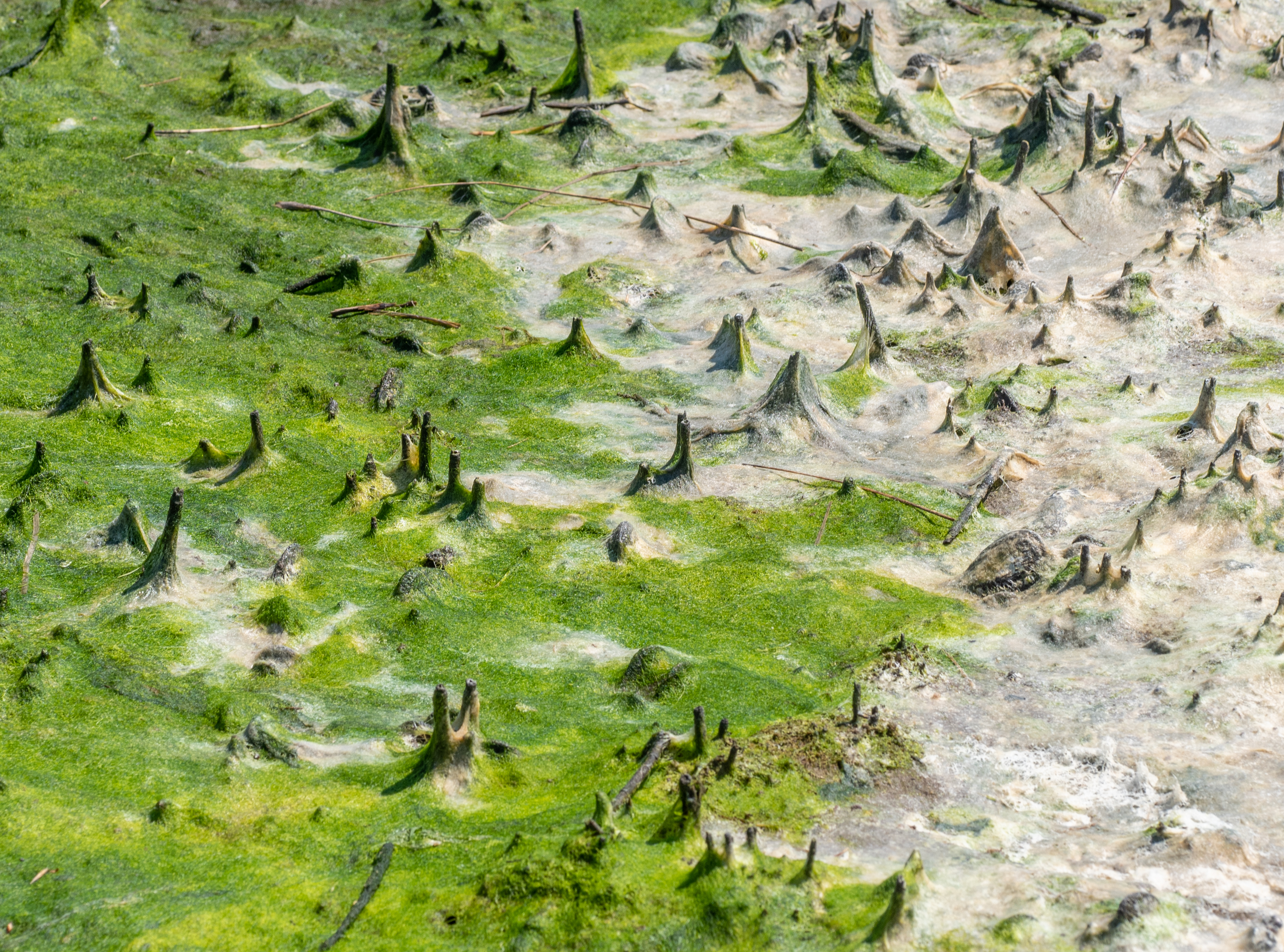
Cyanobacteria algal mat

Hypogeal shrimps have been observed to have high population densities in anchialine ponds upwards of hundreds of individuals per square meter. Many of the shrimp species present in these systems migrate into and out of pools with the tide through the connection at the water table. It is hypothesized they enter pools during flood tides to feed and retreat to cover with ebb tides. There are a range of fish species that can be found in anchialine pools and their presence usually indicates lower populations of hypogeal shrimp and an absence of epigeal shrimp. In Hawaii, the pools are home to the ʻōpaeʻula (Hawaiian shrimp, Halocaridina rubra).

Anchialine pools are considered an ecosystem that combines elements from brackish surface water bodies, subterranean systems, and terrestrial landscapes and are usually wet lit. Algal primary producers inhabit the water column and benthos, while the diversity and productivity are often influenced by geological age and connectivity to the sea. Ecological studies of anchialine pools frequently identify regionally rare and endemic species, while primary producers in these systems are typically algae and bacteria. In pools found in Western Hawaii cyanobacterial mats are dominant, these are common feature among shallow anchialine pools. Found on the substratum, these yellow-orange mats may precipitate minerals that contribute to the overall sedimentation of a pool. Generally, anchialine pools tend to be deeper and saltier the closer they are to shoreline. There is also a high degree of endemism associated with these environments with over 400 endemic species being described in the last 25 years. Thus, when these habitats are degraded or destroyed, it often leads to the extinction of multiple species. Porosity of the substratum can speed up or slow down this process with more porous substratum reducing sedimentation due to increased hydrologic connectivity with the water table which can exhibit a large control on the species that can survive in anchialine pools.

=== Anchialine caves ===
Deep within anchialine cave systems the lack of energy from solar radiation prevents photosynthesis. These dark cave systems are often classified as allochthonous detritus because the dominant input of organic matter is from sources outside the system. In other words, the cave systems ultimately rely on solar radiation for most of their organic matter, but it is formed elsewhere. New research into the chemoautotrophy of caves however may be changing this paradigm with a greater dependence on sulfate-reducing microbes and methanogens. In both cases, the accumulation of particulate matter is largely found at the halocline interface between 2 and 0 PSU. The concentration of organic particles is also seen at saline boundaries in other estuarine systems as well with elevated concentrations of particles at estuarine turbidity maximum.

Fauna that reside strictly within the aphotic zone of anchialine caves typically exhibit adaptations associated with low light and food, and are often classified as stygofauna. Anchialine systems are classically restricted in terms of fluxes (water, nutrients, organisms) in and out of the system. Many of the organisms in anchialine caves lack pigmentation; they have evolved to save energy by not developing chromatophores. Another adaptation from the lack of solar radiation is that many of these organisms have no eyes, a very energy intensive organelle they no longer need. Stygofauna are however quite different than deep sea organisms, most of which have kept their eyes and specialized them to see bioluminescence and possibly Cherenkov radiation in their otherwise dark environments. There are no known bioluminescent stygobites to date, despite this adaptation's popularity in other dark systems.

Outside of light availability, there are a wide variety of geochemical parameters that affect the biology and ecology within these systems. Possibly the most notable and universal in these systems is the strong halocline. While some anchialine systems are entirely salt water (i.e. blue holes) other more inland systems (i.e. cenotes) often have a freshwater lens that can extend hundreds of feet deep or for miles underground until they meet the ocean interface. The halocline not only acts as a physical barrier in density but as a niche partitioning factor that segregates these systems into stenohaline and euryhaline organisms with the latter having the competitive advantage of being able to move between these two niches. In many low-latitude locations where the majority of these systems are found, the temperature of the intruding seawater is much warmer than the phreatic freshwater. Because of discrepancy between warmer seawater and cooler groundwater, temperatures of the anchialine system may also increase with depth and penetration, which has implications for growth and respiration rates.

== Exploitation and conservation ==
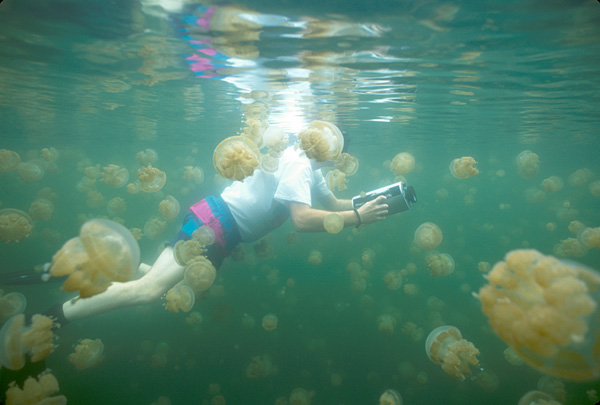
Jellyfish in anchialine lake in Micronesia

The diversity of unusual and rare species found in anchialine has attracted tourists and recreational divers from across the globe. Tourism generated from the anchialine systems in Bermuda play an important role in the economy. The Palau lakes are famous for their jellyfish populations and have even had an IMAX feature film made about them called 'The Living Sea'.

However, tourism and direct exploitation of anchialine systems has resulted in degradation of their environmental health. Approximately 90% of Hawaii's anchialine habitat have been degraded or lost due to development and introduction of exotic species. Hawaii's anchialine systems are currently one of the most threatened habitats in the archipelago. Pollution from tourism has led to endangered crustaceans in Sipun cave in Cavat. Some anchialine systems are exploited for limestone for use in construction. This mining results in the collapse and destruction of anchialine caves. Ha Long Bay marine lakes have been exploited by residents in surrounding boat villages for fisheries and aquaculture. Anchialine pools are also intentionally filled for development purposes. Tidal currents have been shown to sweep in trash into unexplored areas of Blue Holes in the Bahamas. Some caves in Bermuda, the Canary Islands, and Mallorca are used as wishing wells which increases concentration of copper and is thought to have caused the decline of the squat lobster, Munidopsis polymorpha. Cave divers also have unintended negative impacts on these habitats by using flashlights that enable fish such as Astyanax fasciatus to feed on otherwise inaccessible prey. Additionally, cave diving can negatively alter water chemistry in normally hypoxic cave environments by introducing oxygen.

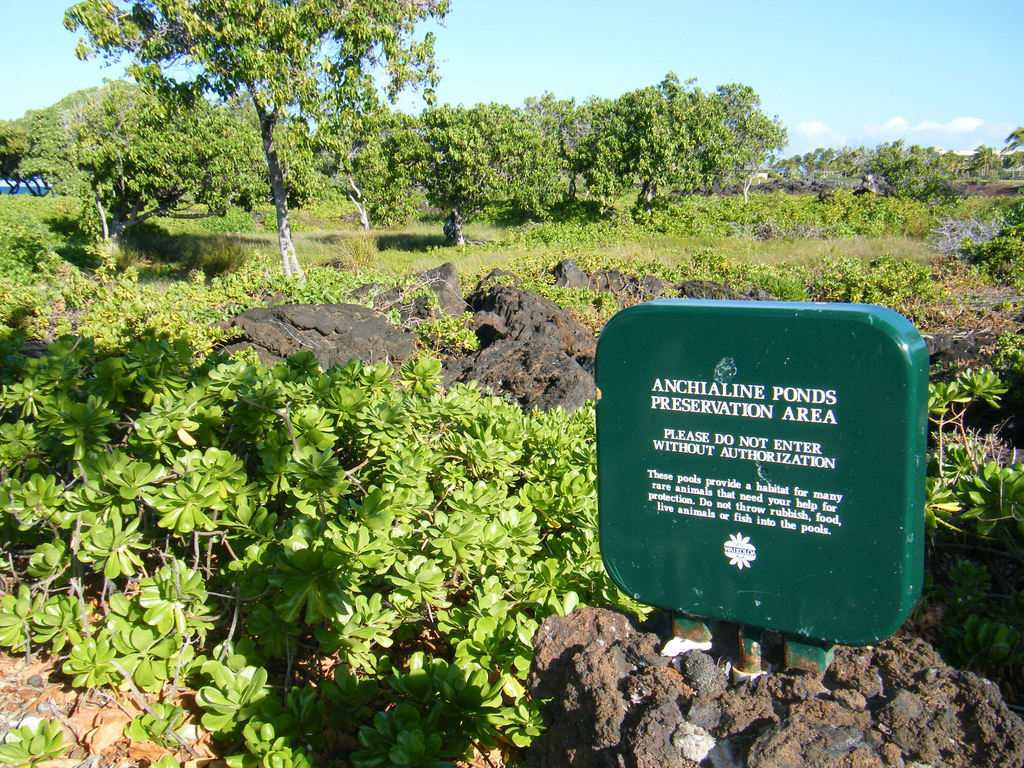
Protected anchialine pools in Hawaii

Due to the high endemism in these environments and limited global distribution, many species in anchialine systems are at risk of extinction. 25 species are ICUN red list in Bermuda and other species are on the Mexican list of threatened and endangered species in the Yucatán. Alien or introduced species also pose a significant threat to the ecological health of anchialine systems. These species could be introduced intentionally for the purpose of harvest or recreation or unintentionally from equipment on recreational divers. In Vietnam, green sea turtles were introduced into anchialine pools for practices related to animistic rites and consumption. Exotic species introduction is a primary driver for anchialine habitat degradation in Hawaii.

There has been policy and management action to protect the health of these environments. In Hawaii the Waikoloa anchialine Preservation Area Program (WAPPA) monitors the water quality of coastal environments including anchialine pools. There has been little evidence yet to suggest the fauna of these pools are sensitive to water quality changes, however they may be more threatened by the increase of pool exploitation for recreational purposes due to increased accessibility from tourism development. There are also conservation efforts in Maui and the Sinai peninsula to protect anchialine habitats in those areas.

== Ongoing research ==
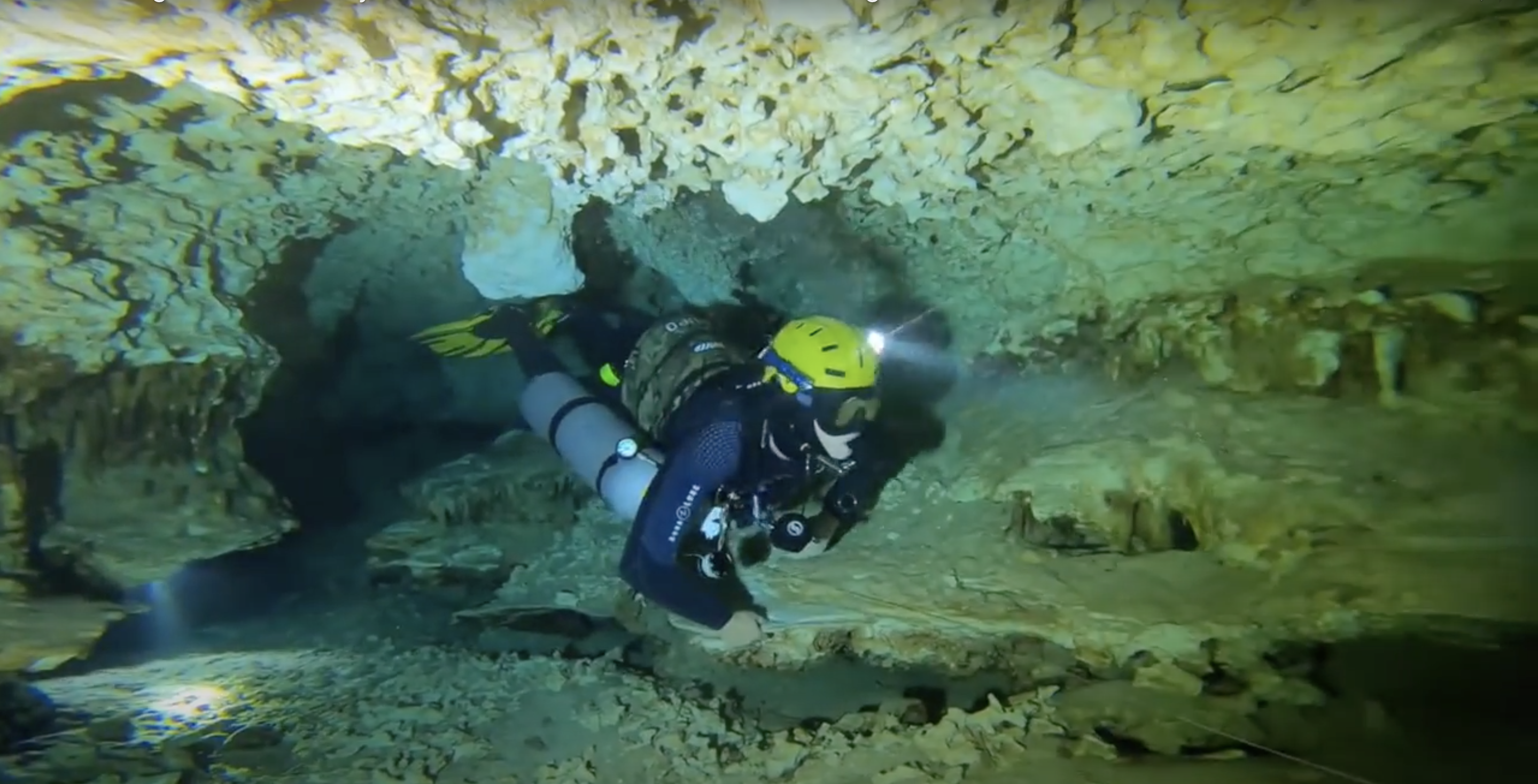
Cave diver in a karst anchialine system. Sidemount tanks on each side allow further exploration.

=== Cave diving ===
The primary way in which people study and explore the subterranean sections of anchialine systems is through cave diving. Using highly specialized techniques, divers navigate the sprawling overhead environment to form detailed maps of the underground aquifers, collect a variety of biologic, geologic, or chemical samples, and track hydrologic flow. Advances in cave diving technology, such as DPVs and rebreathers, facilitates data collection further into cave systems with lower environmental impact.

=== Climate change ===
The complicated geometry of anchialine systems limits the understanding of hydrologic processes involved, requiring many studies to estimate or model the processes thought to be contributing to the physical and chemical properties of the system. More recent studies look at categorizing changes in biodiversity and physical characteristics of anchialine systems under changing climate conditions. It is currently an area of active research to predict how climate change induced sea level rise may affect the formation and health of anchialine systems in the near future.
