= List of Cymatodera species =

This is a list of species in the genus Cymatodera.

== Cymatodera species ==
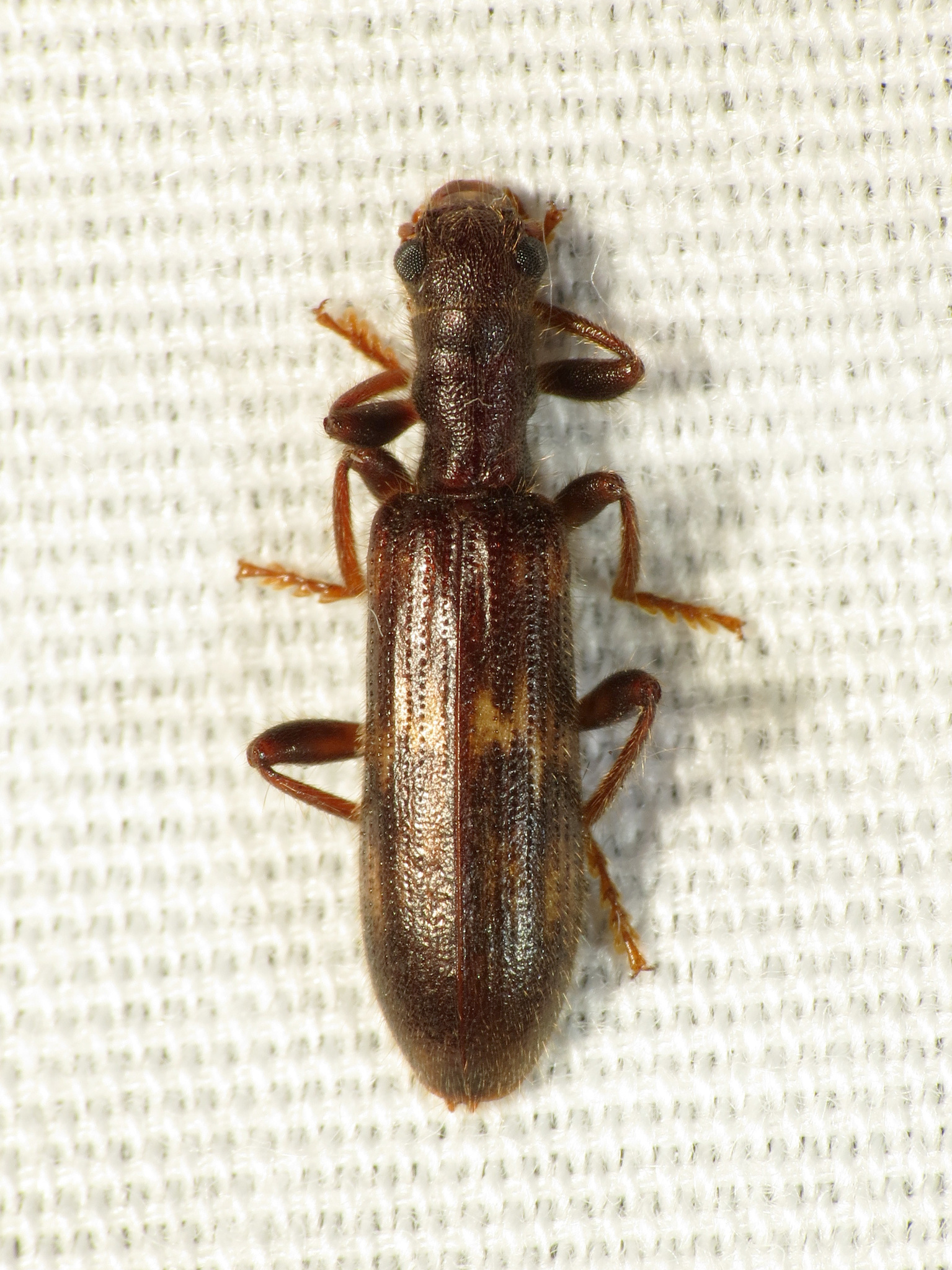
Cymatodera flavosignata

- Cymatodera aegra Wolcott, 1921
- Cymatodera aegra-complex
- Cymatodera aethiops Wolcott, 1910
- Cymatodera angustata Spinola, 1844
- Cymatodera antennata Schaeffer, 1908
- Cymatodera arizonica Schaeffer, 1908
- Cymatodera balteata LeConte, 1854 (banded checkered beetle)
- Cymatodera belfragei Horn, 1876
- Cymatodera bicolor (Say, 1825)
- Cymatodera brevicollis Schaeffer, 1917
- Cymatodera californica Horn, 1868
- Cymatodera cazierorum Barr, 1972
- Cymatodera cephalica Schaeffer, 1908
- Cymatodera chisosensis Barr, 1972
- Cymatodera corporaali Barr, 1948
- Cymatodera cylindricollis Chevrolat, 1833
- Cymatodera decipiens Fall, 1906
- Cymatodera delicatula Fall, 1906
- Cymatodera dietrichi Barr, 1952
- Cymatodera fascifera LeConte, 1866
- Cymatodera flavosignata Schaeffer, 1908
- Cymatodera floridana Barr, 1972
- Cymatodera fuchsii Schaeffer, 1904
- Cymatodera fuscula LeConte, 1852
- Cymatodera hopei Gray in Griffith, 1832
- Cymatodera horni Wolcott, 1910
- Cymatodera hurdi Barr, 1972
- Cymatodera ignava Rifkind, Toledo and Corona, 2010
- Cymatodera inornata (Say, 1835) (inornate checkered beetle)
- Cymatodera knausi Wolcott, 1921
- Cymatodera laevicollis Schaeffer, 1908
- Cymatodera latefascia Schaeffer, 1904
- Cymatodera lauta Barr, 1972
- Cymatodera linsleyi Barr, 1972
- Cymatodera longicornis LeConte, 1849
- Cymatodera maculifera Barr, 1948
- Cymatodera mitchelli Chapin, 1927
- Cymatodera morosa LeConte, 1858
- Cymatodera neomexicana Knull, 1934
- Cymatodera obliquefasciata Schaeffer, 1904
- Cymatodera oblita Horn, 1876
- Cymatodera ovipennis LeConte, 1859
- Cymatodera pallida Schaeffer, 1908
- Cymatodera parkeri Barr, 1972
- Cymatodera pseudotsugae Barr, 1947
- Cymatodera pubescens Wolcott, 1909
- Cymatodera punctata LeConte, 1852
- Cymatodera puncticollis Bland, 1863
- Cymatodera purpuricollis Horn, 1894
- Cymatodera santarosae Schaeffer, 1905
- Cymatodera schwarzi Wolcott, 1921
- Cymatodera scitula Barr, 1972
- Cymatodera serena Barr, 1972
- Cymatodera sirpata Horn, 1885
- Cymatodera snowi Wolcott, 1910
- Cymatodera sobara Barr, 1960
- Cymatodera sodalis Barr, 1972
- Cymatodera tlahuica Rifkind, Toledo and Corona, 2010
- Cymatodera tricolor Skinner, 1905
- Cymatodera turbata
- Cymatodera tuta Wolcott, 1910
- Cymatodera tutoides Barr, 1972
- Cymatodera undulata (Say, 1825) (undulate checkered beetle)
- Cymatodera uniformis Schaeffer, 1905
- Cymatodera usta LeConte, 1858
- Cymatodera vandykei Schaeffer, 1904
- Cymatodera vulgivaga Barr, 1972
- Cymatodera werneri Barr, 1952
- Cymatodera wolcotti Barr, 1950
- Cymatodera xanti Horn, 1876
- Cymatodera xavierae Knull, 1940
- Cymatodera zosterops Barr, 1972
