= Evolution of insects =

Development of insects from an ancestral crustacean and their subsequent radiation

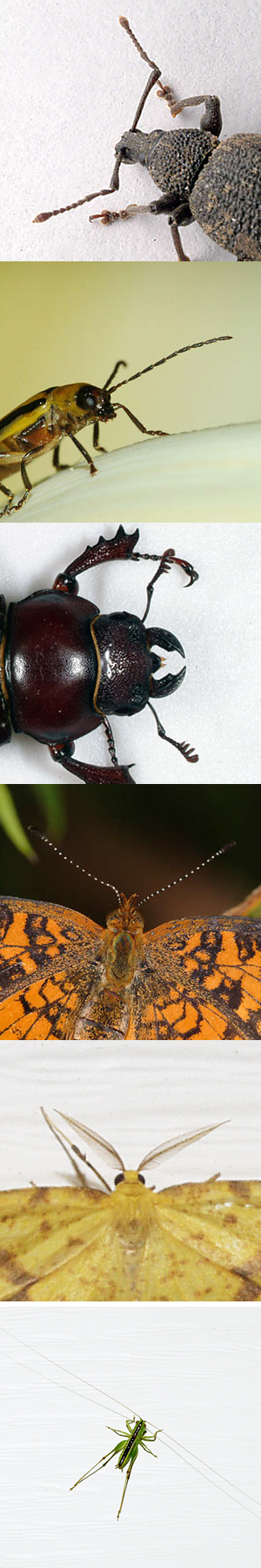
Evolution has produced a wide variety of appendages in insects, such as these antennae.

Understanding of the evolution of insects is based on studies of the following branches of science: molecular biology, insect morphology, paleontology, insect taxonomy, evolution, embryology, bioinformatics, and scientific computing. The study of insect fossils is known as paleoentomology. It is estimated that the class of insects originated on Earth about 480 million years ago, in the Ordovician, at about the same time terrestrial plants appeared. Insects are thought to have evolved from a group of crustaceans. The first insects were landbound, but about 400 million years ago in the Devonian period one lineage of insects evolved flight, the first animals to do so. The oldest insect fossil has been proposed to be Rhyniognatha hirsti, estimated to be 400 million years old, but the insect identity of the fossil has been contested. Global climate conditions changed several times during the history of Earth, and along with it the diversity of insects. The Pterygotes (winged insects) underwent a major radiation in the Carboniferous (358 to 299 million years ago) while the Endopterygota (insects that go through different life stages with metamorphosis) underwent another major radiation in the Permian (299 to 252 million years ago).

Most extant orders of insects developed during the Permian period. Many of the early groups became extinct during the mass extinction at the Permo-Triassic boundary, the largest extinction event in the history of the Earth, around 252 million years ago. The survivors of this event evolved in the Triassic (252 to 201 million years ago) to what are essentially the modern insect orders that persist to this day. Most modern insect families appeared in the Jurassic (201 to 145 million years ago).

In an important example of co-evolution, a number of highly successful insect groups — especially the Hymenoptera (wasps, bees and ants) and Lepidoptera (butterflies) as well as many types of Diptera (flies) and Coleoptera (beetles) — evolved in conjunction with flowering plants during the Cretaceous (145 to 66 million years ago).

Many modern insect genera developed during the Cenozoic that began about 66 million years ago; insects from this period onward frequently became preserved in amber, often in perfect condition. Such specimens are easily compared with modern species, and most of them are members of extant genera.

== Evolutionary history ==
The insect fossil record extends back some 400 million years to the lower Devonian, while the Pterygotes (winged insects) underwent a major radiation in the Carboniferous. The Endopterygota underwent another major radiation in the Permian. Survivors of the mass extinction at the P-T boundary evolved in the Triassic to what are essentially the modern Insecta orders that persist to modern times. Most modern insect families appeared in the Jurassic, and further diversification probably in genera occurred in the Cretaceous. By the Tertiary, there existed many of what are still modern genera; hence, most insects in amber are, indeed, members of extant genera. Insects diversified in only about 100 million years into essentially modern forms. The evolution of insects is closely related to the evolution of flowering plants. Insect adaptations include feeding on flowers and related structures, with some 20% of extant insects depending on flowers, nectar or pollen for their food source. This symbiotic relationship is even more paramount in evolution considering that more than 2/3 of flowering plants are insect pollinated. Insects, particularly mosquitoes and flies, are also vectors of many pathogens that may even have been responsible for the decimation or extinction of some mammalian species.

=== Before the Devonian ===
Molecular analysis by Gaunt & Miles 2002 suggests that the hexapods diverged from their sister group, the Anostraca (fairy shrimps), at around the start of the Silurian period 440 million years ago - coinciding with the appearance of vascular plants on land.

Misof et al. 2014 suggest that insects could have appeared much earlier, in the Early Ordovician or even Cambrian. According to this version, the early radiation of insects occurred no later than 479 million years ago in marine or coastal environments. However, the authors emphasize that due to the lack of insect fossils of the Cambrian to the Silurian, this version remains highly controversial.

=== Devonian ===
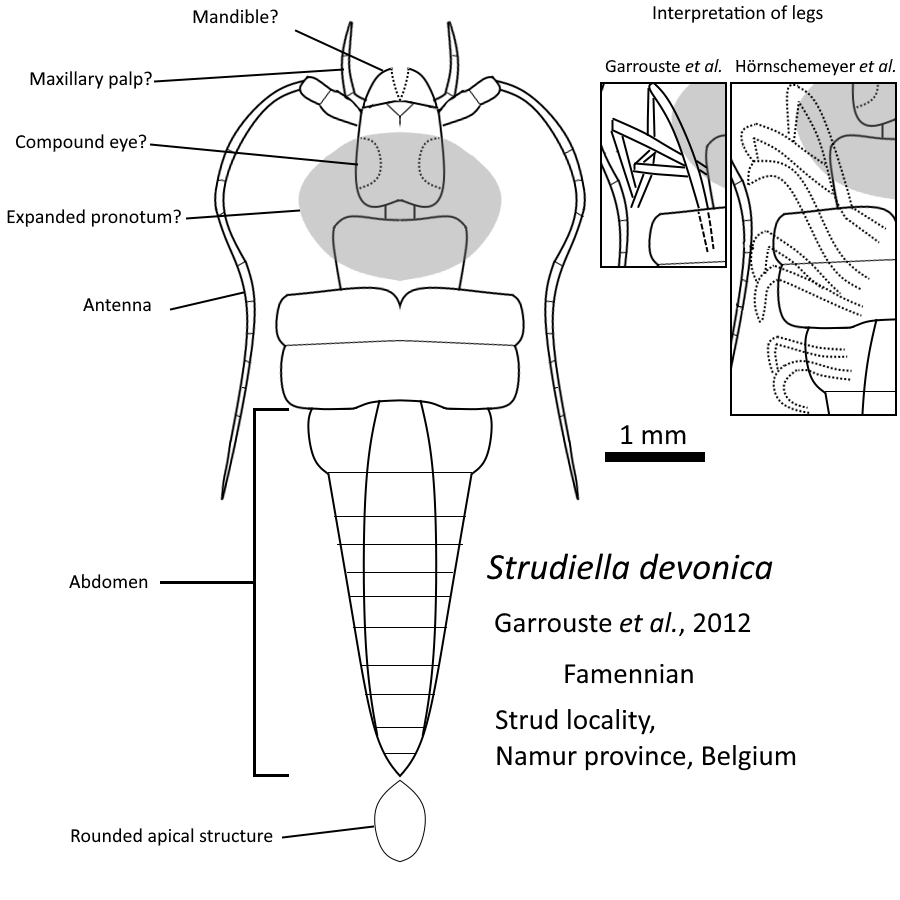
Reconstruction of Strudiella devonica as a possible hexapod

The Devonian (419 to 359 million years ago) was a relatively warm period, and probably lacked any glaciers. Fossils that were considered as Devonian insects, such as Rhyniognatha hirsti or Strudiella devonica were later reconsidered that their affinities as insects are insufficient. But based on phylogenic study, the first insects probably appeared earlier, in the Silurian period, from stem-group crustaceans like Tanazios dokeron that had lost the second antenna. The first winged insect likely evolved in the Devonian given the appearance of large numbers of insects with wings in the Carboniferous. Based on the discovery of geolologically younger & better preserved relatives, Leverhulmia was re-stablished in 2026 as the earliest unequivocal stem-group insects in the fossil record. Molecular data suggest that winged insects evolved in the Early Devonian and that Palaeoptera split from Neoptera in the Late Devonian.

=== Carboniferous ===
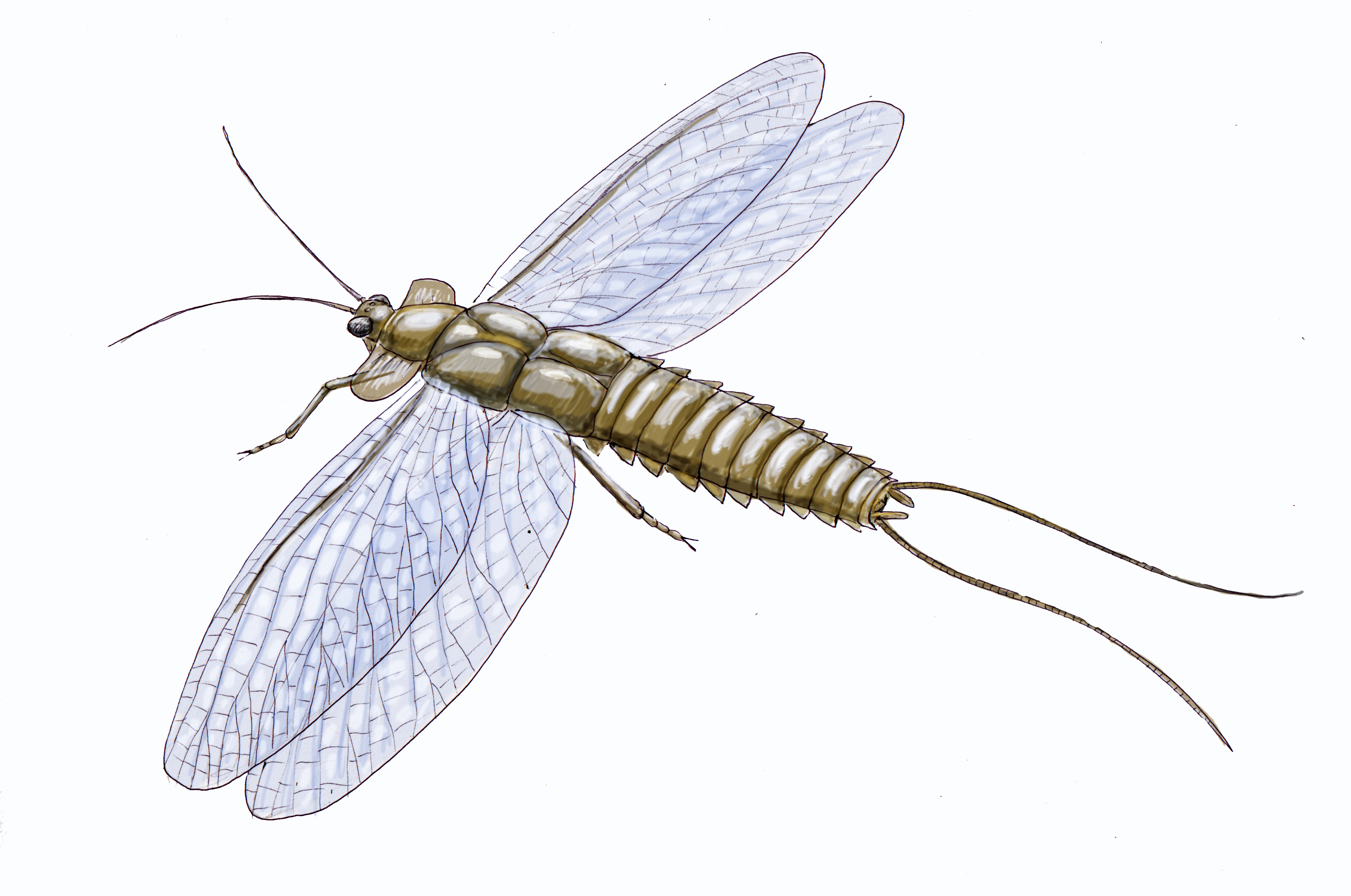
Mazothairos, a Carboniferous member of the now extinct order Palaeodictyoptera.

The Carboniferous (359 to 299 million years ago) is famous for its wet, warm climates and extensive swamps of mosses, ferns, horsetails, and calamites. Glaciations in Gondwana, triggered by Gondwana's southward movement, continued into the Permian and because of the lack of clear markers and breaks, the deposits of this glacial period are often referred to as Permo-Carboniferous in age. The cooling and drying of the climate led to the Carboniferous rainforest collapse (CRC). Tropical rain forests fragmented and then were eventually devastated by climate change.

The 2026 identification of Chosha praecursor, an amphibious stem-insect from the Late Mississippian Tesnus Formation of Texas suggested the revision of previously dubious referred taxa, as well unnamed specimens from Mazon Creek fossil beds.

Remains of insects are scattered throughout coal deposits, particularly of wings from stem-dictyopterans (Blattoptera); two deposits in particular are from Mazon Creek, Illinois and Commentry, France. The earliest winged insects are from this time period (Pterygota), including the aforementioned Blattoptera, Caloneurodea, primitive stem-group Ephemeropterans, Orthoptera, and Palaeodictyopteroidea. As of 2025, the oldest known winged insects are Xenoptera latigra (Megasecoptera), Tupacsala niunamenos (Eugeroptera), Argentinala cristinae (Argentinoptera) and Kirchnerala treintamil (Kukaloptera) from the Guandacol Formation (Arnsbergian) of Argentina. They are followed by Delitzschala bitterfeldensis (Spilapteridae) of Germany. In 1940 (in Noble County, Oklahoma), a fossil of Meganeuropsis americana represented the largest complete insect wing ever found. Juvenile insects too are known from the period.

Very early Blattopterans had a large, discoid pronotum and leathery forewings with a distinct CuP vein (a unbranched wing vein, lying near the claval fold and reaching the wing posterior margin). These were not true cockroaches, as they had an ovipositor, although through the Carboniferous, the ovipositor started to diminish. The orders Caloneurodea and Miomoptera are known, with Orthoptera and Blattodea to be among the earliest Neoptera; developing from the upper Carboniferous to the Permian. These insects had wings with similar form and structure: small anal lobes.

Palaeodictyopteroidea is a large and diverse group that includes 50% of all known Paleozoic insects. Containing many of the primitive features of the time: very long cerci, an ovipositor, and wings with little or no anal lobe. Protodonata, as its name implies, is a primitive paraphyletic group similar to Odonata; although lacks distinct features such as a nodus, a pterostigma and an arculus. Most were only slightly larger than modern dragonflies, but the group does include the largest known insects, such as griffinflies like the late Carboniferous Meganeura monyi, and the even larger later Permian Meganeuropsis permiana, with wingspans of up to 71 cm (2 ft 4 in). They were probably the top predators for some 100 million years and far larger than any present-day insects. Their nymphs must also have reached a very impressive size. This gigantism may have been due to higher atmospheric oxygen-levels (up to 80% above modern levels during the Carboniferous) that allowed increased respiratory efficiency relative to today. This allowed giant forms of pterygotes, millipedes and scorpions to exist, making the newly arrived tetrapods remain small until the Carboniferous Rainforest Collapse. However, a large griffinfly with a wingspan about 43–47 cm (1 ft 5 in – 1 ft 7 in) is known from the late Permian, when the oxygen level was much lower. In addition, griffinflies probably lived in open habitats, as evidenced by Meganeurites gracilipes. M. gracilipes exhibited elongate wings that did not befit densely forested habitats, and had dorsally enlarged compound eyes much like modern dragonflies that hunt in open habitats.

=== Permian ===
The Permian (299 to 252 million years ago) was a relatively short time period, during which all the Earth's major land masses were collected into a single supercontinent known as Pangaea. Pangaea straddled the equator and extended toward the poles, with a corresponding effect on ocean currents in the single great ocean ("Panthalassa", the "universal sea"), and the Paleo-Tethys Ocean, a large ocean that was between Asia and Gondwana. The Cimmeria continent rifted away from Gondwana and drifted north to Laurasia, causing the Paleo-Tethys to shrink. At the end of the Permian, the biggest mass extinction in history occurred, collectively called the Permian–Triassic extinction event: 30% of all insect species became extinct; this is one of three known mass insect extinctions in Earth's history.

A 2007 study based on DNA of living beetles and maps of likely beetle evolution indicated that beetles may have originated during the Lower Permian, up to 299 million years ago. In 2009, a fossil beetle was described from the Pennsylvanian of Mazon Creek, Illinois, pushing the origin of the beetles to an earlier date, 318 to 299 million years ago. Fossils from this time have been found in Asia and Europe, for instance in the red slate fossil beds of Niedermoschel near Mainz, Germany. Further fossils have been found in Obora, Czech Republic and Tshekarda in the Ural mountains, Russia. More discoveries from North America were made in the Wellington Formation of Oklahoma and were published in 2005 and 2008. Some of the most important fossil deposits from this era are from Elmo, Kansas (260 mya); others include New South Wales, Australia (240 mya) and central Eurasia (250 mya).

During this time, many of the species from the Carboniferous diversified, and many new orders developed, including: Protelytroptera, primitive relatives of Plecoptera (Paraplecoptera), Psocoptera, Mecoptera, Coleoptera, Raphidioptera, and Neuroptera, the last four being the first definitive records of the Holometabola. By the Pennsylvanian and well into the Permian, by far the most successful were primitive Blattoptera, or relatives of cockroaches. Six fast legs, two well-developed folding wings, fairly good eyes, long, well-developed antennae (olfactory), an omnivorous digestive system, a receptacle for storing sperm, a chitin skeleton that could support and protect, as well as a form of gizzard and efficient mouth parts, gave it formidable advantages over other herbivorous animals. About 90% of insects were cockroach-like insects ("Blattopterans"). The dragonflies Odonata were the dominant aerial predator and probably dominated terrestrial insect predation as well. True Odonata appeared in the Permian and all are amphibian. Their prototypes are the oldest winged fossils, go back to the Devonian, and are different from other wings in every way. Their prototypes may have had the beginnings of many modern attributes even by late Carboniferous and it is possible that they even captured small vertebrates, for some species had a wing span of 71 cm.

The oldest known insect that resembles species of Coleoptera date back to the Lower Permian (270 million years ago), though they instead have 13-segmented antennae, elytra with more fully developed venation and more irregular longitudinal ribbing, and an abdomen and ovipositor extending beyond the apex of the elytra. The oldest true beetle would have features that include 11-segmented antennae, regular longitudinal ribbing on the elytra, and having genitalia that are internal. The earliest beetle-like species had pointed, leather like forewings with cells and pits. Hemiptera, or true bugs had appeared in the form of Actinoscytina and Paraknightia. The later had expanded paranotal lobes, a large ovipositor, and forewings with unusual venation, possibly diverging from Blattoptera. The orders Raphidioptera and Neuroptera are grouped together as Neuropterida. The one family of putative Raphidiopteran clade (Sojanoraphidiidae) has been controversially placed as so. Although the group had a long ovipositor distinctive to this order and a series of short crossveins, however with a primitive wing venation. Early families of Plecoptera had wing venation consistent with the order and its recent descendants. Psocoptera was first appeared in the Permian period, they are often regarded as the most primitive of the hemipteroids.

=== Triassic ===
The Triassic (252 to 201 million years ago) was a period when arid and semiarid savannas developed and when the first mammals, dinosaurs, and pterosaurs appeared. During the Triassic, almost all the Earth's land mass was still concentrated into Pangaea. From the east a vast gulf entered Pangaea, the Tethys sea. The remaining shores were surrounded by the world-ocean known as Panthalassa. The supercontinent Pangaea was rifting during the Triassic—especially late in the period—but had not yet separated.

The climate of the Triassic was generally hot and dry, forming typical red bed sandstones and evaporites. There is no evidence of glaciation at or near either pole; in fact, the polar regions were apparently moist and temperate, a climate suitable for reptile-like creatures. Pangaea's large size limited the moderating effect of the global ocean; its continental climate was highly seasonal, with very hot summers and cold winters. It probably had strong, cross-equatorial monsoons.

As a consequence of the P-Tr Mass Extinction at the border of Permian and Triassic, there is only little fossil record of insects including beetles from the Lower Triassic. However, there are a few exemptions, like in Eastern Europe: At the Babiy Kamen site in the Kuznetsk Basin numerous beetle fossils were discovered, even entire specimen of the infraorders Archostemata (i.e., Ademosynidae, Schizocoleidae), Adephaga (i.e., Triaplidae, Trachypachidae) and Polyphaga (i.e., Hydrophilidae, Byrrhidae, Elateroidea) and in nearly a perfectly preserved condition. However, species from the families Cupedidae and Schizophoridae are not present at this site, whereas they dominate at other fossil sites from the Lower Triassic. Further records are known from Khey-Yaga, Russia in the Korotaikha Basin.

Around this time, during the Late Triassic, mycetophagous, or fungus feeding species of beetle (i.e., Cupedidae) appear in the fossil record. In the stages of the Upper Triassic representatives of the algophagous, or algae feeding species (i.e., Triaplidae and Hydrophilidae) begin to appear, as well as predatory water beetles. The first primitive weevils appear (i.e., Obrieniidae), as well as the first representatives of the rove beetles (i.e., Staphylinidae), which show no marked difference in physique compared to recent species.

The first true species of Diptera are known from the Middle Triassic, becoming widespread during the Middle and Late Triassic . A single large wing from a species of Diptera in the Triassic (10 mm instead of usual 2–6 mm) was found in Australia (Mt. Crosby). This family Tilliardipteridae, despite the numerous 'tipuloid' features, should be included in Psychodomorpha sensu Hennig on account of loss of the convex distal 1A reaching wing margin and formation of the anal loop.

=== Jurassic ===
The Jurassic (201 to 145 million years ago) was important in the development of birds, one of the insects' major predators. During the early Jurassic period, the supercontinent Pangaea broke up into the northern supercontinent Laurasia and the southern supercontinent Gondwana; the Gulf of Mexico opened in the new rift between North America and what is now Mexico's Yucatan Peninsula. The Jurassic North Atlantic Ocean was relatively narrow, while the South Atlantic did not open until the following Cretaceous Period, when Gondwana itself rifted apart.

The global climate during the Jurassic was warm and humid. Similar to the Triassic, there were no larger landmasses situated near the polar caps and consequently, no inland ice sheets existed during the Jurassic. Although some areas of North and South America and Africa stayed arid, large parts of the continental landmasses were lush. The laurasian and the gondwanian fauna differed considerably in the Early Jurassic. Later it became more intercontinental and many species started to spread globally.

There are many important sites from the Jurassic, with more than 150 important sites with beetle fossils, the majority being situated in Eastern Europe and North Asia. In North America and especially in South America and Africa the number of sites from that time period is smaller and the sites have not been exhaustively investigated yet. Outstanding fossil sites include Solnhofen in Upper Bavaria, Germany, Karatau in South Kazakhstan, the Yixian Formation in Liaoning, North China as well as the Jiulongshan Formation and further fossil sites in Mongolia. In North America there are only a few sites with fossil records of insects from the Jurassic, namely the shell limestone deposits in the Hartford basin, the Deerfield basin and the Newark basin.

During the Jurassic there was a dramatic increase in the known diversity of Coleoptera families. This includes the development and growth of carnivorous and herbivorous species. Species of the superfamily Chrysomeloidea are believed to have developed around the same time, which include a wide array of plant host ranging from cycads and conifers, to angiosperms.

=== Cretaceous ===
The Cretaceous (145 to 66 million years ago) had much of the same insect fauna as the Jurassic until much later on. At the peak of the Cretaceous transgression, one-third of Earth's present land area was submerged. The Berriasian epoch showed a cooling trend that had been seen in the last epoch of the Jurassic. There is evidence that snowfalls were common in the higher latitudes and the tropics became wetter than during the Triassic and Jurassic. Glaciation was however restricted to alpine glaciers on some high-latitude mountains, though seasonal snow may have existed farther south. Rafting by ice of stones into marine environments occurred during much of the Cretaceous but evidence of deposition directly from glaciers is limited to the Early Cretaceous of the Eromanga Basin in southern Australia.

There are a large number of important fossil sites worldwide containing beetles from the Cretaceous. Most of them are located in Europe and Asia and belong to the temperate climate zone during the Cretaceous. A few of the fossil sites mentioned in the chapter Jurassic also shed some light on the early cretaceous beetle fauna (e.g. the Yixian formation in Liaoning, North China). Further important sites from the Lower Cretaceous include the Crato Fossil Beds in the Araripe basin in the Ceará, North Brazil as well as overlying Santana formation, with the latter was situated near the paleoequator, or the position of the earth's equator in the geologic past as defined for a specific geologic period. In Spain there are important sites near Montsec and Las Hoyas. In Australia the Koonwarra Fossil Bed, South Gippsland, Victoria is noteworthy. Important fossil sites from the Upper Cretaceous are Kzyl-Dzhar in South Kazakhstan and Arkagala in Russia.

During the Cretaceous the diversity of Cupedidae and Archostemata decreased considerably. Predatory ground beetles (Carabidae) and rove beetles (Staphylinidae) began to distribute into different patterns: whereas the Carabidae predominantly occurred in the warm regions, the Staphylinidae and click beetles (Elateridae) preferred many areas with temperate climate. Likewise, predatory species of Cleroidea and Cucujoidea, hunted their prey under the bark of trees together with the jewel beetles (Buprestidae). The jewel beetles diversity increased rapidly during the Cretaceous, as they were the primary consumers of wood, while longhorn beetles (Cerambycidae) were rather rare and their diversity increased only towards the end of the Upper Cretaceous. The first coprophagous beetles have been recorded from the Upper Cretaceous, and are believed to have lived on the excrement of herbivorous dinosaurs, however there is still a discussion, whether the beetles were always tied to mammals during its development. Also, the first species with an adaption of both larvae and adults to the aquatic lifestyle are found. Whirligig beetles (Gyrinidae) were moderately diverse, although other early beetles (i.e., Dytiscidae) were less, with the most widespread being the species of Coptoclavidae, which preyed on aquatic fly larvae.

=== Paleogene ===
There are many fossils of beetles known from this era, though the beetle fauna of the Paleocene is comparatively poorly investigated. In contrast, the knowledge on the Eocene beetle fauna is very good. The reason is the occurrence of fossil insects in amber and clay slate sediments. Amber is fossilized tree resin, that means it consists of fossilized organic compounds, not minerals. Different amber is distinguished by location, age and species of the resin producing plant. For the research on the Oligocene beetle fauna, Baltic and Dominican amber is most important. Even with the insect fossils record in general lacking, the most diverse deposit being from the Fur Formation, Denmark; including giant ants and primitive moths (Noctuidae). The first butterflies are from the Upper Paleogene, while most, like beetles, already had recent genera and species already existed during the Miocene, however, their distribution differed considerably from today's.

=== Neogene ===
The most important sites for beetle fossils of the Neogene are in the warm temperate and to subtropical zones. Many recent genera and species already existed during the Miocene, however, their distribution differed considerably from today's. One of the most important fossil sites for insects of the Pliocene is Willershausen near Göttingen, Germany with excellently preserved beetle fossils of various families (longhorn beetles, weevils, ladybugs and others) as well as representatives of other orders of insects. In the Willershausen clay pit so far 35 genera from 18 beetle families have been recorded, of which six genera are extinct. The Pleistocene beetle fauna is relatively well known, since the composition of the beetle fauna has been used to reconstruct climate conditions in the Rocky Mountains and on Beringia, the former land bridge between Asia and North America.

== Phylogeny ==
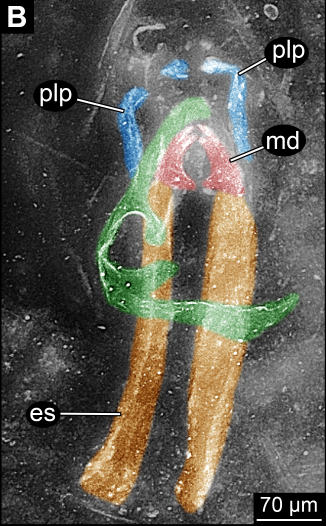
Mandibles of Rhyniognatha hirsti, it may be one of the oldest insects, or a myriapod.

A report in November 2014 unambiguously places the insects in one clade, with the remipedes as the nearest sister clade. This study resolved insect phylogeny of all extant insect orders, and provides "a robust phylogenetic backbone tree and reliable time estimates of insect evolution." Finding strong support for the closest living relatives of the hexapods had proven challenging due to convergent adaptations in a number of arthropod groups for living on land.

- - - Hexapoda (Insecta, Collembola, Diplura, Protura)
    - Crustacea (crabs, shrimp, isopods, etc.)
  - Myriapoda
    - Pauropoda
    - Diplopoda (millipedes)
    - Chilopoda (centipedes)
    - Symphyla
  - Chelicerata
    - Arachnida (spiders, scorpions and allies)
    - Eurypterida (sea scorpions: extinct)
    - Xiphosura (horseshoe crabs)
    - Pycnogonida (sea spiders)
  - Trilobites (extinct)

A phylogenetic tree of the arthropods and related groups

In 2008, researchers at Tufts University uncovered what they believe is the world's oldest known full-body impression of a primitive flying insect, a 300 million-year-old specimen from the Carboniferous Period. Devonian Rhyniognatha hirsti, from the 396 million year old Rhynie chert is known only from mandibles, and considered as the oldest insect. This species already possessed dicondylic mandibles (two articulations in the mandible), a feature associated with winged insects, suggesting that wings may already have evolved at this time. Thus, if Rhyniognatha is actual flying insect, the first insects probably appeared earlier, in the Silurian period. However, this species is also considered as myriapod in later study. There have been four super radiations of insects: beetles (evolved around 300 million years ago), flies (evolved around 250 million years ago), moths and wasps (evolved around 150 million years ago). These four groups account for the majority of described species. The flies and moths along with the fleas evolved from the Mecoptera. The origins of insect flight remain obscure, since the earliest winged insects currently known appear to have been capable fliers. Some extinct insects had an additional pair of winglets attaching to the first segment of the thorax, for a total of three pairs. There is no evidence that suggests that the insects were a particularly successful group of animals before they evolved to have wings.

== Taxonomy ==
- Insects
  - Zygentoma (silverfish)
  - - Odonata (dragonflies and damselflies)
    - - - - Orthoptera (grasshoppers and crickets)
          - Phasmatodea (stick insects)
        - - Blattaria (cockroaches)
          - Isoptera (termites)
      - - Hemiptera (true bugs)
        - - Hymenoptera (ants, bees, and wasps)
          - - Coleoptera (beetles)
            - - Lepidoptera (butterflies and moths)
              - Diptera (flies)

Phylogenetic relationship of some common insect orders: Zygentoma, Odonata, Orthoptera, Phasmatodea, Blattodea, Isoptera, Hemiptera, Hymenoptera, Coleoptera, Lepidoptera, Diptera. No information should be inferred from branch length.

Traditional morphology-based or appearance-based systematics has usually given Hexapoda the rank of superclass, and identified four groups within it: insects (Ectognatha), springtails (Collembola), Protura and Diplura, the latter three being grouped together as Entognatha on the basis of internalized mouth parts. Supraordinal relationships have undergone numerous changes with the advent of methods based on evolutionary history and genetic data. A recent theory is that Hexapoda is polyphyletic (where the last common ancestor was not a member of the group), with the entognath classes having separate evolutionary histories from Insecta. Many of the traditional appearance-based taxa have been shown to be paraphyletic, so rather than using ranks like subclass, superorder and infraorder, it has proved better to use monophyletic groupings (in which the last common ancestor is a member of the group). The following represents the best supported monophyletic groupings for the Insecta.

Insects can be divided into two groups historically treated as subclasses: wingless insects, Apterygota, and winged insects, Pterygota. The Apterygota consist of the primitively wingless order of the silverfish (Thysanura). Archaeognatha make up the Monocondylia based on the shape of their mandibles, while Thysanura and Pterygota are grouped together as Dicondylia. It is possible that the Thysanura themselves are not monophyletic, with the family Lepidotrichidae being a sister group to the Dicondylia (Pterygota and the remaining Thysanura).

Paleoptera and Neoptera are the winged orders of insects differentiated by the presence of hardened body parts called sclerites; also, in Neoptera, muscles that allow their wings to fold flatly over the abdomen. Neoptera can further be divided into incomplete metamorphosis-based (Polyneoptera and Paraneoptera) and complete metamorphosis-based groups. It has proved difficult to clarify the relationships between the orders in Polyneoptera because of constant new findings calling for revision of the taxa. For example, Paraneoptera has turned out to be more closely related to Endopterygota than to the rest of the Exopterygota. The recent molecular finding that the traditional louse orders Mallophaga and Anoplura are derived from within Psocoptera has led to the new taxon Psocodea. Phasmatodea and Embiidina have been suggested to form Eukinolabia. Mantodea, Blattodea and Isoptera are thought to form a monophyletic group termed Dictyoptera.

It is likely that Exopterygota is paraphyletic in regard to Endopterygota. The Neuropterida are often lumped or split on the whims of the taxonomist. Fleas are closely related to boreid mecopterans.

== Evidence ==
=== Phylogenetics ===
Phylogenetics suggests that the first insects may have appeared in the Silurian period and developed wings in the Devonian.

=== Fossils ===
==== Preservation ====
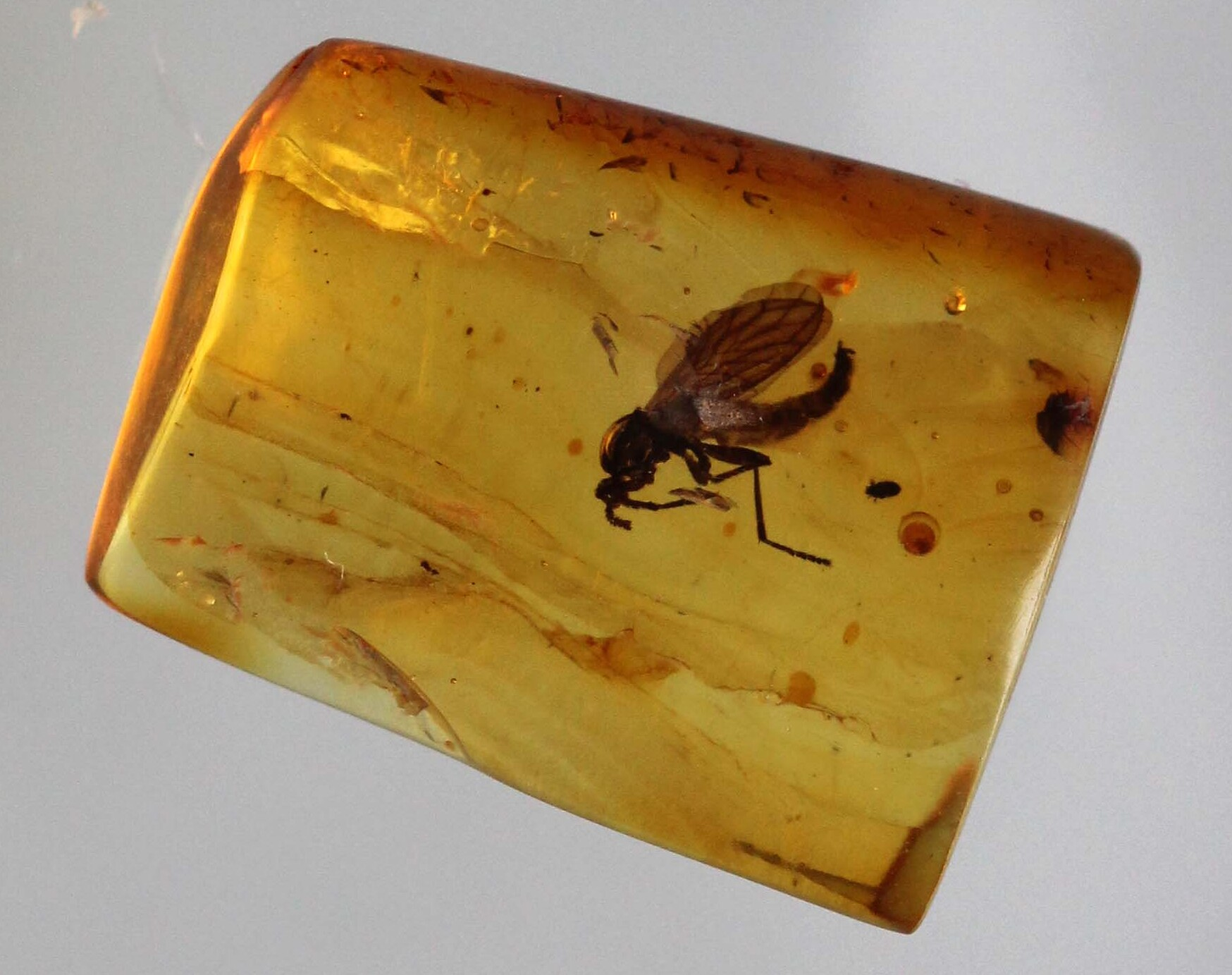
Fossil gnat in amber, a well-preserved insect fossil

Due to their external skeleton, the fossil history of insects is not entirely dependent on lagerstätte type preservation as for many soft-bodied organisms. However, with their small size and light build, insects have not left a particularly robust fossil record. Other than insects preserved in amber, most finds are terrestrial or near terrestrial sources and only preserved under very special conditions such as at the edge of freshwater lakes. While some 1/3 of known non-insect species are extinct fossils, due to the paucity of their fossil record, only 1/100 of known insects are extinct fossils.

Insect fossils are often three dimensional preservations of the original fossil. Loose wings are a common type of fossil as the wings do not readily decay or digest, and are often left behind by predators. Fossilization will often preserve their outer appearance, contrary to vertebrate fossils whom are mostly preserved just as bony remains (or inorganic casts thereof). Due to their size, vertebrate fossils with the external aspect similarly preserved are rare, and most known cases are subfossils. Fossils of insects, when preserved, are often preserved as three-dimensional, permineralized, and charcoalified replicas; and as inclusions in amber and even within some minerals. Sometimes even their colour and patterning is still discernible. Preservation in amber is, however, limited since copious resin production by trees only evolved in the Mesozoic.

There is abundant fossil evidence for the behavior of extinct insects, including feeding damage on fossil vegetation and in wood, fecal pellets, and nests in fossil soils. Such preservation is rare in vertebrates, and is mostly confined to footprints and coprolites.

==== Freshwater and marine insect fossils ====
The common denominator among most deposits of fossil insects and terrestrial plants is the lake environment. Those insects that became preserved were either living in the fossil lake (autochthonous) or carried into it from surrounding habitats by winds, stream currents, or their own flight (allochthonous). Drowning and dying insects not eaten by fish and other predators settle to the bottom, where they may be preserved in the lake's sediments, called lacustrine, under appropriate conditions. Even amber, or fossil resin from trees, requires a watery environment that is lacustrine or brackish in order to be preserved. Without protection in anoxic sediments, amber would gradually disintegrate; it is never found buried in fossil soils. Various factors contribute greatly to what kinds of insects become preserved and how well, if indeed at all, including lake depth, temperature, and alkalinity; type of sediments; whether the lake was surrounded by forest or vast and featureless salt pans; and if it was choked in anoxia or highly oxygenated.

There are some major exceptions to the lacustrine theme of fossil insects, the most famous being the Late Jurassic limestones from Solnhofen and Eichstätt, Germany, which are marine. These deposits are famous for pterosaurs and the bird-like Archaeopteryx. The limestones were formed by a very fine mud of calcite that settled within stagnant, hypersaline bays isolated from inland seas. Most organisms in these limestones, including rare insects, were preserved intact, sometimes with feathers and outlines of soft wing membranes, indicating that there was very little decay. The insects, however, are like casts or molds, having relief but little detail. In some cases iron oxides precipitated around wing veins, revealing better detail.

==== Compressions, impressions and mineralization ====
There are many different ways insects can be fossilized and preserved including compressions and impressions, concretions, mineral replication, charcoalified (fusainized) remains, and their trace remains. Compressions and impressions are the most extensive types of insect fossils, occurring in rocks from the Carboniferous to the Holocene. Impressions are like a cast or mold of a fossil insect, showing its form and even some relief, like pleating in the wings, but usually little or no color from the cuticle. Compressions preserve remains of the cuticle, so color distinguishes structure. In exceptional situations, microscopic features such as microtrichia on sclerites and wing membranes are even visible, but preservation of this scale also requires a matrix of exceptionally fine grain, such as in micritic muds and volcanic tuffs. Because arthropod sclerites are held together by membranes, which readily decompose, many fossil arthropods are known only by isolated sclerites. Far more desirable are complete fossils. Concretions are stones with a fossil at the core whose chemical composition differs from that of the surrounding matrix, usually formed as a result of mineral precipitation from decaying organisms.

A major source (lagerstätte) is the Mazon Creek fossil beds of the Late Carboniferous in Illinois; these are composed of shales and coal seams yielding oblong concretions. Within most concretions is a mold of an animal or plant.

When an insect is partly or wholly replaced by minerals, usually completely articulated and with three-dimensional fidelity, is called mineral replication. This is also called petrifaction, as in petrified wood. Insects preserved this way are often, but not always, preserved as concretions, or within nodules of minerals that formed around the insect as its nucleus. Such deposits generally form where the sediments and water are laden with minerals, and where there is also quick mineralization of the carcass by coats of bacteria.

== See also ==
- Evolution of arthropods
- Evolution of butterflies
- Evolution of spiders
- Insect flight#Evolution
