= Cymatodera wolcotti =

Scientific classification
- Kingdom: Animalia
- Phylum: Arthropoda
- Clade: Pancrustacea
- Class: Insecta
- Order: Coleoptera
- Suborder: Polyphaga
- Infraorder: Cucujiformia
- Family: Cleridae
- Genus: Cymatodera
- Species: C. wolcotti

Binomial name
- Cymatodera wolcotti Barr, 1950

Species of beetle

Cymatodera wolcotti, also known as Wolcott's blister beetle, is a species of checkered beetle in the family Cleridae. It is commonly found in North America. It is named after Albert Burke Wolcott (1869-1950).

== Taxonomy ==
Classification
| Domain | Eukaryota |
| Kingdom | Animalia |
| Phylum | Arthropoda |
| Subphylum | Hexapoda |
| Class | Insecta |
| Order | Coleoptera |
| Suborder | Polyphaga |
| Infraorder | Cucujiformia |
| Superfamily | Cleroidea |
| Family | Cleridae |
| Subfamily | Tillinae |
| Genus | Cymatodera |
| Species | wolcotti |

== Description ==
These beetles are bilaterally symmetric and 9-14 mm in size.

== Habitat and behavior ==
Cleridae beetles are found in different habitats all around the world, like America, Australia, Europe and Middle East. There are approximately 3,500 species in the world and around 500 native to North America. Adults of C. wolcotti have been found on Prunus persica (peach trees), Quercus nigra (water oaks), and in fusiform rust cankers from Pinus elliottii (splash pine) cones.

They can be found feeding on lignicolous insects and pollen around flowers, below tree barks, or on termites and larvae in shrubbery. While the bulk of Adult Cleridae are predaceous, some are scavengers and are found around floral areas.

== Morphology ==
Cymatodera wolcotti exhibits distinct morphological features. The sixth visible ventrite is longer and wider, extending conspicuously past the margins of the sixth tergite. It creates a concave surface with an oblique anterior with a sharp angle at the front, and less pronounced curve at the back. The posterior corners are extended, varying from folded inward to extended backward. In terms of male genitalia, the adaegus is slender with sub triangular sides that curve slightly, and the apex is sharp. The phallic plate has two rows of smal tooth-like projections, that reduce in size towards the end, and phallobasic apodeme is robust distally.

== Life cycle ==
The general life cycle ranges from 35 days to 3 years. These beetles follow a holometabolous life cycle. Temperature is a major deteminant of their life cycle. In warmer climates, the quicker is larval development, and slower in colder ones. Female usually lays 36-72 eggs per batch after copulation. Larvae hatched, are either red or yellow, with flat bodies covered in hair.
