= Cymatodera angustata =

Scientific classification
- Kingdom: Animalia
- Phylum: Arthropoda
- Clade: Pancrustacea
- Class: Insecta
- Order: Coleoptera
- Suborder: Polyphaga
- Infraorder: Cucujiformia
- Family: Cleridae
- Genus: Cymatodera
- Species: C. angustata

Binomial name
- Cymatodera angustata Spinola, 1844

Synonyms
- Cymatodera spinolai Barr, 1950

Species of beetle

Cymatodera angustata is a species of checkered beetle in the family Cleridae. It is found in Central America and North America.

== Taxonomy ==
Full classification
Kingdom	Animalia
Phylum	Arthropoda
Subphylum	Hexapoda
Class	Insecta
Order	Coleoptera
Suborder	Polyphaga
Infraorder	Cucujiformia
Superfamily	Cleroidea
Family	Cleridae
Subfamily	Tillinae
Genus	Cymatodera
Species	C. angustata
