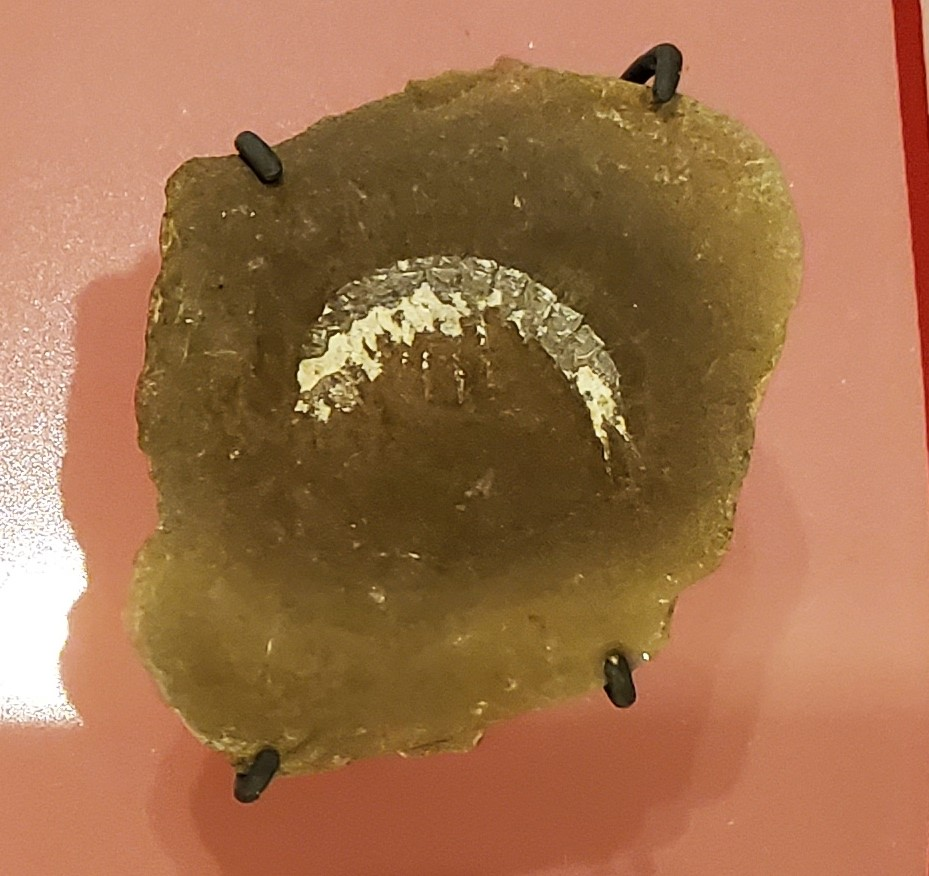
- Dasyleptus sp. fossil
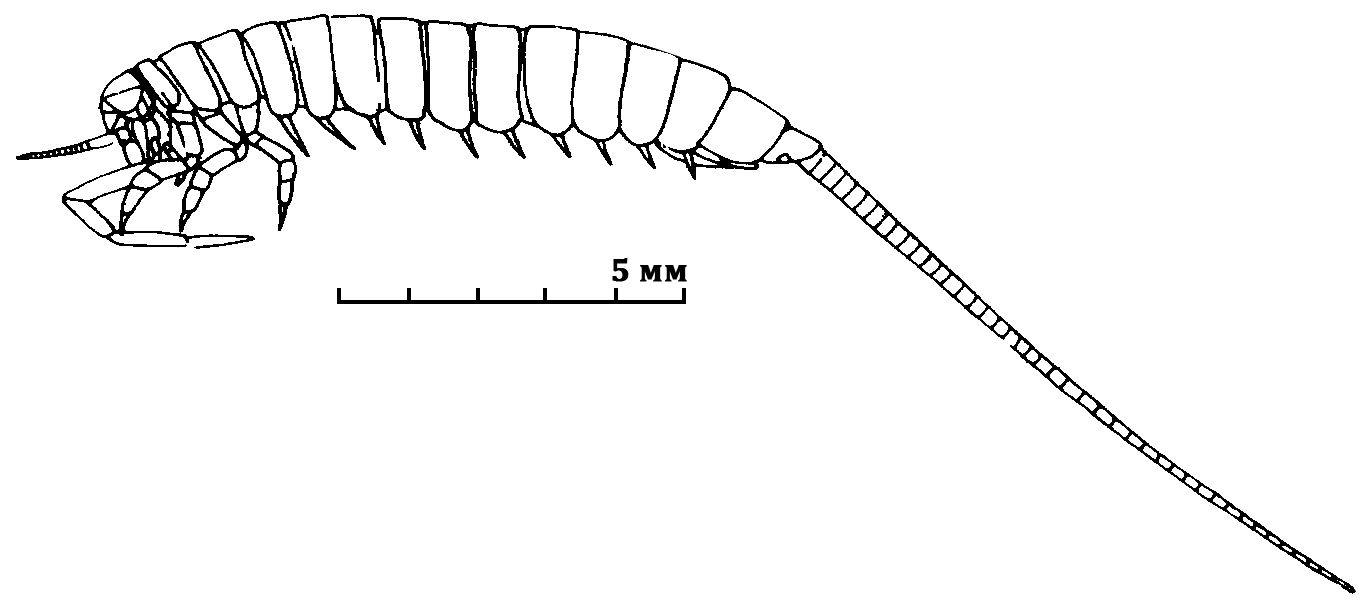
- Life reconstruction of D. brongniarti

Scientific classification
- Kingdom: Animalia
- Phylum: Arthropoda
- Clade: Pancrustacea
- Class: Insecta
- Order: Archaeognatha
- Suborder: †Monura; Sharov, 1957
- Family: †Dasyleptidae; Sharov, 1957
- Genus: †Dasyleptus; Brongniart, 1885

Species
- See text

Synonyms
- Lepidodasypus Durden, 1978

= Dasyleptus =

Dasyleptus Temporal range: Late Carboniferous–Middle Triassic

Extinct genus of insects

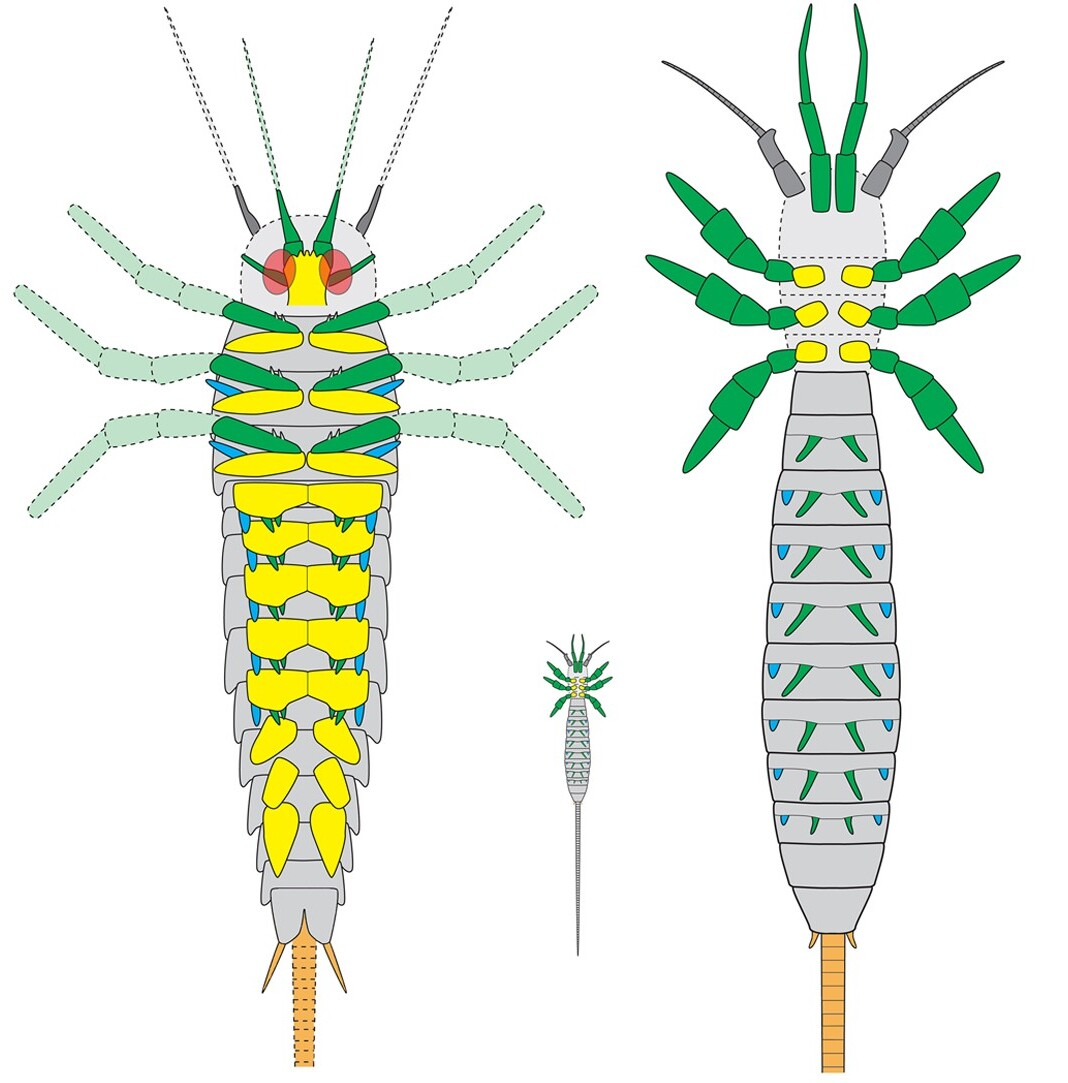
Underside of D. triassicus (right) with telson truncated, compared to early bristletail Gigamachilis (left). Centre shows smaller full body ventral view of D. triassicus

Dasyleptus is an extinct genus of wingless insects, and the only member of the family Dasyleptidae and order or suborder Monura. They resembled juveniles of their modern relatives and had a single lengthy filament projecting from the end of the abdomen. They also had a pair of leg-like cerci and some non-ambulatory abdominal appendages. The largest specimens reached 30 millimetres (1.2 in) or more, not counting the length of the filament. Dasyleptus species are mostly known only from the Late Carboniferous and Permian, but one species recorded from the Middle Triassic indicates that they survived the Permian–Triassic extinction event. Dasyleptus and Monura are now typically treated as members of the living order Archaeognatha, though this placement was questioned in a 2026 study, which found it to be a stem-group insect and the most primitive insect known.

== Taxonomy ==
The genus includes the following species:

- Dasyleptus artinskianus Engel, 2009 – Early Permian (Artinskian), Wellington Formation, Kansas, United States
- Dasyleptus brongniarti Sharov, 1957 – Middle Permian (Roadian), Mitina Formation, Kuznetsk Basin, Russia
- Dasyleptus lucasi Brongniart, 1885 (type species) – Late Carboniferous (Gzhelian), Commentry Shales, France
- Dasyleptus noli Rasnitsyn, 2000 – Late Carboniferous (Gzhelian), Commentry Shales, France
- Dasyleptus rowlandi Rasnitsyn in Rasnitsyn et al., 2004 – Early Permian (Asselian), Bursum Formation, New Mexico, United States
- Dasyleptus sharovi (Durden, 1978) – Early Permian (Artinskian), Wellington Formation, United States
- Dasyleptus sinensis Liu et al., 2021 – Late Permian/Early Triassic, Kayitou Formation, China
- Dasyleptus triassicus Bechly & Stockar, 2011 – Middle Triassic (Ladinian), Meride Limestone, Monte San Giorgio, Switzerland

== Phylogeny ==
Position of Dasyleptus after Tihelka et al. 2026, placing it outside of the Archaeognatha and crown insects as a whole.

- Labiocarida
  - Remipedia
  - Hexapoda
    - Protura
    - - - Diplura
        - Collembola
      - Insecta (total group)
        - †Dasyleptus
        - - †CMNIF 790
          - †CMNIF 2342
          - †Leverhulmia
          - †Chosha
        - Insecta (crown group)
          - Archaeognatha
          - - Zygentoma
            - Pterygota

== See also ==
- Tonganoxichnus, a trace fossil attributed to Monura
