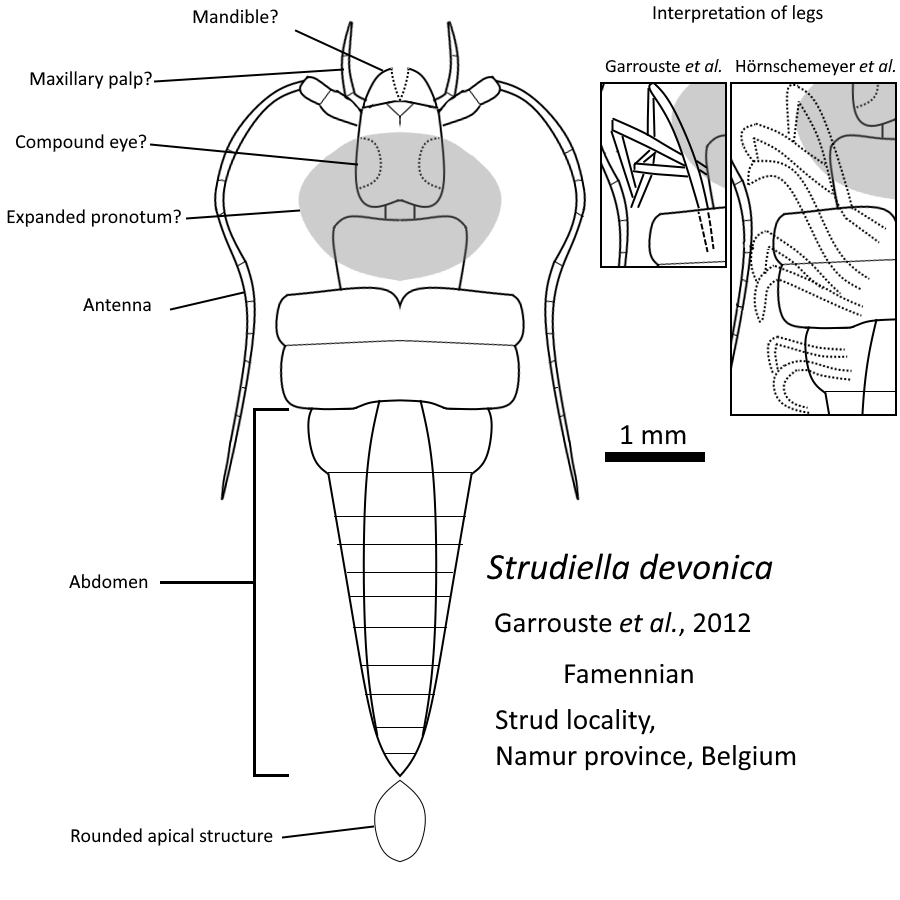
- Interpretation after Garrouste et al. (2012) and Hörnschemeyer et al. (2013)

Scientific classification
- Kingdom: Animalia
- Phylum: Arthropoda
- Class: Insecta
- (unranked): Dicondylia (?)
- Genus: †Strudiella; Garrouste et al., 2012

Type species
- Strudiella devonica Garrouste et al., 2012

= Strudiella =

Strudiella Temporal range: Famennian

Extinct species of arthropod

Strudiella devonica is a species of extinct arthropod from the Devonian. It was recovered in the Strud (Gesves, Belgium) environment from the Bois des Mouches Formation, Upper Famennian. It was originally described as the first complete Late Devonian terrestrial insect, but due to its poor state of preservation, its affinity is discussed.

== Description ==
Strudiella is known from a single specimen. It is a small arthropod with length about 8 mm (0.31 in). Structures like antennae and a number of pairs of legs can be seen. Due to the poorly preserved nature of this fossil, its interpretation and classification depend on the authors.

=== Garrouste et al. (2012) ===
In the first description by Garrouste et al. (2012), it was described as the first complete Devonian insect. The median abdominal structures are filled with guts, which excludes the possibility that is a molting shell. It is interpreted to have 3 pairs of legs from the thorax, the tibiae and femora are long and thin. The antennae are uniramous, the scape and pedicel are wider than the 10-segmented flagellum. The triangular mandibles have a continuous series of sharp, small irregular molar and incisor cusps. Its small head had large eyes. The large thorax had a rounded structure covering its head, corresponding to an expanded pronotum. The abdomen had 10 segments (while a drawing in the paper shows 11 segments), and the authors considered that it lacked any lateral leglets, gills or other appendicular structures. There is a rounded apical structure on the tip of the abdomen. The lack of wings and small size would indicate that it is a nymph. It is interpreted to be a terrestrial insect, and the mandible morphology suggests its diet would be fungivore and/or saprophagy.

=== Hörnschemeyer et al. (2013) ===
However, Hörnschemeyer et al. (2013) questioned its interpretation as an insect. The mandible and its teeth cannot be confirmed, the mandibular teeth would be caused by the idiosyncratic way the rock parted. The eyes are vague, the indication of eye rims by Garrouste et al. is considered as arbitrary. The scape, pedicel and flagellum on its antennae cannot be confirmed, and the whole antennae is wider than the legs which is highly unusual for insects. The alleged subdivision of the trunk into thorax and abdomen is also questionable. Importantly, over 3 pairs of legs can be observed. This poor state of preservation allows numbers of alternate interpretations like a decayed crustacean.

=== Garrouste et al. (2013) ===
In the same volume of Nature, Garrouste et al. replied to Hörnschemeyer et al. (2013). They supported mandibular teeth structure again. They argued that visible maxillary palps are abnormal under the crustacean hypothesis. They considered that scape, pedicel and flagellum can be confirmed from width of antennae, and antennae being wider than legs would not deny insect affinity. For the extra legs that Hörnschemeyer et al. confirmed, they considered as internal organs extruded during compression and decay.

=== Other studies ===
Multiple later studies about Strud fossils call Strudiella as "putative insect". Haug and Haug (2017) listed presumed Devonian insect fossils, and commented that "Its very incomplete preservation makes its interpretation problematic".

== Importance of discovery ==
The discovery of Strudiella as a Devonian insect reduces a previous gap of 45 million years in the evolutionary history of insects, part of the arthropod gap (the 'gap' still occurs in the early Carboniferous, coinciding and extending past the Romer's gap for tetrapods, which may have been caused by low oxygen levels in the atmosphere). However, Hörnschemeyer et al. (2013) which denied its interpretation as insect commented that it is crucial to prevent this fossil from entering entomology textbooks. Most of fossil records of Devonian insects like Rhyniognatha or Leverhulmia are questionable, and the early fossil records of insects still remains scarce and problematic.

== See also ==
- Evolution of insects
