= Cymatodera fuchsii =

Scientific classification
- Domain: Eukaryota
- Kingdom: Animalia
- Phylum: Arthropoda
- Class: Insecta
- Order: Coleoptera
- Suborder: Polyphaga
- Infraorder: Cucujiformia
- Family: Cleridae
- Genus: Cymatodera
- Species: C. fuchsii

Binomial name
- Cymatodera fuchsii Schaeffer, 1904

Synonyms
- Cymatodera comans Wolcott, 1910

Species of beetle

Cymatodera fuchsii is a species of checkered beetle in the family Cleridae. It is found in Central America and North America.
