= Tonganoxichnus =

Tonganoxichnus Temporal range: Pennsylvanian–Permian

Trace fossil classification
- Ichnogenus: †Tonganoxichnus; Mángano et al. 1997

Type ichnospecies
- Tonganoxichnus buildexensis Mángano et al. 1997

Ichnospecies
- T. attleboroensis Benner, Knecht, & Engel, 2015; T. buildexensis Mángano et al. 1997; T. robledoensis Braddy and Briggs 2002

Ichnogenus of trace fossil

Tonganoxichnus (‘Tonganoxie, Kansas trace’) is an ichnogenus of Pennsylvanian to Permian trace fossils that have been found in North America. Tonganoxichnus traces are generally interpreted as being made by monurans, an extinct group of insects that are recognised as a suborder of Archaeognatha.

The ichnogenus originally included two ichnospecies found in close association, T. buildexensis and T. ottawensis. T. buildexensis is interpreted as the resting trace of a primitive insect, often preserving the outline of the insect's underside in great detail. T. ottawensis is interpreted as a jumping trace, likely of the same kind of insect, and provides evidence of jumping as an important form of locomotion in the earliest insects. The trace fossils are found in beds typical of the inner freshwater reaches of estuaries but subject to tides. This provides evidence of the environment in which the first insects evolved.

A 2015 revision of Tonganoxichnus transferred T. ottawensis to a new ichnogenus Cardinichnus, recognising that the ichnospecies represented behaviour distinct from that seen in Tonganoxichnus traces.
