= Leverhulmia =

Leverhulmia Temporal range: Early Devonian, 410–405 Ma

Scientific classification
- Kingdom: Animalia
- Phylum: Arthropoda
- Clade: Pancrustacea
- Subphylum: Hexapoda
- Class: Insecta
- Genus: †Leverhulmia; Anderson and Trewin, 2003
- Species: †L. mariae

Binomial name
- †Leverhulmia mariae Anderson and Trewin, 2003

Extinct genus of stem-group insect

Leverhulmia is an extinct genus of stem-group insect (total-group Ectognatha), known from a single partial specimen with preserved gut contents from the Windyfield chert (associated with the Rhynie chert) of Scotland.

== Description ==
Leverhulmia is an arthropod roughly 1.2 cm (0.47 in) long. The type specimen preserves part of the body with at least five pairs of uniramous limbs (each divided into six podomeres) and an unknown number of segments. The head is not preserved. Initially it was treated as Myriapoda incertae sedis, with possible affinities to Diplopoda or relatives of Kampecaris. Subsequent study of additional material (including thoracic leg segments) indicated a hexapod affinity, possibly near Zygentoma or Archaeognatha.

A 2026 phylogenetic analysis of morphological characters placed Leverhulmia (together with the Late Mississippian Chosha praecursor and two undescribed Mazon Creek fossils) as stem-group insects, sister to crown-group Insecta (Ectognatha). Supporting features include paired claws on the thoracic legs and a medial unguitractor plate, well preserved in Leverhulmia. These fossils retain a plesiomorphic trait relative to crown insects: fully developed, jointed abdominal legs, and lack a subdivided tarsus. Leverhulmia therefore represents the earliest known stem-insect in the fossil record, helping to narrow the long "hexapod gap" between Early Devonian hexapods and the diverse Carboniferous insect fauna.

== Etymology ==
Leverhulmia is named after the Leverhulme Trust, for "the generosity of the Leverhulme Trust which supported this phase of exploration of the Rhynie and Windyfield cherts". Its specific name, mariae, honours Mary Duncan of Windyfield Farm, on whose land the Windyfield cherts occur.

== Ecology ==
Preserved gut contents include macerated plant tissue, embryophyte and fungal spores, and fragments of arthropod cuticle, indicating a detritivorous diet. Unlike the later stem-group insect Chosha, Leverhulmia lacks paddle-like modifications of the abdominal appendages and is interpreted as fully terrestrial, consistent with other members of the Windyfield chert fauna.

== Phylogeny ==
In phylogenetic analyses Leverhulmia, Chosha, and the Mazon Creek specimens form an unresolved clade of stem-group insects outside crown Ectognatha. This taxa share apomorphies of Insecta (like paired claws, unguitractor plate, and in some taxa an ovipositor and terminal filament) while retaining jointed abdominal legs. Their morphology illuminates the transition from multi-legged crustacean-like ancestors to the six-legged body plan of crown insects and supports an Early Devonian origin for the insect lineage.

Cladogram after Tihelka et al. 2026.

- Labiocarida
  - Remipedia
  - Hexapoda
    - Protura
    - - - Diplura
        - Collembola
      - Insecta (total group)
        - †Dasyleptus
        - - †CMNIF 790
          - †CMNIF 2342
          - †Leverhulmia
          - †Chosha
        - Insecta (crown group)
          - Archaeognatha
          - - Zygentoma
            - Pterygota

== See also ==
- Evolution of insects
