= Cymatodera delicatula =

Scientific classification
- Domain: Eukaryota
- Kingdom: Animalia
- Phylum: Arthropoda
- Class: Insecta
- Order: Coleoptera
- Suborder: Polyphaga
- Infraorder: Cucujiformia
- Family: Cleridae
- Genus: Cymatodera
- Species: C. delicatula

Binomial name
- Cymatodera delicatula Fall, 1906

Species of beetle

Cymatodera delicatula is a species of checkered beetle in the family Cleridae. It is found in Central America and North America.
