= Cymatodera antennata =

Scientific classification
- Domain: Eukaryota
- Kingdom: Animalia
- Phylum: Arthropoda
- Class: Insecta
- Order: Coleoptera
- Suborder: Polyphaga
- Infraorder: Cucujiformia
- Family: Cleridae
- Genus: Cymatodera
- Species: C. antennata

Binomial name
- Cymatodera antennata Schaeffer, 1908

Synonyms
- Cymatodera soror Wolcott, 1910; Cymatodera torosa Wolcott, 1910

Species of beetle

Cymatodera antennata is a species of checkered beetle in the family Cleridae. It is found in North America.
