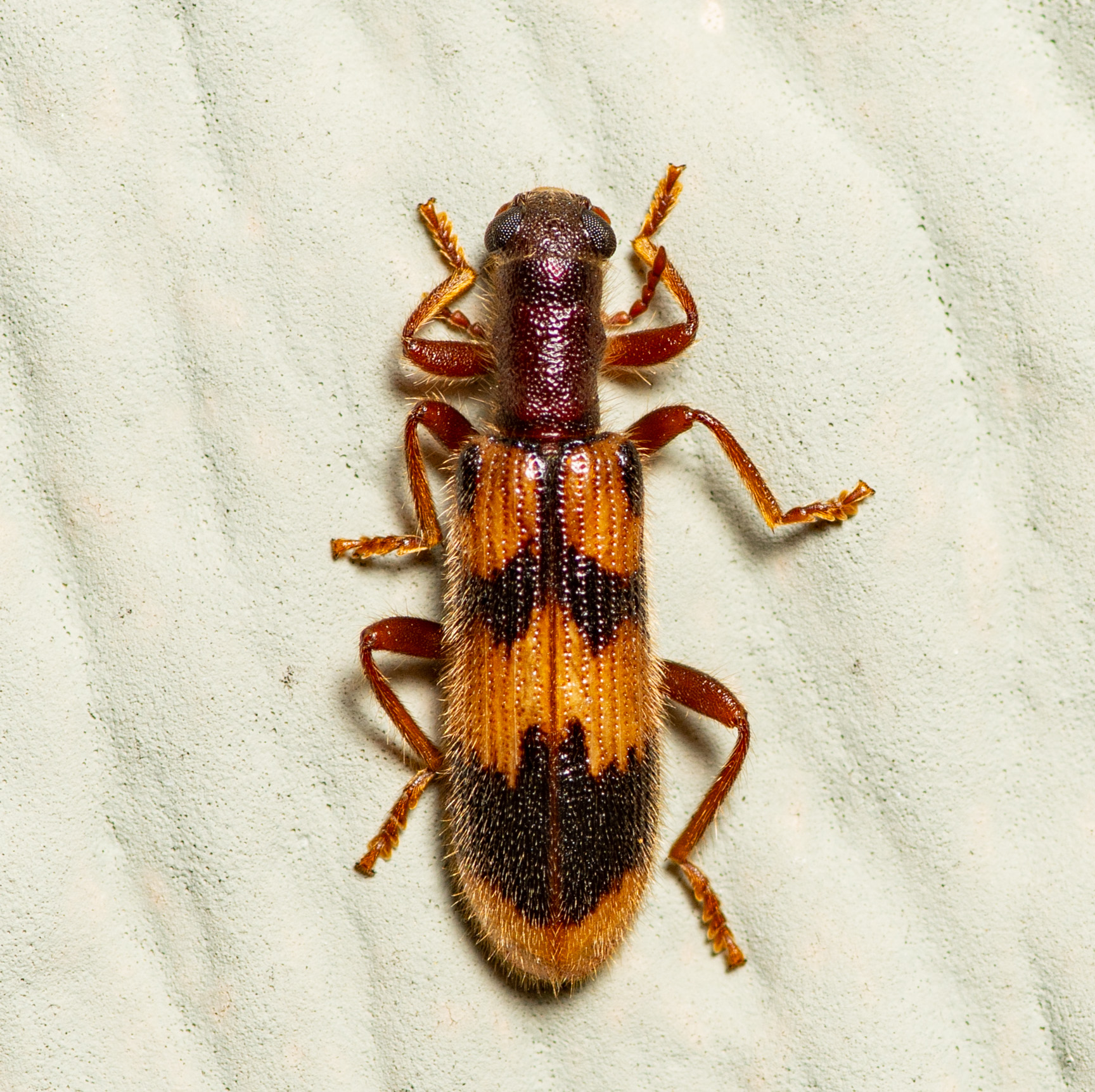

Scientific classification
- Domain: Eukaryota
- Kingdom: Animalia
- Phylum: Arthropoda
- Class: Insecta
- Order: Coleoptera
- Suborder: Polyphaga
- Infraorder: Cucujiformia
- Family: Cleridae
- Genus: Cymatodera
- Species: C. sirpata

Binomial name
- Cymatodera sirpata Horn, 1885

= Cymatodera sirpata =

Species of beetle

Cymatodera sirpata is a species of checkered beetle in the family Cleridae. It is found in North America.
