= Cymatodera hurdi =

Scientific classification
- Kingdom: Animalia
- Phylum: Arthropoda
- Class: Insecta
- Order: Coleoptera
- Suborder: Polyphaga
- Infraorder: Cucujiformia
- Family: Cleridae
- Genus: Cymatodera
- Species: C. hurdi

Binomial name
- Cymatodera hurdi Barr, 1972

Species of beetle

Cymatodera hurdi is a species in the family Cleridae (checkered beetles), in the order Coleoptera (beetles). The distribution range of Cymatodera hurdi includes Central America and North America.
