= Arthropod gap =

Gap in evolutionary biology

The arthropod gap, also sometimes known as the hexapoda gap, is an apparent gap in the fossil record of terrestrial arthropods (particularly insects) during the early Carboniferous period. The fossil gap, noted in the study of evolutionary biology, coincides and extends past the Romer's gap for tetrapod vertebrates, who were newly arrived colonizers of land habitats.

The discovery of the Devonian insect species Strudiella devonica in 2012, and dated to 370 million years ago, reduces a previous gap of 45 million years in the evolutionary history of insects, from 385 million to 325 million years ago. However, its affinity as an insect is questioned later.

== See also ==
- Evolution of insects
- Romer's gap
- Olson's gap
