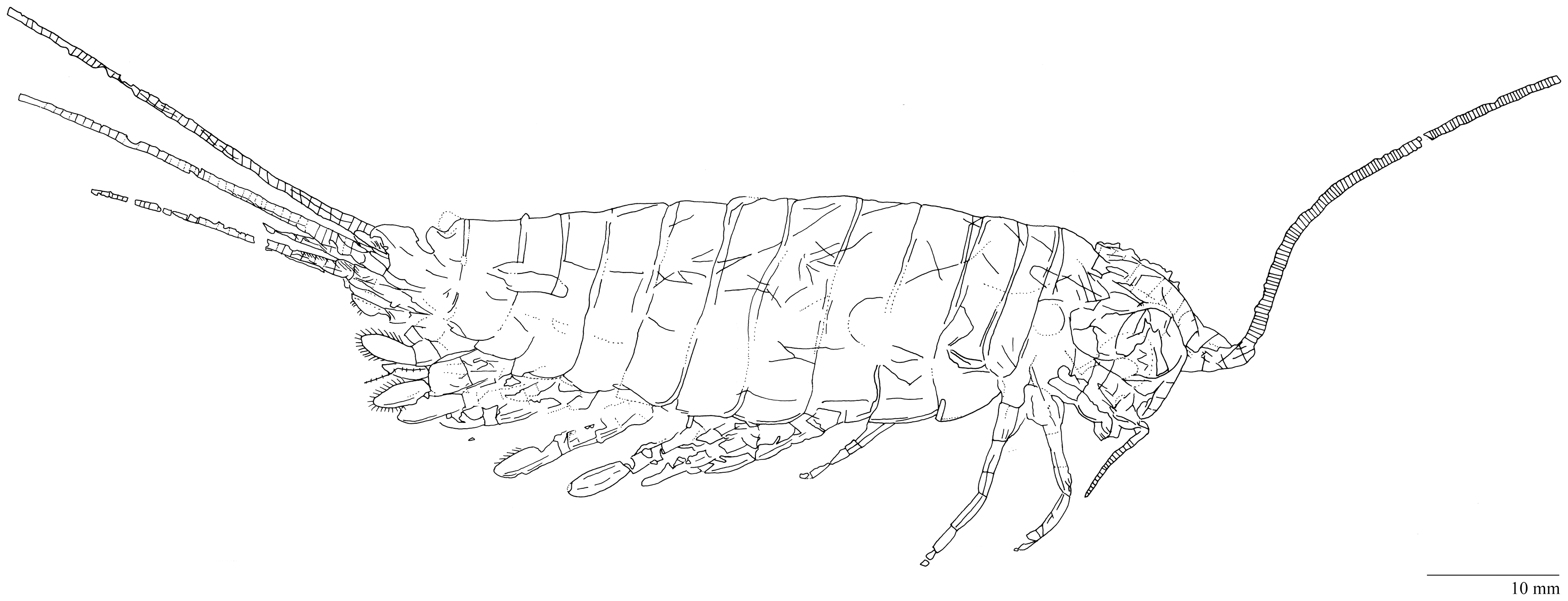
- Obsolete camera lucida drawing of C. praecursor

Scientific classification
- Kingdom: Animalia
- Phylum: Arthropoda
- Clade: Pancrustacea
- Clade: Allotriocarida
- Subphylum: Hexapoda
- Genus: †Chosha; Tihelka et al., 2026
- Species: †C. praecursor

Binomial name
- †Chosha praecursor Tihelka et al., 2026

= Chosha =

Chosha Temporal range: Late Mississipian, 324 Ma

Extinct genus of stem-group insect

Chosha is an extinct genus of stem-group insect known from a single fossil specimen from the Tesnus Formation of Texas, dated to 324 million years ago in the Late Mississippian Epoch. Together with Leverhulmia and other undescribed specimens, Chosha formed a previously unrecognised monophyletic clade of stem-insects.

== Etymology ==
From ch′osh, a Navajo word for insect, "in reference to the Navajo creation myth, wherein the first landmass was occupied by ancient insect-like creatures whose descendants populated the Earth".

== Fossil history ==
The fossil (catalogue number SDNHM 28852) had been found in 1985 by Emerson and Schram and considered a juvenile specimen of the remipedian Tesnusocaris, an interpretation put into doubt in 2011.

== Reinterpretation as an insect ==
Paleoentomologist Erik Tihelka noticed a drawing of the fossil in an old Russian textbook and decided to re-analyze the specimen. In 2026, Tihelka and coworkers published a redescription of the fossil as a stem-insect. Features consistent with Hexapoda are the uniramous antennae, a thorax with three segments and an abdomen with 11, and the legs consisting of six podites. The specimen is a female as shown by the presence of an ovipositor, another feature unique to insects. The presence of gills and abdominal paddle-like appendages suggest a semiaquatic way of life.

== Phylogeny ==
Cladogram after Tihelka et al. 2026, showing Chosha's position in an unnamed monophyletic insect stem clade together with Leverhulmia and two yet undescribed specimens from the Mazon Creek. The stem clade is in a polytomy with the crown insects and Dasyleptus, while its own internal relationships also remain a polytomy. This taxa share apomorphies of Insecta (like paired claws, unguitractor plate, and in some taxa an ovipositor and terminal filament) while retaining jointed abdominal legs. This morphology illuminates the transition from multi-legged crustacean-like ancestors to the six-legged body plan of crown insects and supports an Early Devonian origin for the insect lineage.

- Labiocarida
  - Remipedia
  - Hexapoda
    - Protura
    - - - Diplura
        - Collembola
      - Insecta (total group)
        - †Dasyleptus
        - - †CMNIF 790
          - †CMNIF 2342
          - †Leverhulmia
          - †Chosha
        - Insecta (crown group)
          - Archaeognatha
          - - Zygentoma
            - Pterygota

== See also ==
- Evolution of insects
