= Cymatodera inornata =

Scientific classification
- Domain: Eukaryota
- Kingdom: Animalia
- Phylum: Arthropoda
- Class: Insecta
- Order: Coleoptera
- Suborder: Polyphaga
- Infraorder: Cucujiformia
- Family: Cleridae
- Genus: Cymatodera
- Species: C. inornata

Binomial name
- Cymatodera inornata (Say, 1835)

Species of beetle

Cymatodera inornata, the inornate checkered beetle, is a species of checkered beetle in the family Cleridae. It is found in North America.
