= Cymatodera californica =

Scientific classification
- Domain: Eukaryota
- Kingdom: Animalia
- Phylum: Arthropoda
- Class: Insecta
- Order: Coleoptera
- Suborder: Polyphaga
- Infraorder: Cucujiformia
- Family: Cleridae
- Genus: Cymatodera
- Species: C. californica

Binomial name
- Cymatodera californica Horn, 1868

Synonyms
- Cymatodera rufiventris Wolcott, 1927

Species of beetle

Cymatodera californica is a species of checkered beetle in the family Cleridae. It is found in Central America and North America.
