= Cymatodera oblita =

Scientific classification
- Domain: Eukaryota
- Kingdom: Animalia
- Phylum: Arthropoda
- Class: Insecta
- Order: Coleoptera
- Suborder: Polyphaga
- Infraorder: Cucujiformia
- Family: Cleridae
- Genus: Cymatodera
- Species: C. oblita

Binomial name
- Cymatodera oblita Horn, 1876

Synonyms
- Cymatodera cognata Wolcott, 1910; Cymatodera umbrina Fall, 1906

Species of beetle

Cymatodera oblita is a species of checkered beetle in the family Cleridae. It is found in North America.
