= Cymatodera fuscula =

Scientific classification
- Domain: Eukaryota
- Kingdom: Animalia
- Phylum: Arthropoda
- Class: Insecta
- Order: Coleoptera
- Suborder: Polyphaga
- Infraorder: Cucujiformia
- Family: Cleridae
- Genus: Cymatodera
- Species: C. fuscula

Binomial name
- Cymatodera fuscula LeConte, 1852

Synonyms
- Cymatodera mitis Wolcott, 1921

Species of beetle

Cymatodera fuscula is a species of checkered beetle in the family Cleridae. It is found in Central America and North America.
