= Cymatodera balteata =

Banded checkered beetle

Scientific classification
- Domain: Eukaryota
- Kingdom: Animalia
- Phylum: Arthropoda
- Class: Insecta
- Order: Coleoptera
- Suborder: Polyphaga
- Infraorder: Cucujiformia
- Family: Cleridae
- Genus: Cymatodera
- Species: C. balteata

Binomial name
- Cymatodera balteata LeConte, 1854

Species of beetle

Cymatodera balteata, known as the banded checkered beetle, is a species of checkered beetle in the family Cleridae. It is found in both Central America and North America.
