= Cymatodera vandykei =

Scientific classification
- Domain: Eukaryota
- Kingdom: Animalia
- Phylum: Arthropoda
- Class: Insecta
- Order: Coleoptera
- Suborder: Polyphaga
- Infraorder: Cucujiformia
- Family: Cleridae
- Genus: Cymatodera
- Species: C. vandykei

Binomial name
- Cymatodera vandykei Schaeffer, 1904

Species of beetle

Cymatodera vandykei is a species of checkered beetles in the family Cleridae. It is found in North America.
