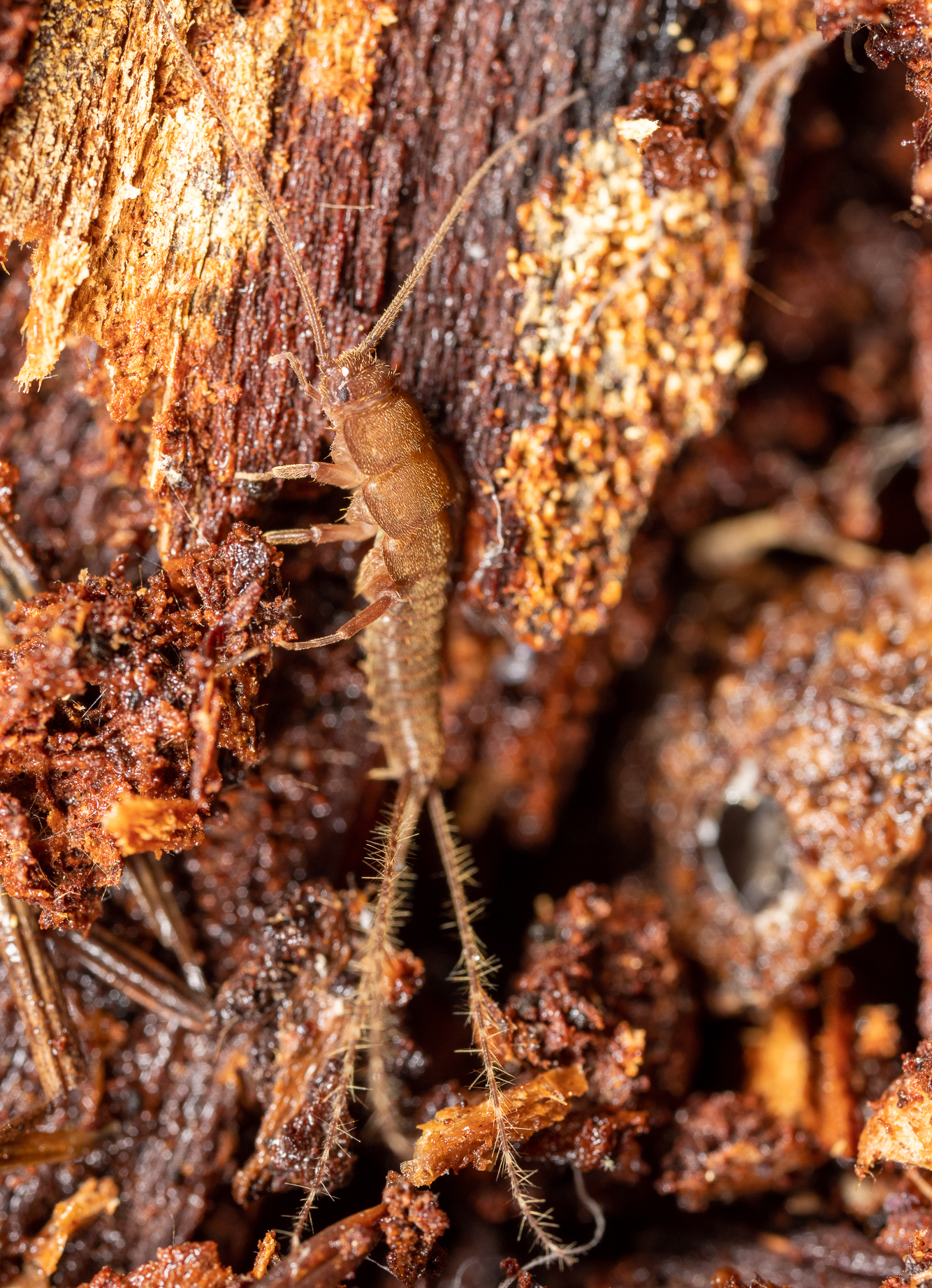
- Specimen seen near Cazadero, California

Scientific classification
- Kingdom: Animalia
- Phylum: Arthropoda
- Clade: Pancrustacea
- Class: Insecta
- Order: Zygentoma
- Family: Lepidotrichidae
- Genus: Tricholepidion; Wygodzinsky, 1961
- Species: T. gertschi

Binomial name
- Tricholepidion gertschi Wygodzinsky, 1961

= Tricholepidion =

Species of silverfish

Tricholepidion is a genus of wingless insect belonging to Zygentoma (silverfish and allies), with only a single described species T. gertschi, native to the northern coast of California in Western North America. It lives under dead bark and in rotting wood of conifers in mesophytic forests. It is alternatively considered the only living member of the family Lepidotrichidae, which also includes Lepidotrix from Eocene aged European amber, or the only member of the family Tricholepidiidae. The taxonomic position of Tricholepidion is uncertain, in some molecular phylogenetics studies it has been recovered as less closely related to flying insects (Pterygota) than the rest of Zygentoma is, rendering Zygentoma paraphyletic. Members of the species are 7–18 millimetres (0.28–0.71 in) in length, with a reddish-brown body colour. Each compound eye contains ~40 ommatidia, and they have three ocelli. Scales on the body are absent. Unlike Archaeognatha and the other families of Zygentoma, which have three- and sometimes two-segmented tarsi on the legs, they have five-segmented tarsi like many winged insects, with the legs having a 5-5-5 tarsal formula. As T. gertschi is the only member of its family still extant, it is considered to be a "living fossil".
