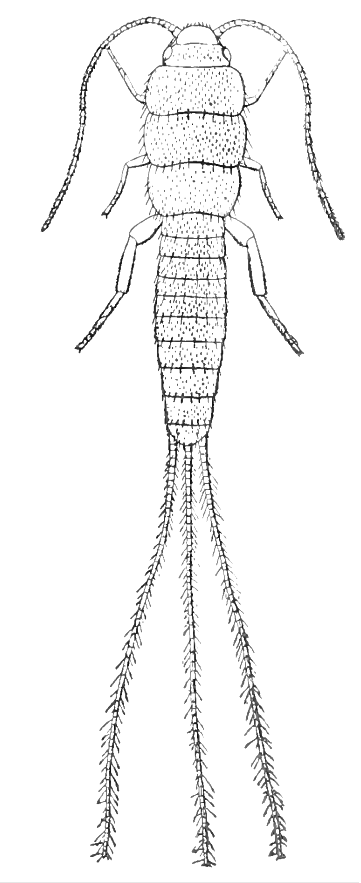

Scientific classification
- Domain: Eukaryota
- Kingdom: Animalia
- Phylum: Arthropoda
- Class: Insecta
- Order: Zygentoma
- Family: Lepidotrichidae
- Genus: †Lepidotrix; Menge, 1854
- Species: †L. piliferum

Binomial name
- †Lepidotrix piliferum Menge, 1854

= Lepidotrix =

Lepidotrix Temporal range: Priabonian

Extinct species of silverfish

Lepidotrix is an extinct genus of wingless insect belonging to Zygentoma (silverfish and allies) in the family Lepidotrichidae. There is one described species in Lepidotrix, L. piliferum/pillifera. It is known from specimens found in Eocene aged Baltic amber and Rovno amber. The genus lacks occelli. Its relationship with the extant genus Tricholepidion, which has historically been placed in the same family, is disputed, with some studies finding the two taxa to not be closely related, with Tricholepidion being placed in its own family instead. While often spelled Lepidothrix in historic literature, this is homonymous with a genus of birds, and Lepidotrix was the spelling used in the original publication.
