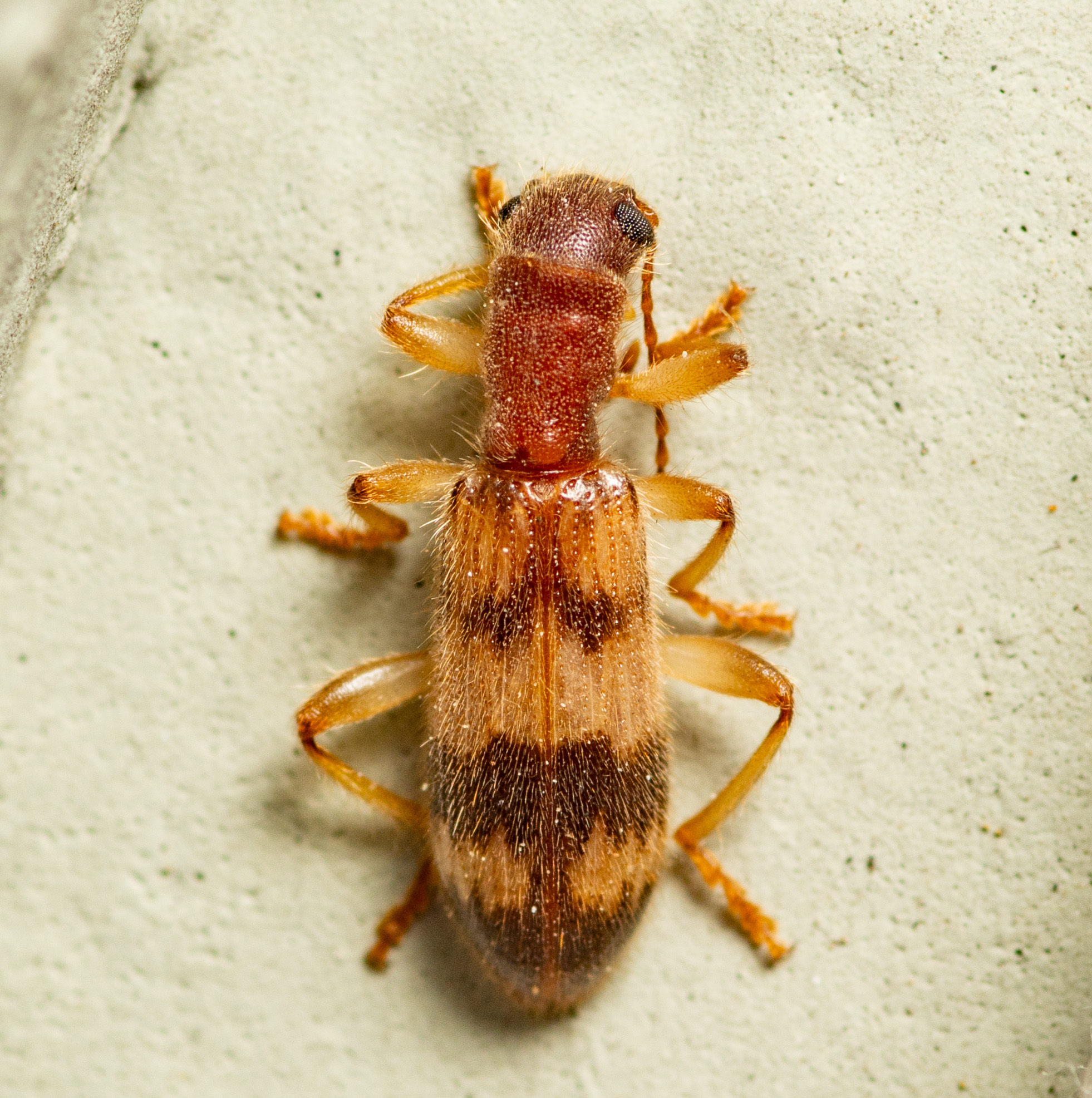

Scientific classification
- Domain: Eukaryota
- Kingdom: Animalia
- Phylum: Arthropoda
- Class: Insecta
- Order: Coleoptera
- Suborder: Polyphaga
- Infraorder: Cucujiformia
- Family: Cleridae
- Genus: Cymatodera
- Species: C. undulata

Binomial name
- Cymatodera undulata (Say, 1825)

= Cymatodera undulata =

Species of beetle

Cymatodera undulata, the undulate checkered beetle, is a species of checkered beetle in the family Cleridae. It is found in North America.
