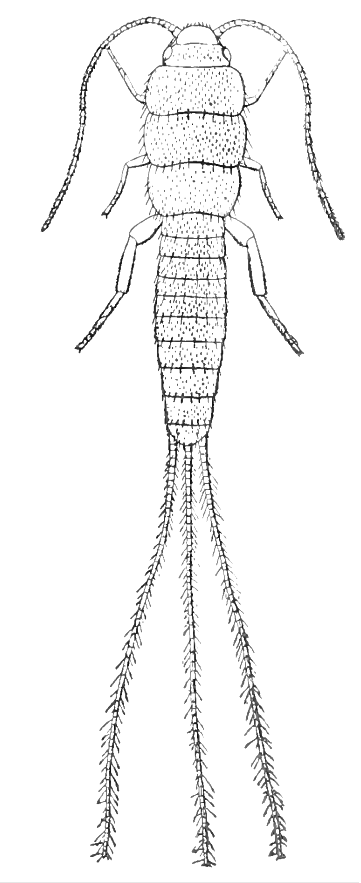
- Drawing of Lepidotrix

Scientific classification
- Domain: Eukaryota
- Kingdom: Animalia
- Phylum: Arthropoda
- Class: Insecta
- Order: Zygentoma
- Family: Lepidotrichidae; Silvestri, 1912

Genera
- †Lepidotrix; Tricholepidion?

= Lepidotrichidae =

Family of silverfishes

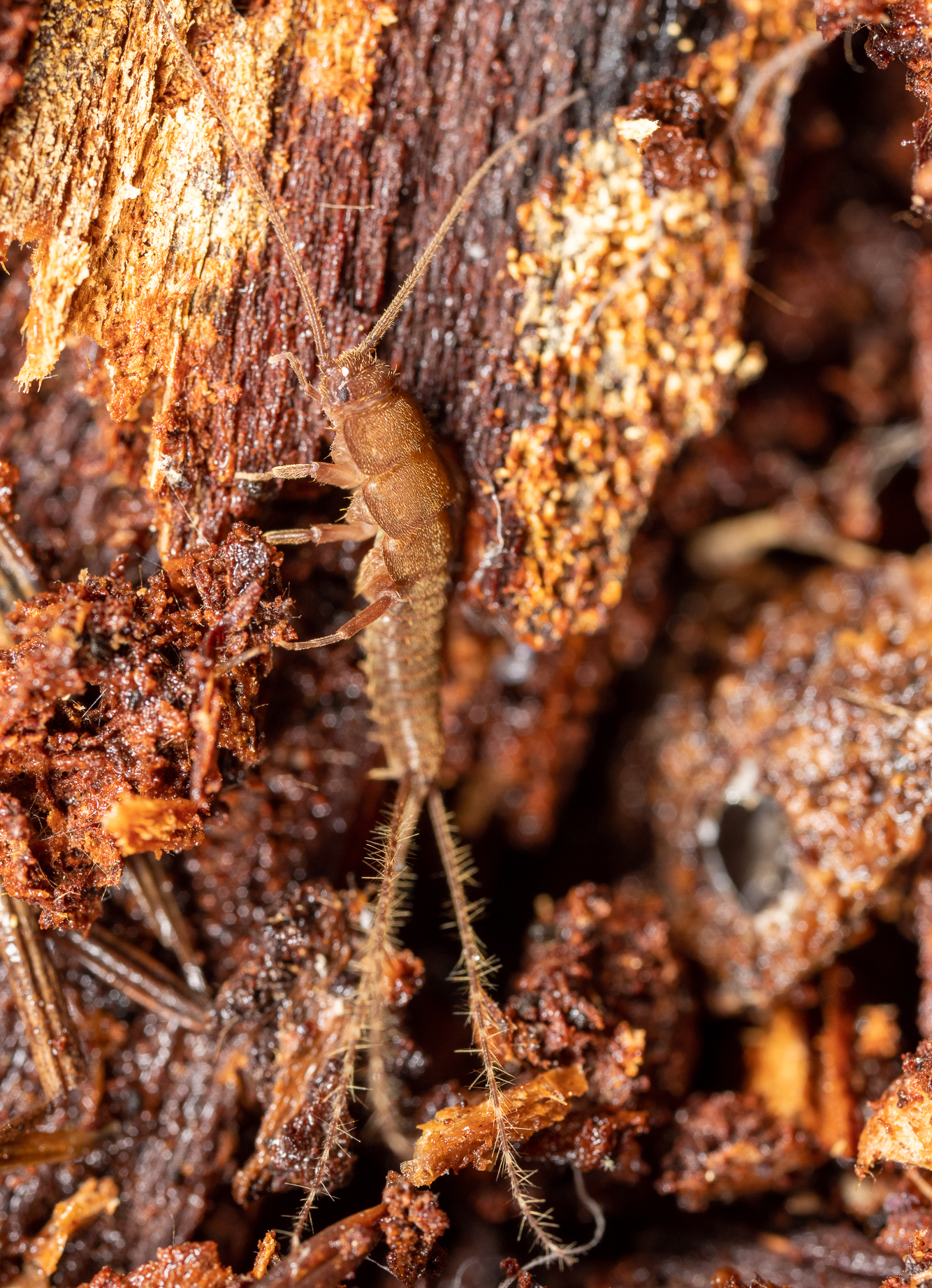
Photo of Tricholepidion, which possibly belongs to this family

Lepidotrichidae is a family of basal insects belonging to the order Zygentoma (silverfish and allies). The family contains the extinct Lepidotrix, known from specimens preserved in Eocene-aged European amber. The extant genus Tricholepidion, which contains a single species, Tricholepidion gertschi from western North America, has also been typically considered a member of the family. However, more recent research suggests that the two genera are not particularly closely related, and Tricholepidion should instead be assigned to its own family Tricholepidiidae.
