= Evolution of butterflies =

Origin and diversification of butterflies through geologic time

Butterfly evolution is the origin and diversification of butterflies through geologic time and over a large portion of the Earth's surface. The earliest known butterfly fossils are from the mid Eocene epoch, between 40 and 50 million years ago. Their development is closely linked to the evolution of flowering plants, since both adult butterflies and caterpillars feed on flowering plants. Of the 220,000 species of Lepidoptera, about 45,000 species are butterflies, which probably evolved from moths. Butterflies are found throughout the world, except in Antarctica, and are especially numerous in the tropics; they fall into eight different families.

== Phylogeny ==
The butterflies form the clade Rhopalocera, which is composed of three superfamilies: Hedyloidea (the moth butterfly family Hedylidae), the Hesperioidea (the skipper family Hesperiidae), and the Papilionoidea (the true butterfly families Papilionidae, Pieridae, Nymphalidae, Lycaenidae, and Riodinidae). All of these families are monophyletic. The Hedyloidea is the sister group to the other two superfamilies. Within the Papilionoidea, Papilionidae is the sister group to the other families, and Pieridae is the sister group to (Nymphalidae+(Lycaenidae+Riodinidae)). Phylogenetic hypotheses within the Nymphalidae are still under discussion. Current research is concentrated on subfamilial and tribal relationships, especially in the Nymphalidae.

- Rhopalocera
  - Hedylidae (position uncertain)
  - - Hesperioidea
      Hesperiidae
    - Papilionoidea
      - Papilionidae
      - - Pieridae
        - - Nymphalidae
          - - Lycaenidae
            - Riodinidae

Phylogenetic relationships of butterfly families

== Lines of evidence ==
The modern study of butterflies' higher classification began with Ehrlich's phenetic use of hundreds of previously overlooked morphological characters in tabular form, across families and major groups. Scoble (1995) and others continued the search for new characters, but with their application to cladism. Larval characters are now commonly integrated with those from adult butterflies. The addition of molecular data has allowed researchers to resolve clades in many lineages.

Evidence is gleaned from paleontology where some 50 butterfly fossils have been identified, from morphology and the study of homologies, from molecular genetics and comparative biochemistry, from comparative ethology, and from present-day geographical distributions and ecology. Even though butterflies are among the most studied insects, new findings are coming to light almost every month, and the prospect of a stable butterfly classification based on strongly supported clades is seemingly within reach.

=== Fossils ===
Butterfly fossils have been well covered by Grimaldi & Engel (2005), who point out their weakness in resolving the sister group of the Rhopalocera: butterflies of 45 Mya are much like their living counterparts. The first fossil was formed around 40–50 million years ago.

=== Host plants ===
Some species in the Satyrinae use ferns as larval host plants, and it is not impossible that the butterflies could have originated before their present-day angiosperm plant hosts. Evidence from the historical diversification of fifteen butterfly groups that show an increase in the diversification rates that follow major host shifts.

== Date of origin ==
Some researchers theorize that butterflies most likely originated in the Cretaceous period when the continents were arrayed differently from their present positions and with climates unlike those of today. That is when the major angiosperm radiation took place. Thus, butterfly evolution must be studied throughout the elaboration and testing of phylogenetic hypotheses and through historical zoogeography. Researchers who accept a Cretaceous origin for the butterflies generally favor vicariant zoogeographic hypothesis for how the major lineages of butterflies came to be distributed over the world, whereas those who favor a Tertiary age rely on dispersalist hypotheses.

== Drivers of speciation ==
Mimicry, hybridization, and co-evolution with host plants have probably contributed to speciation in the butterflies.
