= Ellipura =

Scientific classification
- Kingdom: Animalia
- Phylum: Arthropoda
- Class: Entognatha
- Subclass: Ellipura

Orders
- Protura; Collembola

Subclass of wingless arthropods

Ellipura is a proposed subclass containing the orders Protura and Collembola.
