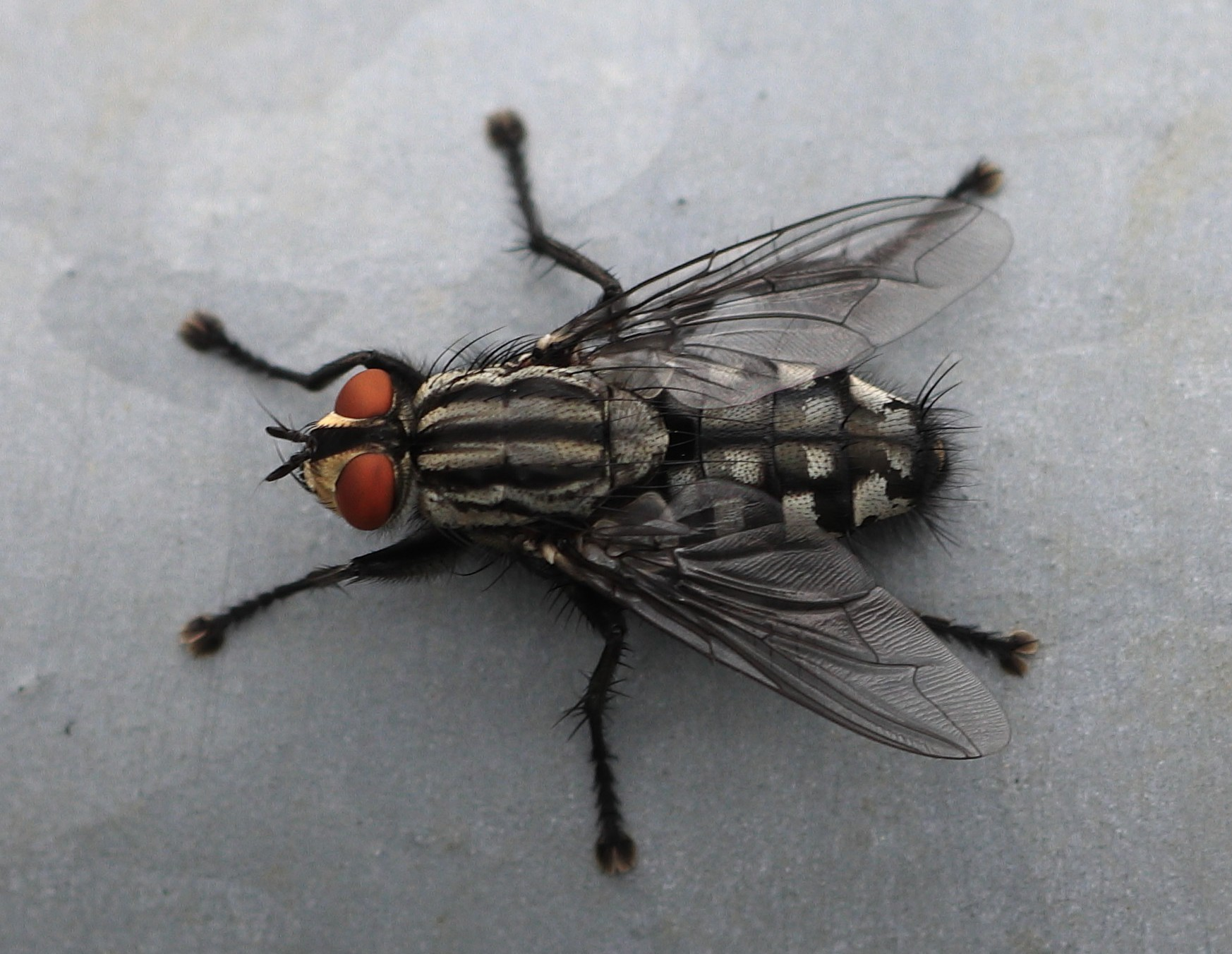
- A flesh-fly, Sarcophaga sp.
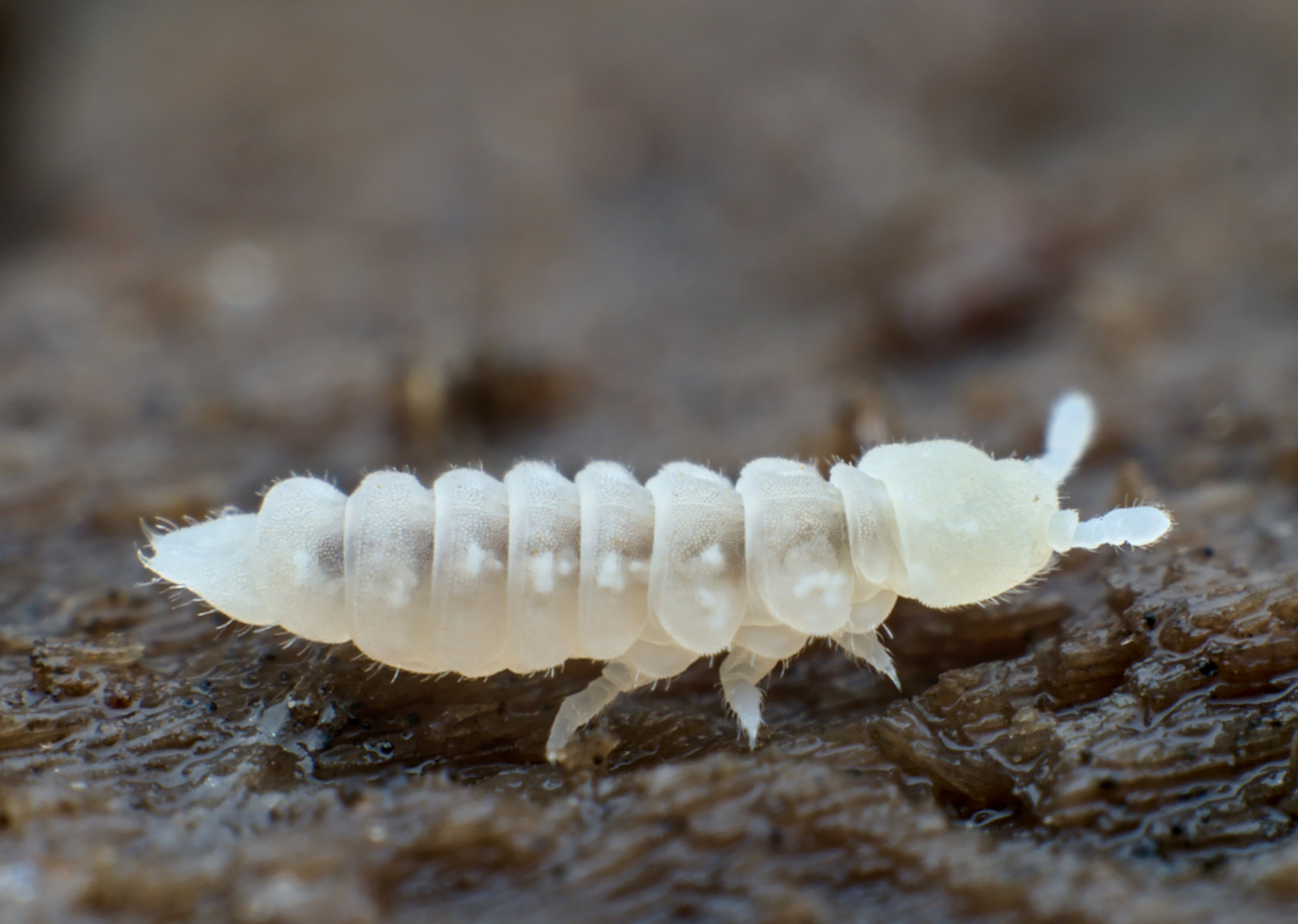
- A springtail, Kalaphorura burmeisteri

Scientific classification
- Kingdom: Animalia
- Phylum: Arthropoda
- Clade: Pancrustacea
- Clade: Allotriocarida
- Subphylum: Hexapoda; Blainville, 1816

Classes
- Clade Ellipura; Class Collembola (springtails); Order Protura (coneheads); Clade Cercophora; Order Diplura (two-pronged bristletails); Class Insecta (insects); incertae sedis; Chosha; unnamed mazon creek fossil {{Citation needed|date=September 2026}} (Insect?); See text for alternative relationships.

= Hexapoda =

Hexapods Temporal range: Early Devonian - present, 411–0 Ma

Subphylum of arthropods

The subphylum Hexapoda (from Greek for 'six legs') or hexapods comprises the largest clade of arthropods and includes most of the extant arthropod species. It includes the crown group class Insecta (true insects), as well as the much smaller group Entognatha, which includes three classes of wingless arthropods that were once considered insects: Collembola (springtails), Protura (coneheads) and Diplura (two-pronged bristletails). The insects and springtails are very abundant and are some of the most important pollinators, basal consumers, scavengers/detritivores and micropredators in terrestrial environments.

Hexapods are named for their most distinctive feature: a three-part body plan with a consolidated thorax and three pairs of legs. Most other arthropods have more than three pairs of legs. Most recent studies have recovered Hexapoda as a subgroup of Pancrustacea as members of Allotriocarida.

== Morphology ==
Hexapods have bodies ranging in length from 0.5 mm to over 300 mm which are divided into an anterior head, thorax, and posterior abdomen. The head is composed of a presegmental acron that usually bears eyes (absent in Protura and Diplura), followed by six segments, all closely fused together, with the following appendages:

Segment I. None
Segment II. Antennae (sensory), absent in Protura
Segment III. None
Segment IV. Mandibles (crushing jaws)
Segment V. Maxillae (chewing jaws)
Segment VI. Labium (lower lip)

The mouth lies between the fourth and fifth segments and is covered by a projection from the sixth, called the labrum (upper lip). In true insects (class Insecta) the mouthparts are exposed or ectognathous, while in other groups they are enveloped or endognathous. Similar appendages are found on the heads of Myriapoda and Crustacea, although the crustaceans have secondary antennae.

Collembola and Diplura have segmented antenna: each segment has its own set of muscles. The antennae of insects consist of just three segments: the scape, the pedicel and the flagellum. Muscles occur only in the first two segments. The third segment, the flagellum, has no muscles and is composed of a various number of annuli. This type of antenna is therefore called an annulated antenna. Johnston's organ, which is found on the pedicel, is absent in the Entognatha.

The thorax is composed of three segments, each of which bears a single pair of legs. As is typical of arthropods adapted to life on land, each leg has a single walking branch composed of five segments. The legs do not have the gill branches found in some other arthropods. In most insects the second and third thoracic segments also support wings. It has been suggested that these may be homologous to the gill branches of crustaceans, or they may have developed from extensions of the segments themselves.

The abdomen follows an epimorphic developmental pattern, where all segments are already present at the end of embryonic development, in all the hexapod groups except for the Protura, which follow an anamorphic developmental pattern, where the hatched juveniles have an incomplete complement of segments and go through a post-embryonic segment addition with each molting before reaching the final adult number of segments. All true insects have eleven segments (often reduced in number in many insect species), but in Protura there are twelve, and in Collembola only six (sometimes reduced to only four). The appendages on the abdomen are extremely reduced, restricted to the external genitalia and sometimes a pair of sensory cerci on the last segment.

== Evolution and relationships ==
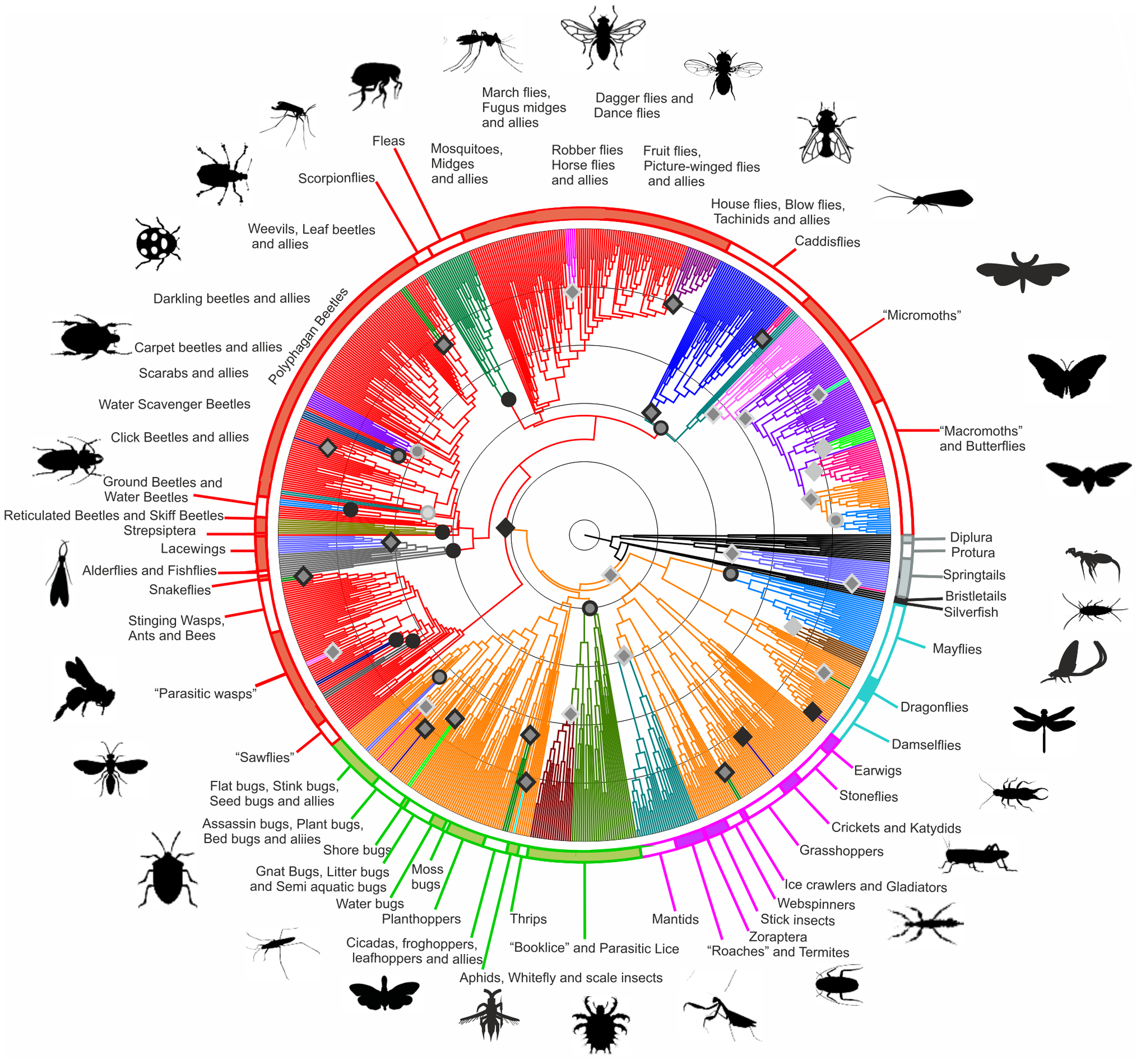
Hexapoda phylogenetic tree

The myriapods have traditionally been considered the closest relatives of the hexapods, based on morphological similarity. These were then considered subclasses of a subphylum called Uniramia or Atelocerata. In the first decade of the 21st century, however, this was called into question, and it appears the hexapods' closest relatives may be the crustaceans.

The non-insect hexapods have variously been considered a single evolutionary line, typically treated as Entognatha, or as several lines with different relationships with the Class Insecta. In particular, the Diplura may be more closely related to the Insecta than to the Collembola (springtails).

A 2002 molecular analysis suggests that the hexapods diverged from their sister group, the Anostraca (fairy shrimps), at around the start of the Silurian period 440 million years ago, coinciding with the appearance of vascular plants on land.

Since then remipedians have been revealed as closest living relative of hexapods. Several hypotheses about their internal relationships have been suggested over the years, with proturans as the sister group to the other hexapods and collembolans and diplurans belonging together in Antennomusculata as the latest suggestion:

- Entognatha (proturans, collembolans and diplurans) and Ectognatha (insects)
- Ellipura (proturans and collembolans) and Cercophora (diplurans and insects)
- Collembolans, Nonoculata (proturans and diplurans) and insects
- Proturans, Antennomusculata (collembolans and diplurans) and insects

The following cladogram is given by Kjer et al. (2016):

- Hexapoda
  - - Collembola (springtails)
    - Protura (coneheads)
  - - Diplura (two-pronged bristletails)
    - Insecta (Ectognatha)
      - Archaeognatha (jumping bristletails)
      - - Zygentoma (silverfish)
        - Pterygota (winged insects)

An incomplete possible insect fossil, Strudiella devonica, has been recovered from the Devonian period. This fossil may help to fill the arthropod gap from 385 million to 325 million years ago, although some researchers oppose this view and suggest that the fossil may instead represent a decomposed crustacean or other non-insect. In 2023, a hexapod-like arthropod fossil from the Ordovician marine fossil site Castle Bank was reported, although further study is needed.
