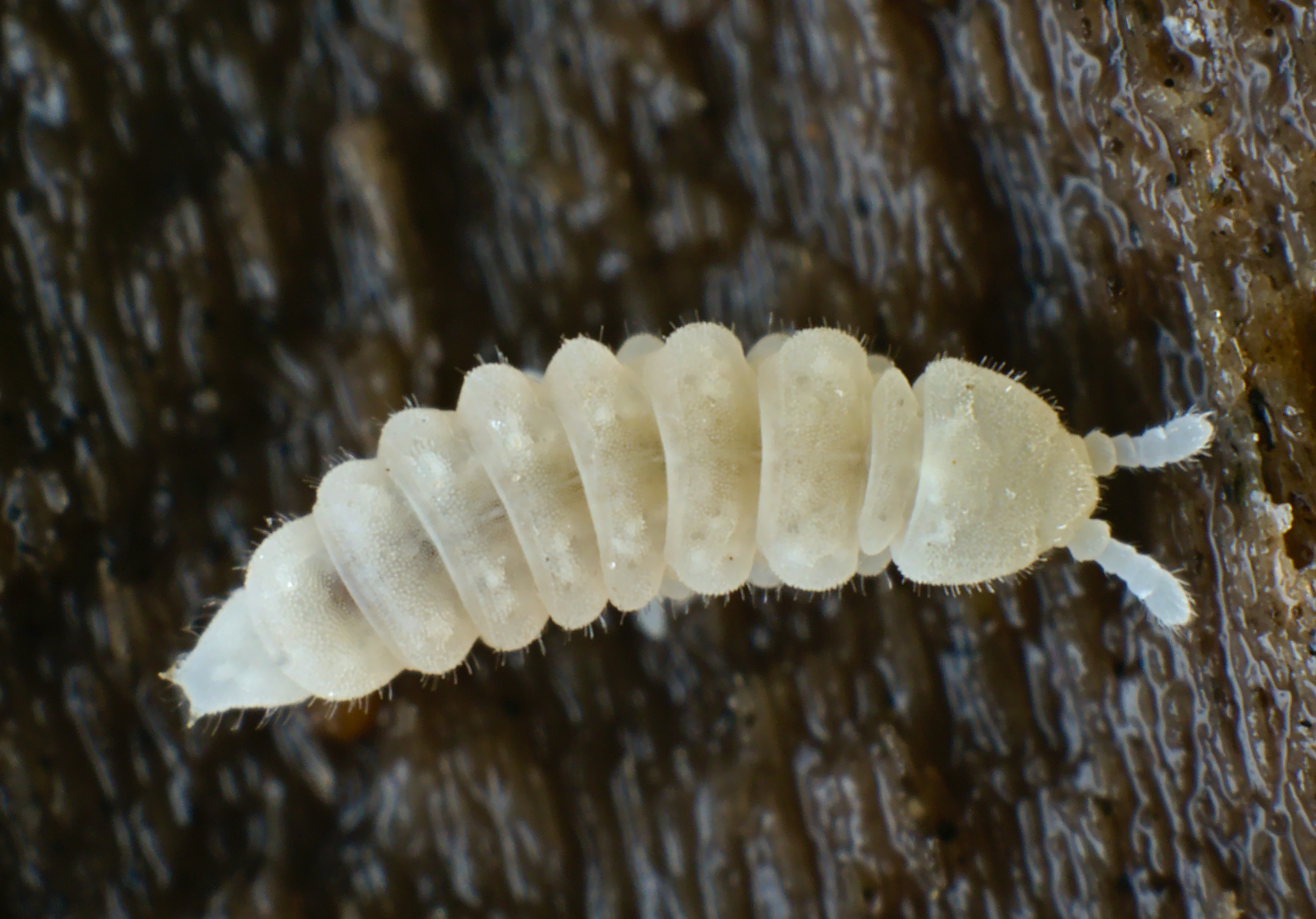

Scientific classification
- Kingdom: Animalia
- Phylum: Arthropoda
- Clade: Pancrustacea
- Class: Collembola
- Order: Poduromorpha
- Family: Onychiuridae
- Genus: Kalaphorura
- Species: K. burmeisteri

Binomial name
- Kalaphorura burmeisteri Lubbock, 1873

= Kalaphorura burmeisteri =

Species of springtail

Kalaphorura burmeisteri is a species of springtail of the family Onychiuridae described by Lubbock in 1873.
