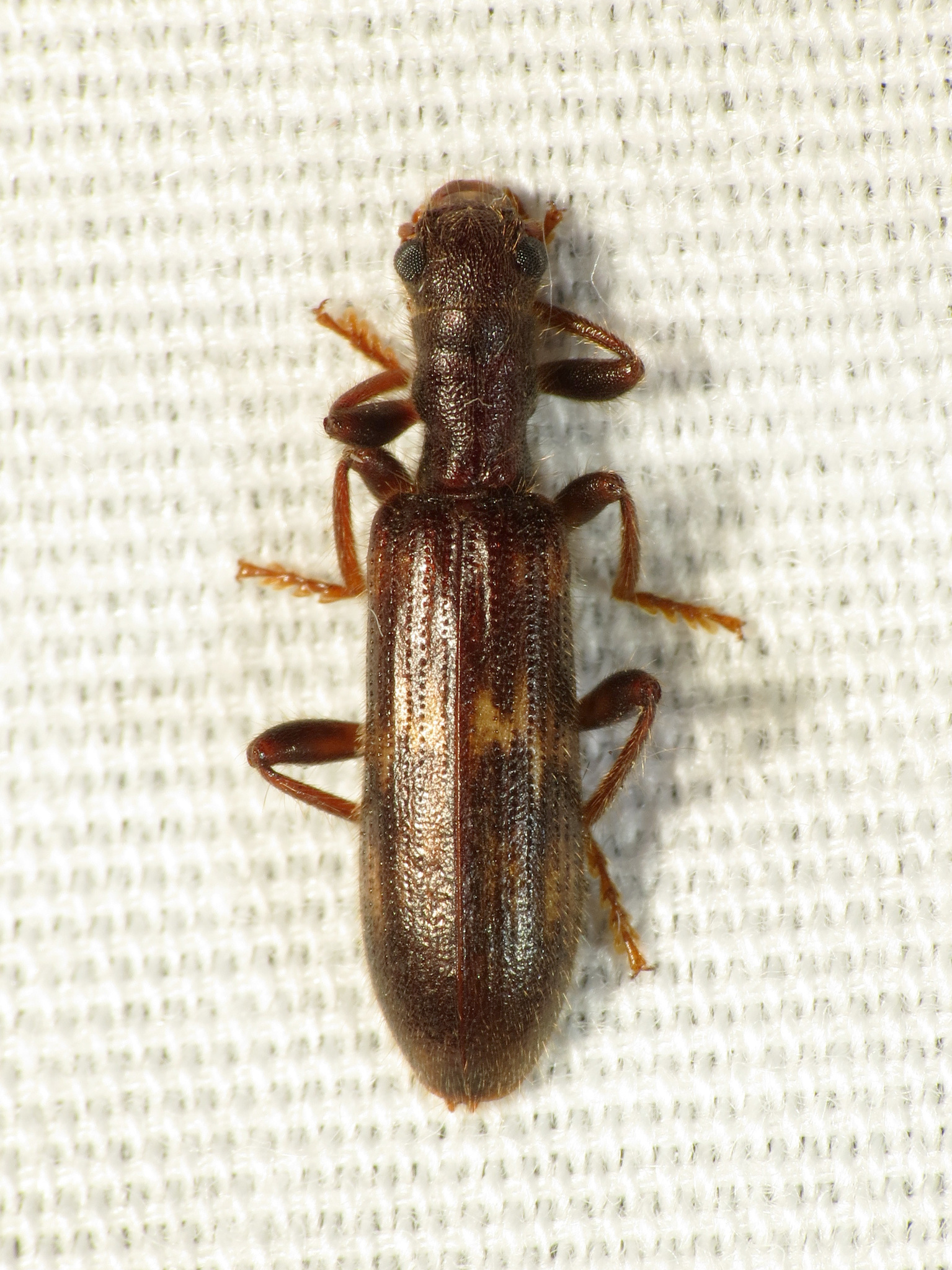
- Cymatodera flavosignata

Scientific classification
- Domain: Eukaryota
- Kingdom: Animalia
- Phylum: Arthropoda
- Class: Insecta
- Order: Coleoptera
- Suborder: Polyphaga
- Infraorder: Cucujiformia
- Family: Cleridae
- Subfamily: Tillinae
- Genus: Cymatodera; Grey, 1832

= Cymatodera =

Genus of beetles

Cymatodera is a genus of checkered beetles in the family Cleridae. There are at least 70 described species in Cymatodera.

== See also ==
- List of Cymatodera species
