= Panorpa floridana =

Scientific classification
- Kingdom: Animalia
- Phylum: Arthropoda
- Clade: Pancrustacea
- Class: Insecta
- Order: Mecoptera
- Family: Panorpidae
- Genus: Panorpa
- Species: P. floridana

Binomial name
- Panorpa floridana Byers, 1993

Species of insect

Panorpa floridana, the Florida scorpionfly, is a species of common scorpionfly in the family Panorpidae. It has only been found in two Florida counties, Clay and Alachua. Described as "cryptic" it is quite handsome in a buggy way.

It is a rare Florida endemic. It was not recorded from a sighting for 28 years until it was rediscovered in 2010 from a photo taken at Gold Head Branch State Park in Clay County, Florida.

== See also ==
- Panorpa lugubris Swederus, mourning scorpion fly
- Panorpa rufa red scorpion fly
