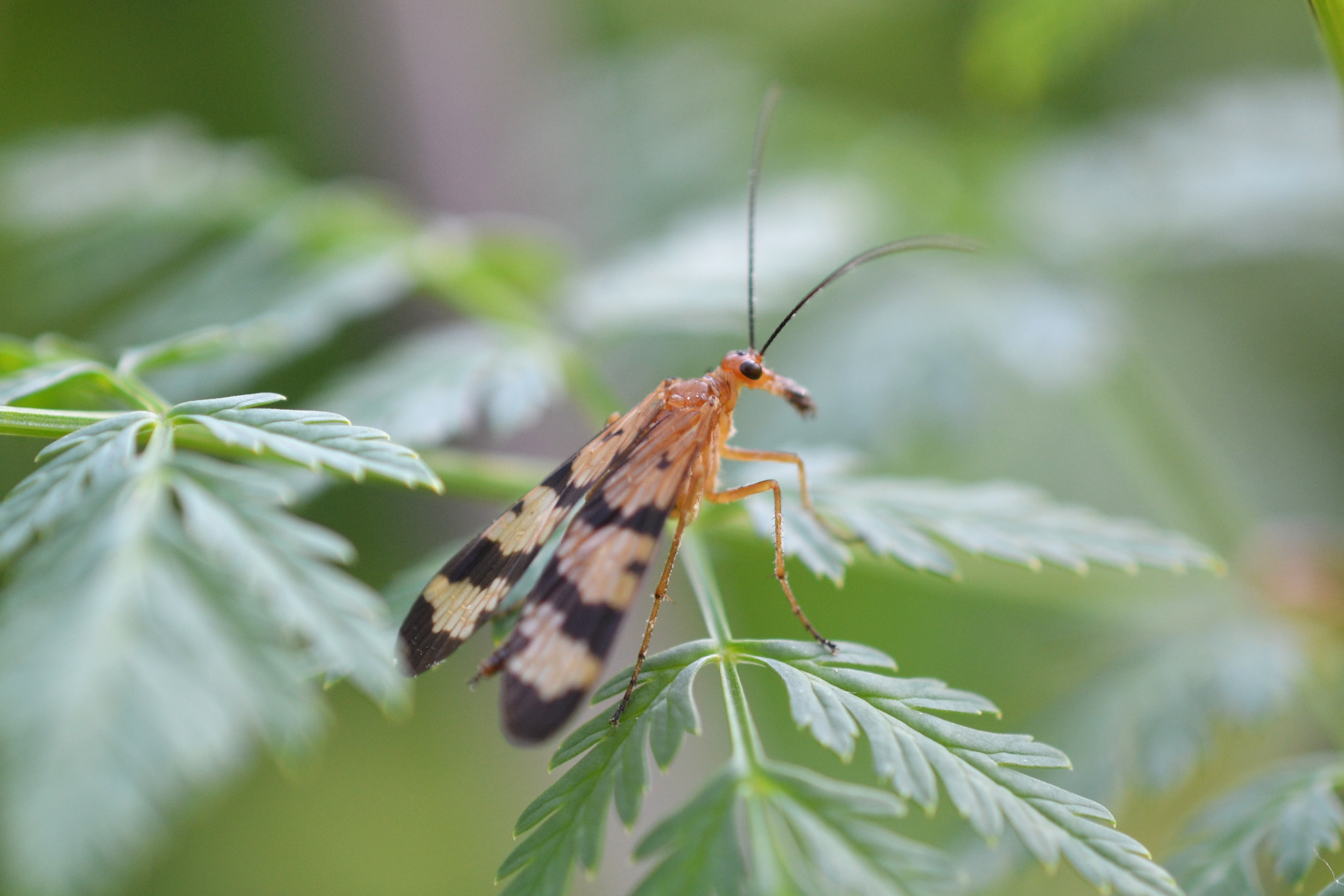

Scientific classification
- Kingdom: Animalia
- Phylum: Arthropoda
- Clade: Pancrustacea
- Class: Insecta
- Order: Mecoptera
- Family: Panorpidae
- Genus: Panorpa
- Species: P. helena

Binomial name
- Panorpa helena Byers, 1962

= Panorpa helena =

Species of insect

Panorpa helena is a species of common scorpionfly in the family Panorpidae. It is found in North America.
