= Panorpa setifera =

Scientific classification
- Kingdom: Animalia
- Phylum: Arthropoda
- Clade: Pancrustacea
- Class: Insecta
- Order: Mecoptera
- Family: Panorpidae
- Genus: Panorpa
- Species: P. setifera

Binomial name
- Panorpa setifera Webb, 1974

Species of insect

Panorpa setifera is a species of common scorpionfly in the family Panorpidae. It is found in North America.
