= P. vernalis =

P. vernalis may refer to one of the following species:

== Animals ==
- Panorpa vernalis, a common scorpionfly species
- Parotis vernalis, a moth species
- Podabrus vernalis, a soldier beetle species
- Pterostichus vernalis, a ground beetle species

== Plants ==
- Paxillus vernalis, a basidiomycete fungus species
- Pholiota vernalis, a fungus species
- Primula vernalis, a synonym for Primula vulgaris, the common primrose, a flowering plant species
- Pterostylis vernalis, an orchid species
- Pulsatilla vernalis, a flowering plant species
