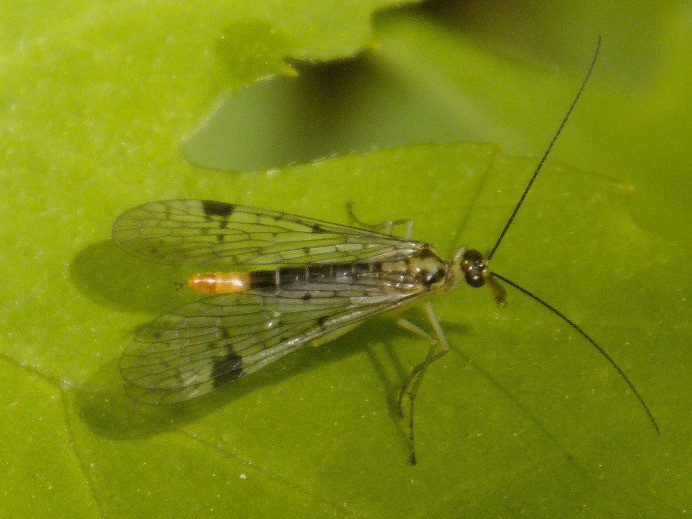

Scientific classification
- Domain: Eukaryota
- Kingdom: Animalia
- Phylum: Arthropoda
- Class: Insecta
- Order: Mecoptera
- Family: Panorpidae
- Genus: Panorpa
- Species: P. flexa

Binomial name
- Panorpa flexa Carpenter, 1935

= Panorpa flexa =

Species of insect

Panorpa flexa is a species of common scorpionfly in the family Panorpidae. It is found in North America.
