= Panorpa virginica =

Scientific classification
- Kingdom: Animalia
- Phylum: Arthropoda
- Clade: Pancrustacea
- Class: Insecta
- Order: Mecoptera
- Family: Panorpidae
- Genus: Panorpa
- Species: P. virginica

Binomial name
- Panorpa virginica Banks, 1906

Species of insect

Panorpa virginica is a species of common scorpionfly in the family Panorpidae. It is found in North America.
