= Panorpa neglecta =

Scientific classification
- Kingdom: Animalia
- Phylum: Arthropoda
- Clade: Pancrustacea
- Class: Insecta
- Order: Mecoptera
- Family: Panorpidae
- Genus: Panorpa
- Species: P. neglecta

Binomial name
- Panorpa neglecta Carpenter, 1931

Species of insect

Panorpa neglecta is a species of common scorpionfly in the family Panorpidae. It is indigenous to North America.
