= Panorpa oconee =

Scientific classification
- Kingdom: Animalia
- Phylum: Arthropoda
- Clade: Pancrustacea
- Class: Insecta
- Order: Mecoptera
- Family: Panorpidae
- Genus: Panorpa
- Species: P. oconee

Binomial name
- Panorpa oconee Byers, 1993

Species of insect

Panorpa oconee is a species of common scorpionfly in the family Panorpidae. It is found in North America.
