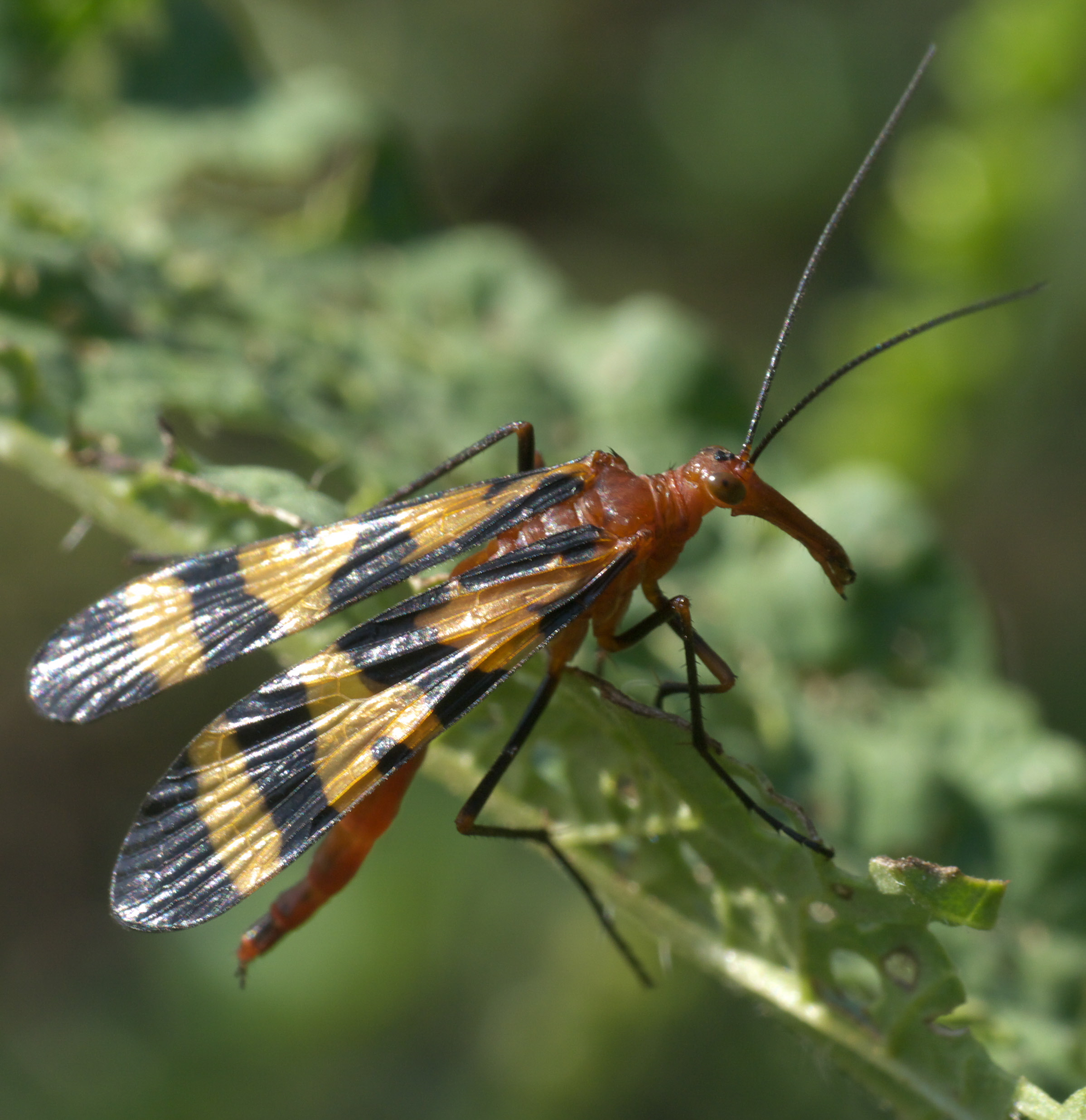

Scientific classification
- Kingdom: Animalia
- Phylum: Arthropoda
- Clade: Pancrustacea
- Class: Insecta
- Order: Mecoptera
- Family: Panorpidae
- Genus: Panorpa
- Species: P. nuptialis

Binomial name
- Panorpa nuptialis Gerstaecker, 1863

= Panorpa nuptialis =

Species of insect

Panorpa nuptialis is a species of common scorpionfly in the family Panorpidae found in North America. It is known to be quite common in Texas, in wooded areas, and densely vegetated ravines. Despite its name it does not use its tail to sting but rather to mate with females of its species.

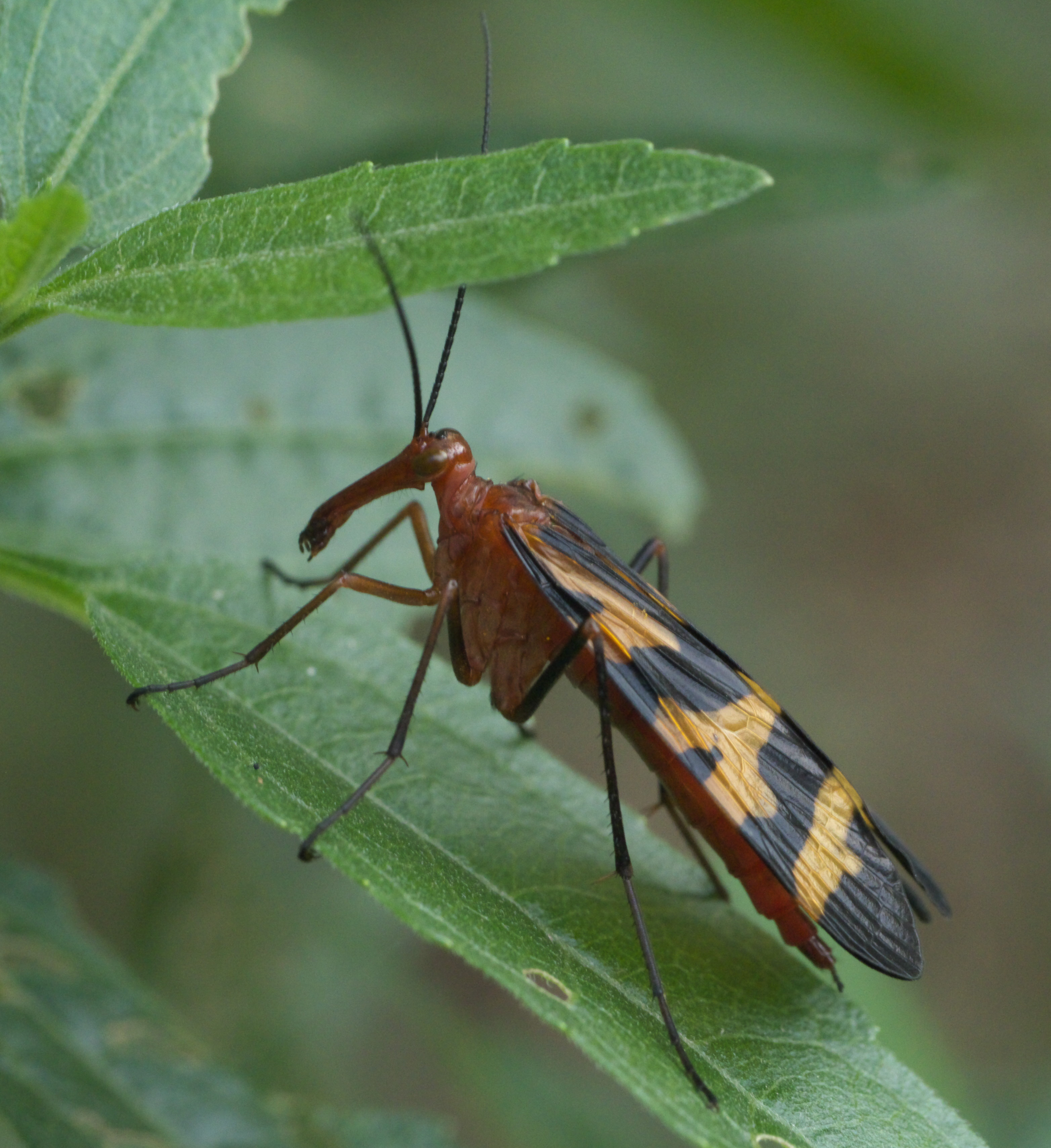

Description Panorpa nuptialis is known to grow up to an inch long, and can be identified by its orange wings with defined angulate black bands.
