= Panorpa dubitans =

Scientific classification
- Kingdom: Animalia
- Phylum: Arthropoda
- Clade: Pancrustacea
- Class: Insecta
- Order: Mecoptera
- Family: Panorpidae
- Genus: Panorpa
- Species: P. dubitans

Binomial name
- Panorpa dubitans Carpenter, 1931

Species of insect

Panorpa dubitans is a species in the family Panorpidae ("common scorpionflies"), in the order Mecoptera. It is found in North America.
