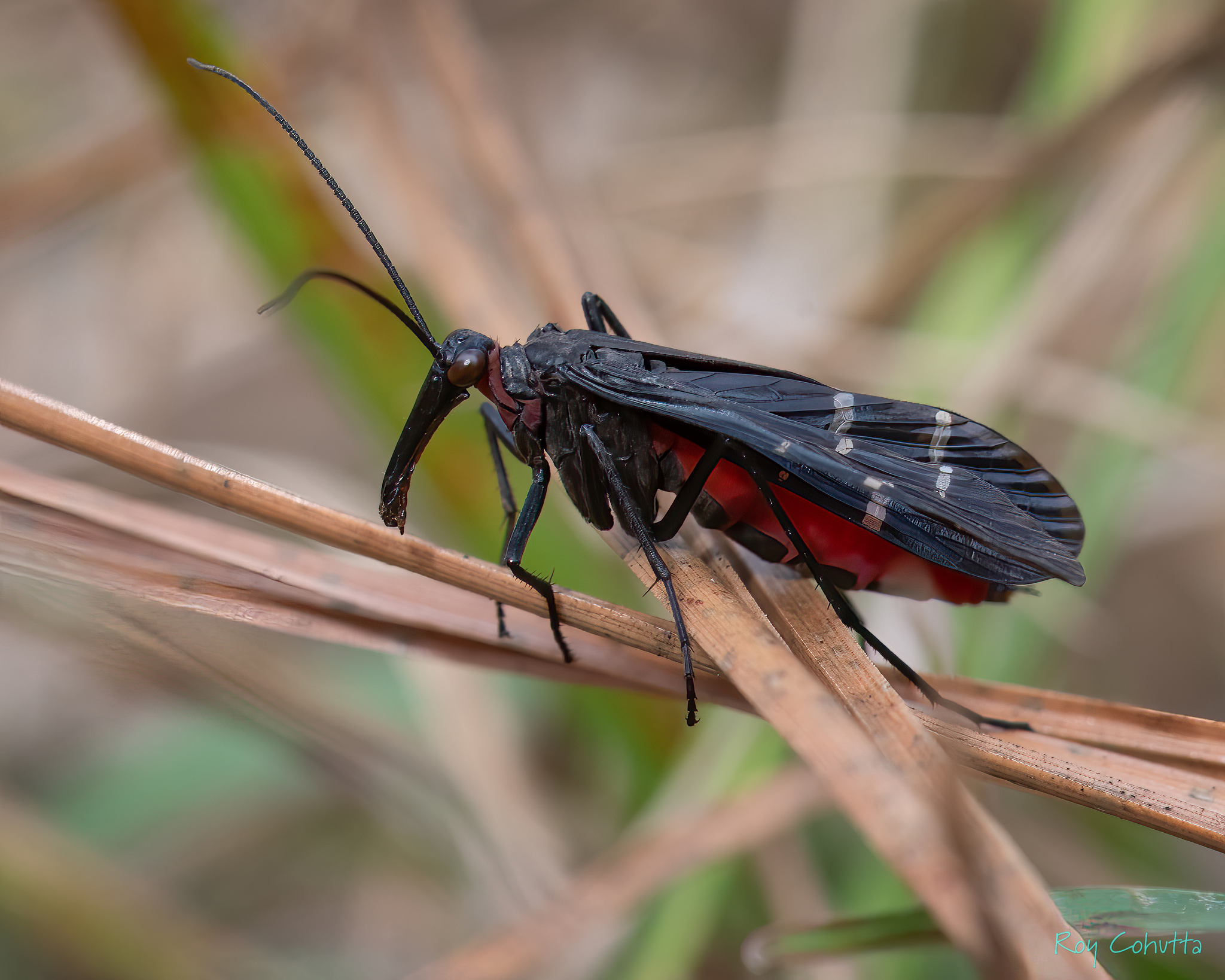
- Panorpa lugubris, Georgia, USA

Scientific classification
- Kingdom: Animalia
- Phylum: Arthropoda
- Clade: Pancrustacea
- Class: Insecta
- Order: Mecoptera
- Family: Panorpidae
- Genus: Panorpa
- Species: P. lugubris

Binomial name
- Panorpa lugubris (Swederus, 1787)

= Panorpa lugubris =

Species of insect

Panorpa lugubris, the mourning scorpionfly, is a species of common scorpionfly in the family Panorpidae. It is found in North America. The mourning scorpionfly is associated with the longleaf pine ecosystem.
