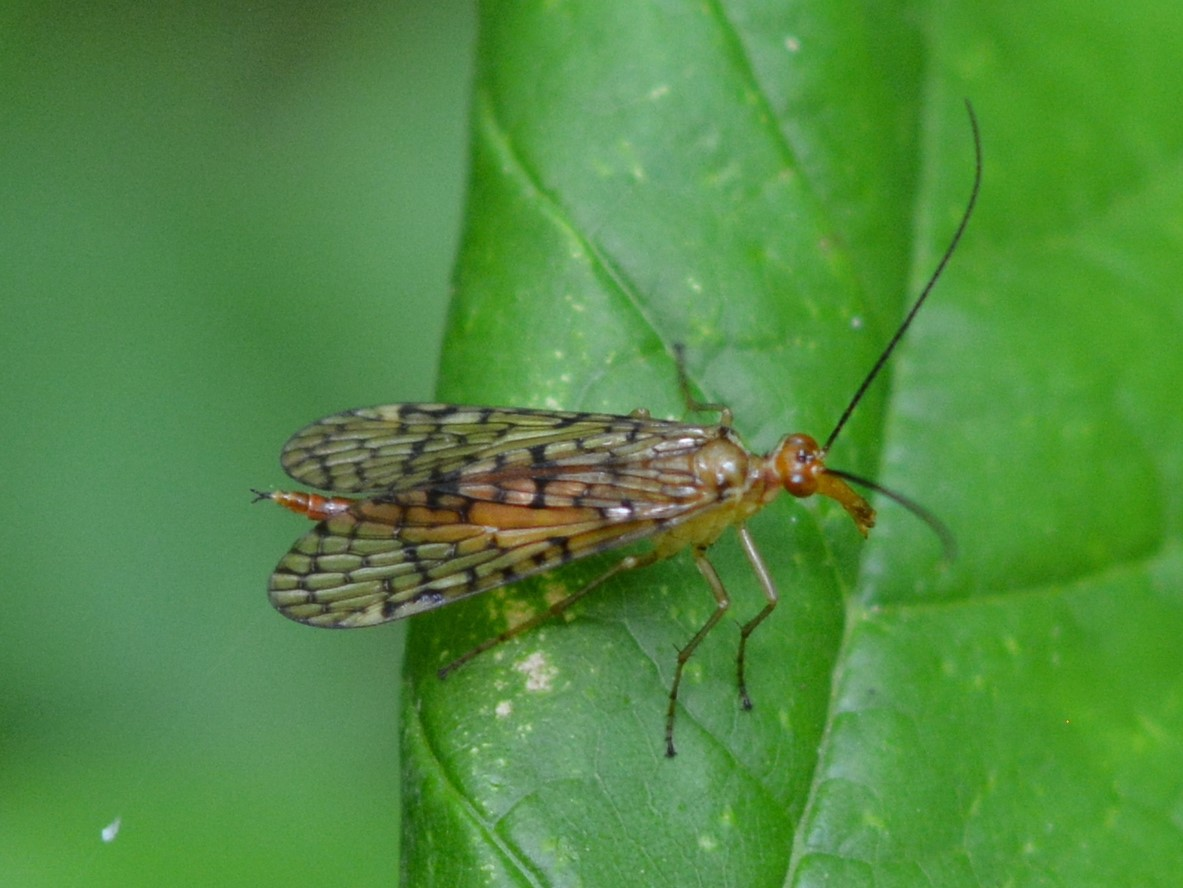

Scientific classification
- Kingdom: Animalia
- Phylum: Arthropoda
- Clade: Pancrustacea
- Class: Insecta
- Order: Mecoptera
- Family: Panorpidae
- Genus: Panorpa
- Species: P. vernalis

Binomial name
- Panorpa vernalis Byers, 1973

= Panorpa vernalis =

Species of insect

Panorpa vernalis is a species of common scorpionfly in the family Panorpidae. It is found in North America, and has been identified in Texas, Oklahoma, Alabama, Arkansas, Kansas, Louisiana, Mississippi and Missouri. It has no known subtaxa.
