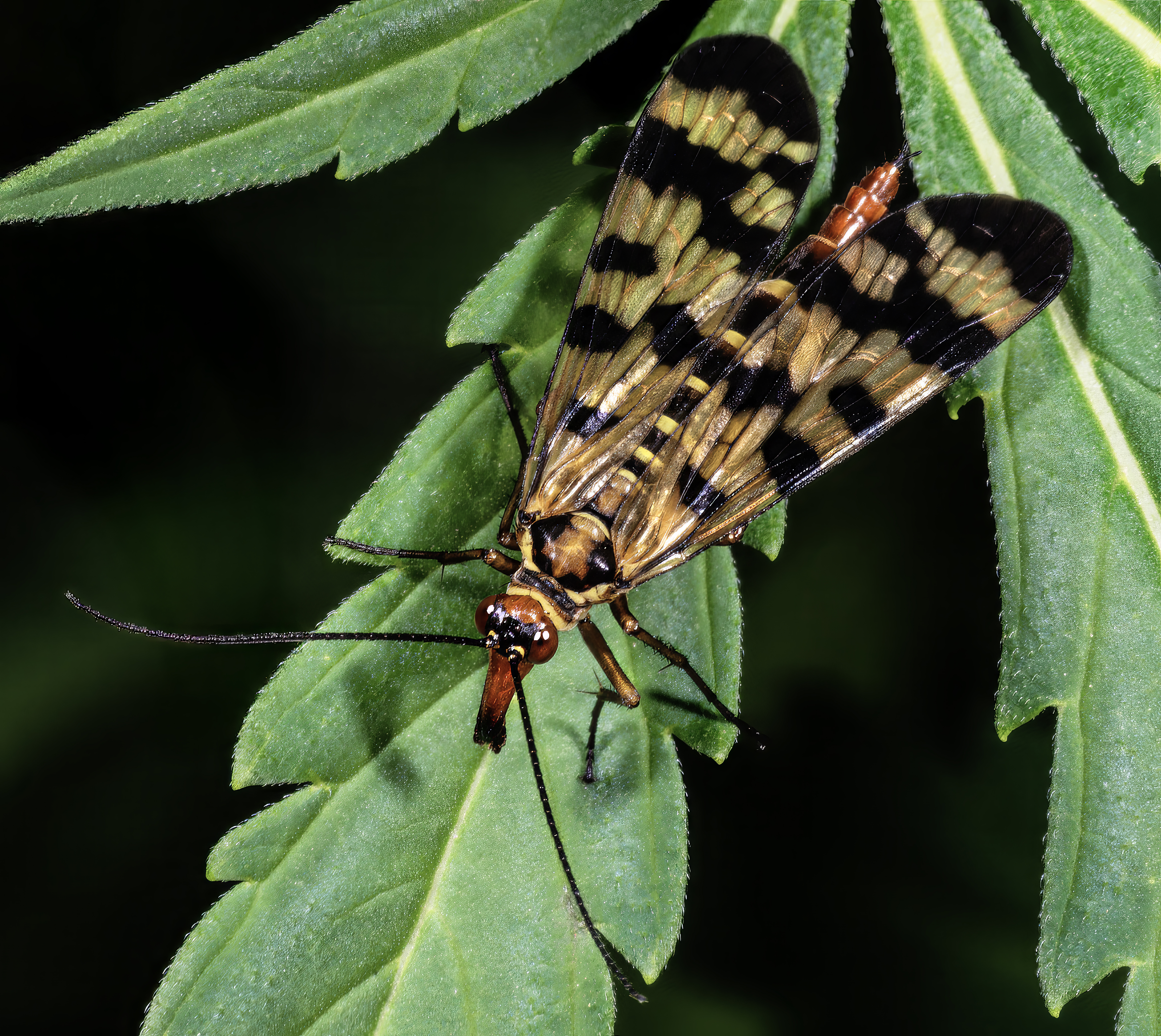
- Female P. vulgaris
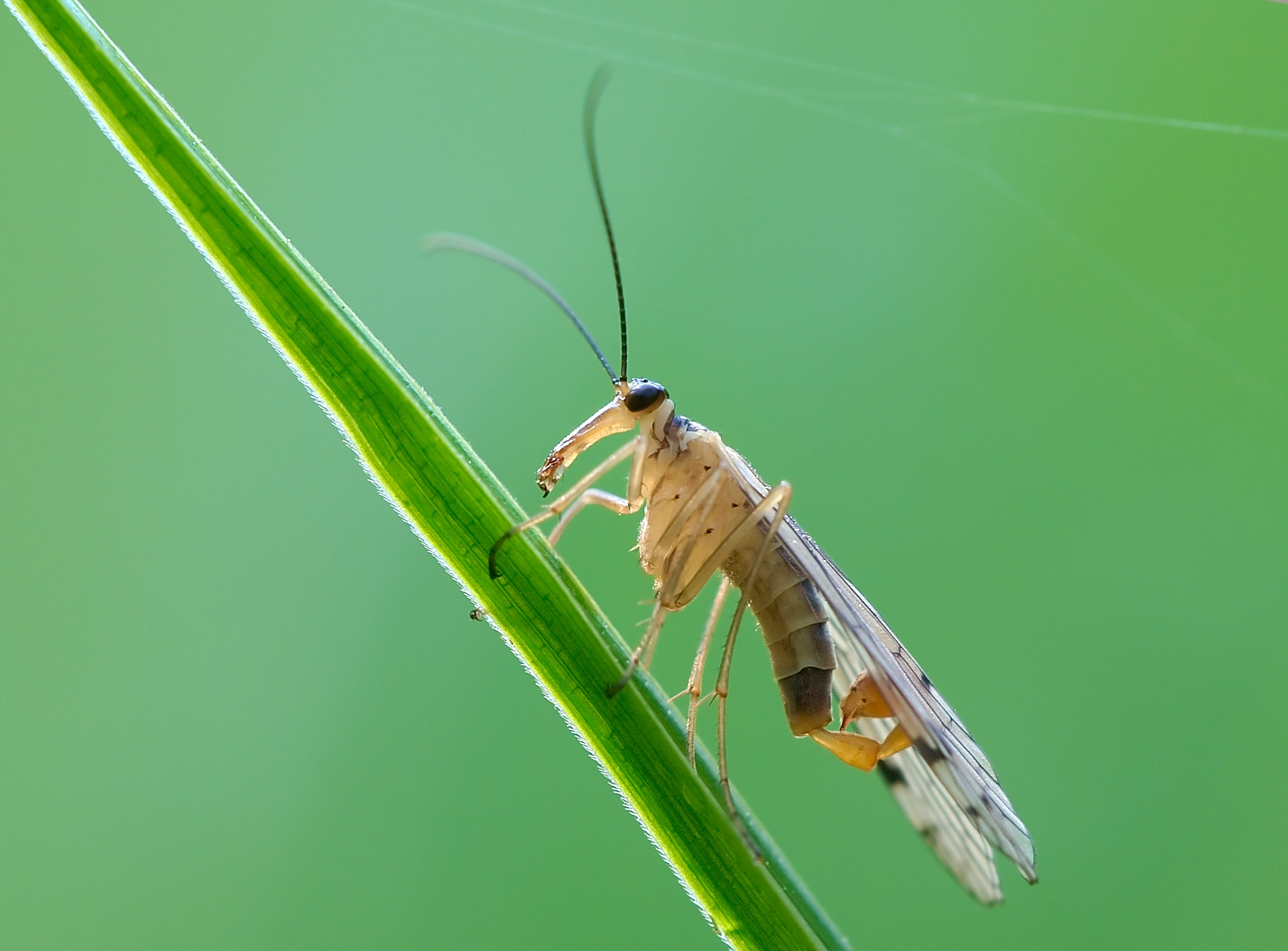
- Male P. alpina

Scientific classification
- Kingdom: Animalia
- Phylum: Arthropoda
- Clade: Pancrustacea
- Class: Insecta
- Order: Mecoptera
- Family: Panorpidae
- Genus: Panorpa; Linnaeus, 1758

Species
- See text

= Panorpa =

Genus of insects

Panorpa is a genus of scorpionflies that is widely dispersed, especially in the Northern Hemisphere. However, they do not occur in western North America. Thirteen species occur in eastern Canada.

About 260 species are described as of 2018.

Larvae and adults feed on carrion.

The species P. vulgaris, has become a model insect for testing theories of sexual selection as its mating system has been noted to be similar to that of humans in some aspects. Studies show that both sexes of the species display mating preferences for direct (e.g. nuptial gifts) and indirect benefits (e.g. genetic benefits) to increase reproductive success. The production of nuptial gifts during copulation in males (e.g. salivary secretion) and high nutritional condition in females are indicators of "good foraging genes", an indirect benefit that individuals look for in their partners. These genetic benefits can increase fitness in offspring and improve their foraging ability.

The life-cycle of Panorpa nuptialis and its habits, have become of interest in the field of forensic entomology.

== Species ==
This list is basically adapted from the World Checklist of extant Mecoptera species: Panorpa and complete as of 2018.

- Panorpa acanthophylla Zhou, 2006 (China: Guizhou)
- Panorpa accola Byers, 2011 (Mexico: Guerrero)
- Panorpa acicularis Byers, 2001 (Mexico: Oaxaca)
- Panorpa aculeata Byers, 2001 (Mexico: Oaxaca)
- Panorpa acuminata Byers, 1993 (USA: Georgia)
- Panorpa acuta Carpenter, 1931 (USA: Connecticut, Georgia, Kentucky, Massachusetts, Michigan, New Hampshire, New Jersey, New York, North Carolina, Pennsylvania, South Carolina, Tennessee, Virginia, West Virginia)
- Panorpa akasakai Issiki, 1929 (Taiwan)
- Panorpa alata Zhou & Zhou, 2005 (USA: Georgia)
- Panorpa alpina Rambur, 1842 (Europe)
- Panorpa amamiensis Miyamoto & Makihara, 1984 (Japan)
- Panorpa americana Swederus, 1787 (USA: Alabama, Delaware, Florida, Georgia, Louisiana, Mississippi, New Jersey, North Carolina, South Carolina, Virginia)
- Panorpa amurensis MacLachlan, 1872 (Korea, Russia: Far Eastern Province)

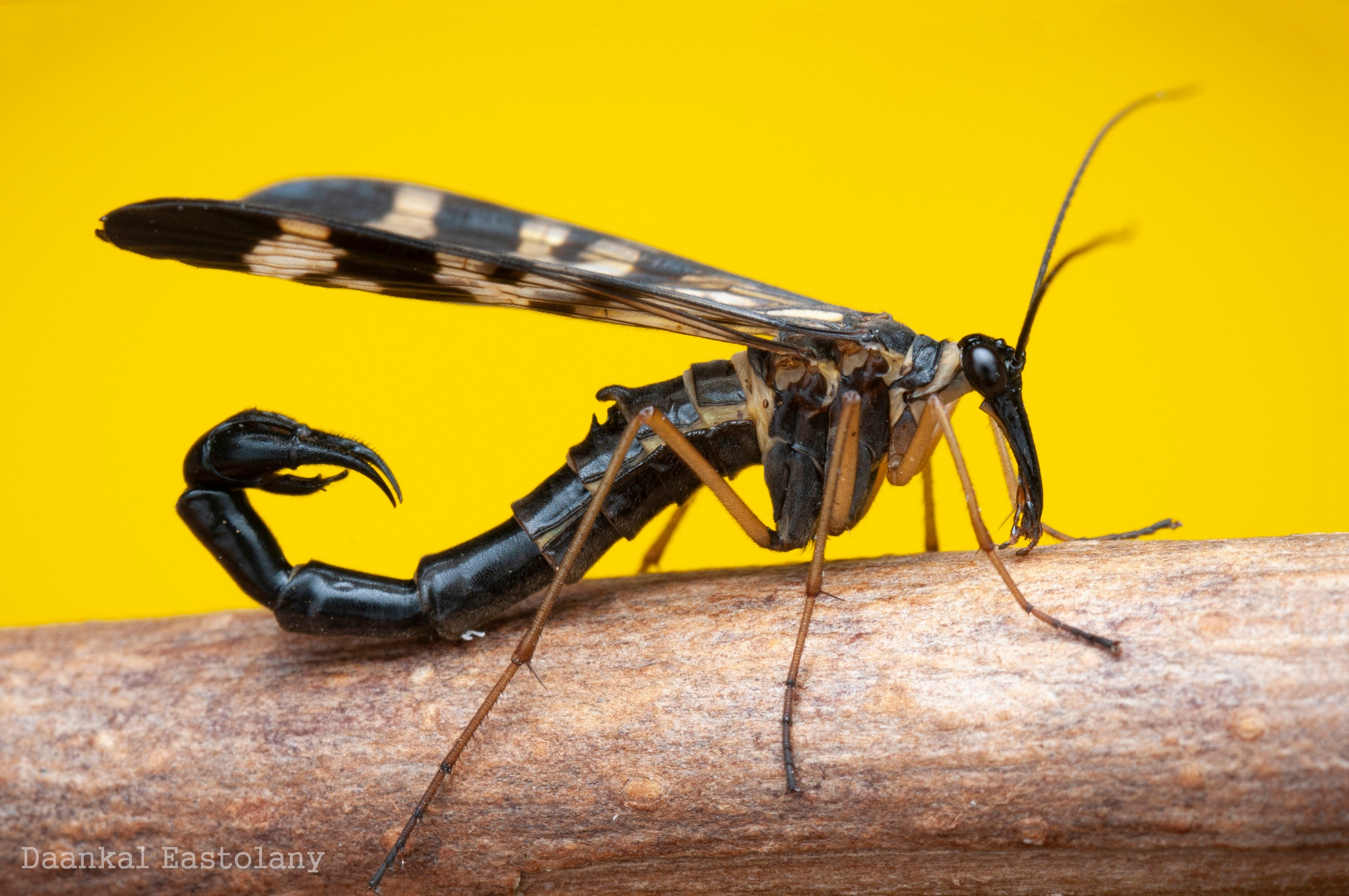
Panorpa amurensis, Adult, South Korea

- Panorpa anfracta Ju & Zhou, 2003 (China: Zhejiang)
- Panorpa angustistriata Issiki, 1929 (Taiwan)
- Panorpa annexa MacLachlan, 1869 (France, Germany, Sicily, Italy)

- Panorpa annexa latina Navás, 1928 (Italy)
- Panorpa annexa subalpina Navás, 1928 (Italy)
- Panorpa annexa etrusca Willmann, 1976 (Italy)

- Panorpa anomala Carpenter, 1931 (USA: Arkansas, Iowa, Illinois, Indiana, Kansas, Louisiana, Michigan, Missouri, Mississippi, Wisconsin)
- Panorpa anrenensis Chou & Wang, 1987 (China: Hunan)
- Panorpa antiporum Nagler, 1968 (Romania)
- Panorpa apiconebulosa Issiki, 1929 (Taiwan)
- Panorpa apiculata Byers, 2000 (Mexico: Michoacan)
- Panorpa appalachia Byers, 2002 (USA: North Carolina)
- Panorpa approximata Esben-Petersen, 1915 (Korea)
- Panorpa arcuata (Navás, 1912) (Russia: Far East)
- Panorpa aspoecki Willmann, 1973 (Turkey)
- Panorpa attenuata Byers, 1996 (Mexico: San Luis Potosí)
- Panorpa aurea Cheng, 1957 (China: Fujian, Zhejiang)
- Panorpa azteca Byers, 1958 (Mexico: D.F., Mexico)
- Panorpa babai Miyamoto, 1979(Japan: Echigo)
- Panorpa banksi Hine, 1901 (USA: Georgia, Iowa, Illinois, Indiana, Kentucky, Massachusetts, Maine, Michigan, Mississippi, North Carolina, New York, South Carolina)
- Panorpa banksiana Penny & Byers, 1979 (USA: North Carolina, New Jersey)
- Panorpa baohwashana Cheng, 1957 (China: Jiangsu)
- Panorpa bashanicola Hua, Tao & Hua, 2018 (China: Shaanxi)
- Panorpa bichai Byers, 1993 (USA: Indiana, Tennessee)
- Panorpa biclada Zhang & Hua, 2012 (China: Shaanxi, Hubei)
- Panorpa bicornuta MacLachlan, 1887 (Japan)
- Panorpa bifasciata Chou & Wang, 1981 (China: Shaanxi, Hubei)
- Panorpa bifida Carpenter, 1935 (USA: Ohio, Pennsylvania, Tennessee, Virginia, West Virginia)
- Panorpa bimacula Byers, 1996 (Mexico: Oaxaca)
- Panorpa bistriata Issiki, 1929 (Taiwan)
- Panorpa braueri Carpenter, 1931 (USA: Arkansas, Missouri)
- Panorpa brevititilana Issiki, 1929 (Taiwan)
- Panorpa bunun Issiki, 1929 (Taiwan)
- Panorpa capillata Byers, 1996 (USA: Alabama, Arkansas, Kentucky, Mississippi, Tennessee)
- Panorpa carolinensis Banks, 1905 (USA: North Carolina, Tennessee)
- Panorpa carpenteri Cheng, 1957 (China: Sichuan)
- Panorpa caucasica MacLachlan, 1869 (Iran, Iraq)
- Panorpa changbaishana Hua, 2008 (China: Jilin, Liaoning)
- Panorpa chengi Chou, 1981 (China: Shaanxi)
- Panorpa cheni Cheng, 1957 (China: Zhejiang)
- Panorpa chiensis Cheng, 1953 (Korea)
- Panorpa choctaw Byers, 1993 (USA: Alabama, Arkansas, Georgia, Kentucky, Missouri, Mississippi, Oklahoma, Tennessee)
- Panorpa choui Zhou & Wu, 1993 (China: Zhejiang)
- Panorpa cladocerca Navás, 1935 (China: Jiangxi)
- Panorpa claripennis Hine, 1901 (USA (Connecticut, Florida, Massachusetts, Michigan, New Hampshire, New York, Ohio, Vermont, Wisconsin, West Virginia), Canada: Quebec)
- Panorpa clavigera Klapálek, 1902 (Hercegovina)
- Panorpa cognata Rambur, 1842 (England, Belgium, Denmark, Germany, Netherlands, Russia, Sweden)

- Panorpa cognata osellai Willmann, 1976 (Italy)

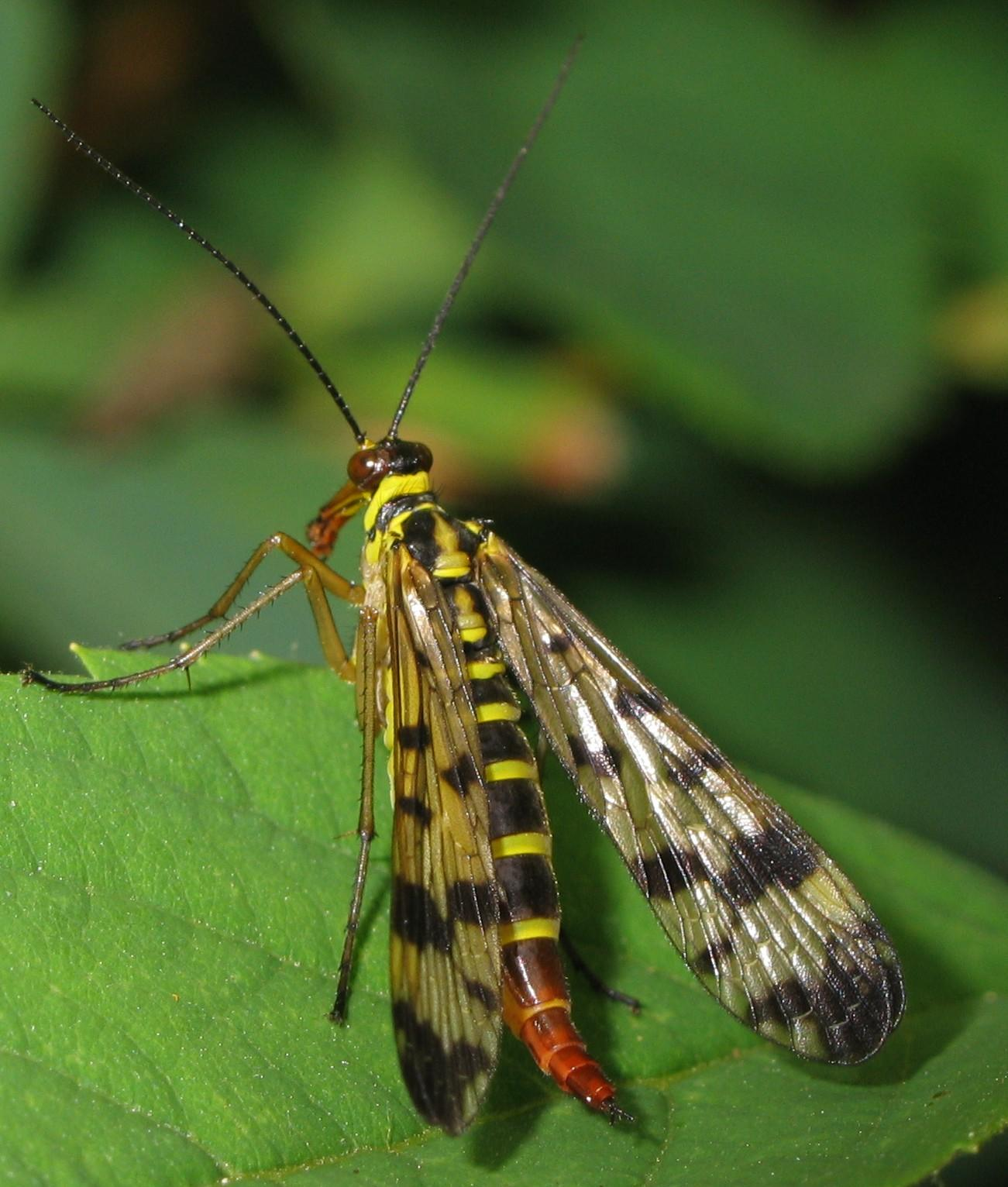
P. communis

- Panorpa communis Linnaeus, 1758 (Andorra, Belgium, France, Germany, Italy, Switzerland, Russia, England, Spain)

- Panorpa communis raehlei Lauterbach, 1970 (Europe)

- Panorpa concolor Esben-Petersen, 1915 (Taiwan)
- Panorpa confinis Byers, 1993 (USA: Alabama, Mississippi)
- Panorpa connexa MacLachlan, 1869 (Caucasus Mountains, Turkey)
- Panorpa consuetudinis Snodgrass, 1927 (USA: Alabama, Connecticut, Washington, Delaware, Indiana, Maryland, Mississippi, North Carolina, New Jersey, New York, Ohio, Pennsylvania, South Carolina, Virginia)
- Panorpa contorta Byers, 1996 (Mexico: Hidalgo, San Luis Potosí, Tamaulipas)
- Panorpa conversa Byers, 2001 (Mexico: Puebla)
- Panorpa coomani Cheng, 1957 (China: Jiangxi)
- Panorpa coreana Okamoto, 1925 (Korea)
- Panorpa cryptica Bicha, 2015 (USA: Georgia)
- Panorpa curva Carpenter, 1938 (China: Sichuan)
- Panorpa curvata Zhou, 2006 (China: Guizhou)
- Panorpa dashahensis Zhou & Zhou, 2005 (China: Guizhou)
- Panorpa davidi Navás, 1908 (China: Sichuan)
- Panorpa debilis Westwood, 1846 (USA (Washington, Illinois, Indiana, Michigan, North Carolina, New Hampshire, New Jersey, New York, Ohio, Pennsylvania, Tennessee, Virginia, Wisconsin, West Virginia), Canada: Ontario, Quebec)
- Panorpa deceptor Esben-Petersen, 1913 (Taiwan)
- Panorpa decolorata Chou & Wang, 1981 (China: Shaanxi, Hubei)
- Panorpa dichotoma Miyamoto, 1977 (Japan)

- Panorpa dichotoma intermedia Miyamoto, 1977 (Japan)

- Panorpa difficilis Carpenter, 1938 (China: Sichuan)
- Panorpa dissimilis Carpenter, 1931 (USA: New Jersey, New York, Virginia)
- Panorpa dicidilacinia Bicha, 2016 (Mexico: Michoacan)
- Panorpa dubitans Carpenter, 1931 (USA: Illinois, Indiana, Wisconsin)
- Panorpa emeishana Hua, Sun & Li, 2001 (China: Sichuan)
- Panorpa ensigera Bicha, 1983 (USA: North Carolina, South Carolina)
- Panorpa esakii Issiki, 1929 (Taiwan)
- Panorpa falsa Issiki & Cheng, 1947 (Taiwan)
- Panorpa ferruginea Byers, 1993 (USA: Alabama, Georgia, Mississippi)
- Panorpa filina Chou & Wang, 1987 (China: Hunan)
- Panorpa flavicorporis Cheng, 1957 (China: Fukien)
- Panorpa flavipennis Carpenter, 1938 (China: Sichuan)
- Panorpa flexa Carpenter, 1935 (USA: Georgia, North Carolina, South Carolina, Tennessee)
- Panorpa floridana Byers, 1993 (USA: Florida)
- Panorpa fructa Cheng, 1949 (China: Sichuan)
- Panorpa fukiensis Tjeder, 1951 (China: Fujian)
- Panorpa fulvastra Chou, 1981 (China: Shaanxi)
- Panorpa furcata Zhou & Zhou, 2007 (China: Guizhou)
- Panorpa fusca Byers, 2001 (Mexico: Puebla)
- Panorpa galerita Byers, 1962 (USA (New Hampshire, New Jersey, New York, Ohio, Pennsylvania, Wisconsin), Canada: Quebec)
- Panorpa germanica Linnaeus, 1758 (Belgium, France, Germany, Greece, Italy, Scotland, Norway)

- Panorpa germanica euboica Lauterbach, 1972 (Balkans of southern Europe)
- Panorpa germanica graeca Lauterbach, 1972 (Greece)
- Panorpa germanica riegeri Lauterbach, 1971 (Germany)
- Panorpa germanica rumelica Lauterbach, 1972 (Turkey)

- Panorpa gladiata Byers, 2000 (Mexico: Oaxaca)
- Panorpa globulifera Miyamoto, 1994 (Japan)
- Panorpa gracilis Carpenter, 1931 (USA: North Carolina, Virginia)
- Panorpa grahamana Cheng, 1957 (China: Sichuan)
- Panorpa gressitti Byers, 1970 (China: Guangdong)
- Panorpa guidongensis Chou & Li, 1987 (China: Hunan)
- Panorpa guttata Navás, 1908 (China: Sichuan)
- Panorpa hageniana Willmann, 1975 (Turkey)
- Panorpa hakusanensis Miyake, 1913 (Japan)
- Panorpa hamata Issiki & Cheng, 1947 (Taiwan)
- Panorpa helena Byers, 1962 (USA (Arkansas, Connecticut, Georgia, Iowa, Illinois, Indiana, Kansas, Kentucky, Massachusetts, Maryland, Maine, Michigan, Minnesota, Missouri, North Carolina, New Jersey, New York, Ohio, Pennsylvania, South Carolina, Tennessee, Utah, Virginia, Wisconsin, West Virginia), Canada: Manitoba)
- Panorpa hispida Byers, 1993 (USA: Georgia, South Carolina)
- Panorpa hiurai Miyamoto, 1985 (Japan)
- Panorpa horiensis Issiki, 1929 (Taiwan)
- Panorpa horni Navás, 1928 (Russia)
- Panorpa hungerfordi Byers, 1973 (USA: Indiana, Kentucky, Michigan, Ohio, Wisconsin)
- Panorpa hybrida MacLachlan, 1882 (Romania, Finland, Germany, Russia, Bulgaria)
- Panorpa immaculata Esben-Petersen, 1915 (Mexico: Guerrero, Mexico)
- Panorpa implicata Cheng, 1957 (China: Fujian)
- Panorpa indivisa Martynova, 1957 (Russia: Far East)
- Panorpa insigna Bicha, 2006 (Mexico: Jalisco)
- Panorpa insolens Carpenter, 1935 (USA: Kentucky, Ohio)
- Panorpa insularis Hua & Chou, 1998 (China: Hainan)
- Panorpa involuta Byers, 1996 (Mexico: Veracruz)
- Panorpa ishiharai Miyamoto, 1994 (Japan)
- Panorpa isolata Carpenter, 1931 (USA: Alabama, Washington, Georgia, Kentucky, Mississippi, North Carolina, Pennsylvania, South Carolina, Tennessee)
- Panorpa issikiana Byers, 1970 (China: Yunnan)
- Panorpa issikii Penny & Byers, 1979 (Taiwan)
- Panorpa japonica Thunberg, 1784 (Japan)
- Panorpa jilinensis Zhou, 2000 (China: Jilin)
- Panorpa jinchuana Hua, Sun & Li, 1994 (China: Sichuan)
- Panorpa jinhuaensis Wang, Gao & Hua, 2019 (China)
- Panorpa kagamontana Miyamoto, 1979 (Japan)
- Panorpa kellogi Cheng, 1957 (China: Fujian)
- Panorpa kiautai Zhou & WU, 1993 (China: Zhejiang)
- Panorpa kiusiuensis Issiki, 1929 (Japan)
- Panorpa klapperichi Tjeder, 1951 (China: Fujian)
- Panorpa kongosana Okamoto, 1925 (Korea)
- Panorpa kunmingensis Fu & Hua, 2009 (China: Yunnan)
- Panorpa lacedaemonia Lauterbach, 1972 (Greece)
- Panorpa lachlani Navás, 1930 (Taiwan)
- Panorpa latipennis Hine, 1901 (USA: Connecticut, Massachusetts, Michigan, North Carolina, New Jersey, New York, Ohio, Tennessee, Virginia, Vermont, Wisconsin)
- Panorpa leucoptera Uhler, 1858 (Japan)
- Panorpa lewisi MacLachlan, 1887 (Japan)
- Panorpa liaoi Zhou & Zhou, 2007 (China: Guizhou, Chongqing)
- Panorpa lintienshana Cheng, 1952 (Taiwan)
- Panorpa liui Hua, 1997 (China: Jilin, Liaoning, Heilongjiang, Inner Mongolia)
- Panorpa longicornis Carpenter, 1931 (USA: Kentucky, North Carolina, Tennessee, Virginia)
- Panorpa longiramina Issiki & Cheng, 1947 (Taiwan)
- Panorpa longititilana Issiki, 1929 (Taiwan)
- Panorpa lugubris Swederus, 1787 (USA: Alabama, Florida, Georgia, Louisiana, Mississippi, North Carolina, South Carolina, Virginia)
- Panorpa lutea Carpenter, 1945 (China: Anhui, Zhejiang)
- Panorpa luteola Byers, 2001 (Mexico: Jalisco)
- Panorpa macrostyla Hua, 1998 (China: Jilin, Liaoning)
- Panorpa maculosa Hagen, 1861 (USA: Connecticut, Georgia, Massachusetts, Michigan, North Carolina, New Jersey, New York, Ohio, Pennsylvania, South Carolina, Tennessee, Utah, Virginia)
- Panorpa malaisei Byers, 1999 (Myanmar: Kachin)
- Panorpa mangshanensis Chou & Wang, 1987 (China: Hunan)
- Panorpa meridionalis Rambur, 1842 (Andorra, Spain, France, Italy, Portugal, Romania)

- Panorpa meridionalis fenestrata Navás, 1917 (Spain)
- Panorpa meridionalis germanizans Navás, 1917 (Spain)
- Panorpa meridionalis liberata Navás, 1917 (Spain)

- Panorpa mexicana Banks, 1913 (Mexico: Veracruz)
- Panorpa michoacana Byers, 2011 (Mexico: Michoacan)
- Panorpa mirabilis Carpenter, 1931 (USA: Michigan, New Jersey, New York, Pennsylvania)
- Panorpa mixteca Bicha, 2006 (Mexico: Oaxaca)
- Panorpa miyakeiella Miyamoto, 1985 (Japan)
- Panorpa mokansana Cheng, 1957 (China: Zhejiang)
- Panorpa mucronata Byers, 1996 (Mexico: Hidalgo)
- Panorpa multifasciaria Miyake, 1910 (Japan)
- Panorpa nebulosa Westwood, 1846 (USA (Connecticut, Georgia, Illinois, Kentucky, Massachusetts, Maine, Michigan, Missouri, North Carolina New Hampshire, New Jersey, New York, Ohio, Pennsylvania, South Carolina, Tennessee, Virginia, Vermont, Wisconsin), Canada: Ontario, Quebec)
- Panorpa neglecta Carpenter, 1931 (USA: Alabama, Georgia, Kentucky, Tennessee)
- Panorpa neospinosa Chou & Wang, 1981 (China)
- Panorpa nigrirostris MacLachlan, 1882 (Iran, former USSR)
- Panorpa nipponensis Navás, 1908 (Japan)
- Panorpa nokoensis Issiki, 1929 (Taiwan)
- Panorpa nudiramus Byers, 2002 (Taiwan)

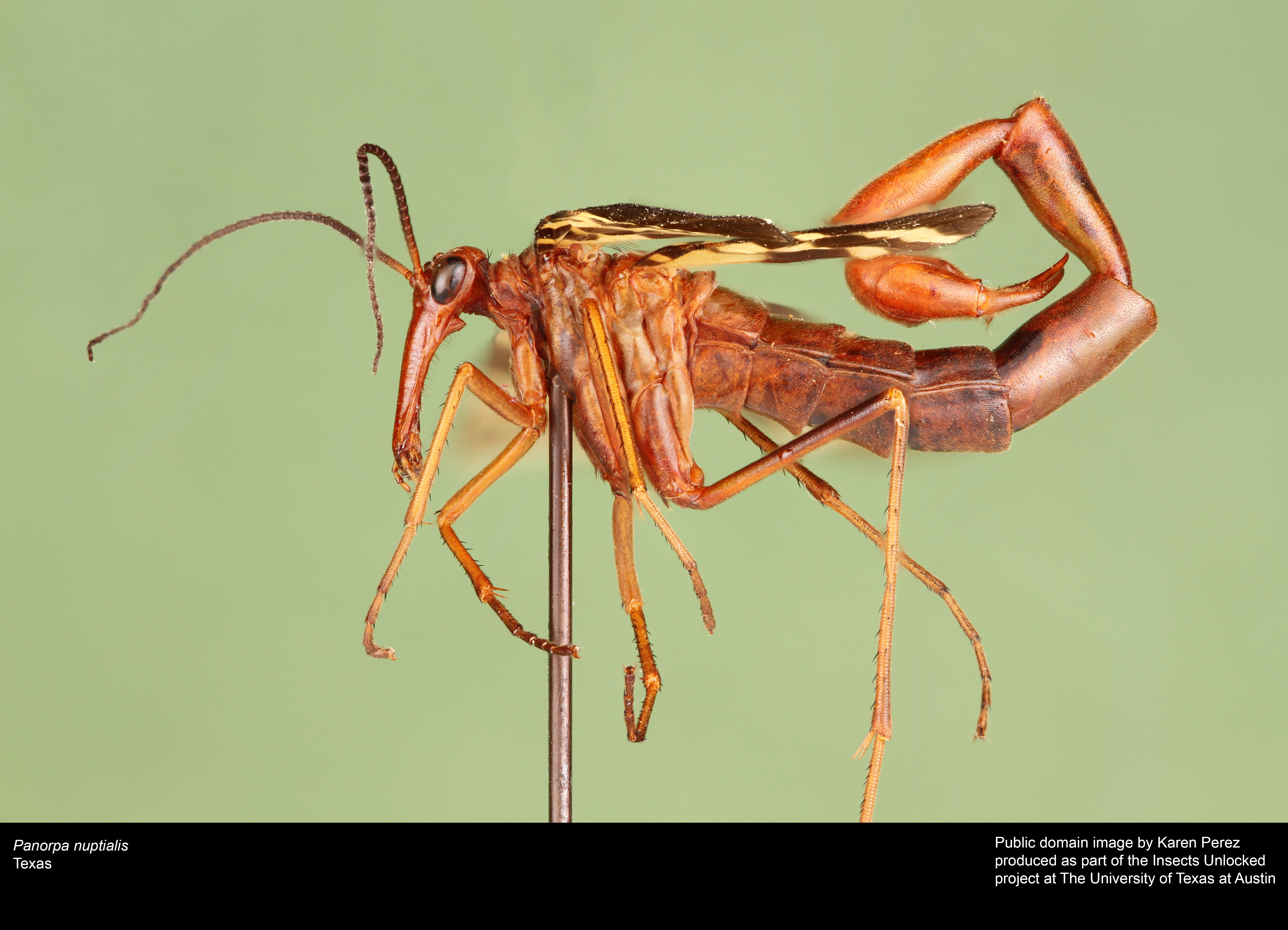
P. nuptialis

- Panorpa nuptialis Gerstaecker, 1863 (USA (Alabama, Arkansas, Kansas, Louisiana, Mississippi, Missouri, Oklahoma, Texas), Mexico)
- Panorpa obliqua Carpenter, 1945 (China: Jiangxi)
- Panorpa obliquifascia Chou & Wang, 1987 (China: Hunan)
- Panorpa ochraceocauda Issiki, 1927 (Taiwan)
- Panorpa ochraceopennis Miyake, 1910 (Japan)
- Panorpa oconee Byers, 1993 (USA: Georgia)
- Panorpa okamotona Issiki, 1927 (Korea)
- Panorpa okinawaensis Nakamura, 2009 (Japan: Okinawa-Jima)
- Panorpa orientalis MacLachlan, 1887 (Korea, Russia)
- Panorpa pachymera Byers, 1993 (USA: Georgia, South Carolina)
- Panorpa pallidimaculata Issiki, 1929 (Taiwan)
- Panorpa palustris Byers, 1958 (USA: North Carolina, Virginia)
- Panorpa parallela Wang & Hua, 2016 (China: Yunnan)
- Panorpa pectinata Issiki, 1929 (Taiwan)
- Panorpa penicillata Byers, 1962 (Mexico: Durango)
- Panorpa pennyi Byers, 2013 (Mexico: Hidalgo)
- Panorpa peterseana Issiki, 1927 (Taiwan)
- Panorpa picta Hagen, 1863 (Turkey)
- Panorpa pieli Cheng, 1957 (China: Jiangxi)
- Panorpa pieperi Willmann, 1975 (Turkey)
- Panorpa pingjiangensis Chou & Wang, 1987 (China)
- Panorpa planicola Byers, 1993 (USA: South Carolina)
- Panorpa plitvicensis Lauterbach, 1972 (Yugoslavia)
- Panorpa pryeri McLachlan, 1875 (Japan)
- Panorpa pseudoalpina Nagler, 1970 (Romania)
- Panorpa punctata Klug, 1838 (Mexico)
- Panorpa pura Klapálek, 1906 (Europe, Asia)
- Panorpa pusilla Cheng, 1949 (China: Shaansi)
- Panorpa qiana Zhou & Zhou, 2010 (Taiwan)
- Panorpa qinlingensis Chou & Ran, 1981 (China: Shaanxi)
- Panorpa quadrifasciata Chou & Wang, 1987 (China: Hubei, Hunan, Guangxi)
- Panorpa ramosa Byers, 1996 (Mexico: Hidalgo)
- Panorpa rantaisanensis Issiki, 1929 (Taiwan)
- Panorpa reclusa Byers, 1996 (Mexico: Hidalgo)
- Panorpa reflexa Wang & Hua, 2016 (China: Yunnan)
- Panorpa robusta Carpenter, 1931 (USA: Georgia, South Carolina)
- Panorpa rosemaria Bicha & Schiff, 2019 (USA: Dry Ridge, Grant County, Kentucky)
- Panorpa rufa Gray, 1832 (USA: Alabama, Florida, Georgia, Mississippi, North Carolina, South Carolina)
- Panorpa rufescens Rambur, 1842 (USA: Connecticut, Washington, Massachusetts, Maryland, Michigan, New Hampshire, New Jersey, New York, Pennsylvania, Rhode Island)
- Panorpa rufostigma Westwood, 1846 (Albania)
- Panorpa rupeculana Byers, 1993 (USA: Arkansas, Louisiana, Mississippi)
- Panorpa schweigeri Willmann, 1975 (Turkey)
- Panorpa scopulifera Byers, 1993 (USA: Georgia, South Carolina)
- Panorpa semifasciata Cheng, 1949 (China: Sichuan)
- Panorpa sentosa Byers, 1997 (Mexico: San Luis Potosi)
- Panorpa serta Byers, 1996 (Mexico: Michoacan)
- Panorpa setifera Webb, 1974 (USA: Wisconsin)
- Panorpa sexspinosa Cheng, 1949 (China: Shaanxi)

- Panorpa sexspinosa zhongnanensis Chou & Wang, 1981 (China: Shaanxi)

- Panorpa sextaenia Zhou & Bao, 2002 (China: Guangxi, Guizhou)
- Panorpa shanyangensis Chou & Wang, 1981 (China: Shaanxi)
- Panorpa shibatai Issiki, 1929 (Taiwan)
- Panorpa sibirica Esben-Petersen, 1915 (Russia: Far East)
- Panorpa sigmoides Carpenter, 1931 (USA: Iowa, Illinois, Indiana, Minnesota, Ohio, Wisconsin)
- Panorpa similis Esben-Petersen, 1915 (former USSR)
- Panorpa sonani Issiki, 1929 (Taiwan)
- Panorpa songes Zhou & Zhou, 2005 (China: Guizhou)
- Panorpa speciosa Carpenter, 1931 (USA: Iowa, Illinois, Indiana, Kentucky, Minnesota, Missouri, Wisconsin)
- Panorpa stigmalis Navás, 1908 (China: Sichuan)
- Panorpa stigmosa Zhou, 2006 (China: Guizhou)
- Panorpa striata Miyake, 1908 (Japan)
- Panorpa subambra Chou & Tong, 1987 (China: Hunan)
- Panorpa subaurea Chou & Li, 1987 (China: Hunan)
- Panorpa subfurcata Westwood, 1842 (USA (Massachusetts, Maine, Michigan, Minnesota, New Jersey, New York, Pennsylvania, Virginia, Wisconsin, West Virginia), Canada: Nova Scotia, Ontario, Quebec)
- Panorpa submaculosa Carpenter, 1931 (USA: Georgia, Indiana, Kentucky, Maryland, Michigan, New York, Ohio, Pennsylvania, South Carolina, Tennessee, Utah, Wisconsin)
- Panorpa subulifera Byers, 1962 (USA: Virginia)
- Panorpa susteri Nagler, 1970 (Romania)
- Panorpa taiheisanensis Issiki, 1929 (Taiwan)
- Panorpa taiwanensis Issiki, 1929 (Taiwan)
- Panorpa takenouchii Miyake, 1908 (Japan)
- Panorpa tatvana Willmann, 1974 (Turkey)

- Panorpa tatvana ressli Willmann, 1975 (Turkey)

- Panorpa tecta Byers, 2002 (Taiwan)
- Panorpa terminata Klug, 1838 (Mexico: Morelos)
- Panorpa tetrazonia Navás, 1935 (China: Anhui, Jiangxi)
- Panorpa tetrazonia Navás, 1935 (China: Anhui, Jiangxi)
- Panorpa teziutlana Byers, 2011 (Mexico: Puebla)
- Panorpa thompsoni Cheng, 1957 (Japan: Tsushima)
- Panorpa thrakica Willmann, 1976 (European Turkey)
- Panorpa titschacki Esben-Petersen, 1934 (Greece)
- Panorpa tokunoshimaensis Nakamura, 2009 (Japan: Tokuno-Shima)
- Panorpa tribulosa Byers, 2000 (Mexico: Puebla)
- Panorpa trifasciata Cheng, 1957 (China: Fujian)
- Panorpa tritaenia Chou & Li, 1987 (China: Hunan)
- Panorpa trizonata Miyake, 1908 (Japan)
- Panorpa truncata Byers, 1997 (Mexico: Jalisco)
- Panorpa tsunekatanis Issiki, 1929 (Japan)
- Panorpa tsushimaensis Miyamoto, 1979 (Japan)
- Panorpa turcica Willmann, 1975 (Turkey)

- Panorpa turcica anatolica Willmann, 1975 (Turkey)
- Panorpa turcica pontica Willmann, 1975 (Turkey)

- Panorpa typicoides Cheng, 1949 (China: Sichuan)
- Panorpa ultima Byers, 2013 (Mexico: Michoacan)
- Panorpa umbricola Bicha, 2006 (Mexico: Jalisco)
- Panorpa venosa Westwood, 1846 (USA: Georgia)
- Panorpa vernalis Byers, 1973 (USA: Arkansas, Louisiana, Mississippi)
- Panorpa virginica Banks, 1906 (USA: Connecticut, Georgia, North Carolina, New Jersey, South Carolina, Tennessee, Virginia)
- Panorpa vulgaris Imhoff & Labram, 1845 (Europe, Asia)
- Panorpa waongkehzengi Navás, 1935 (China: Jiangxi)
- Panorpa wormaldi MacLachlan, 1875 (Japan)
- Panorpa wrightae Cheng, 1957 (China: Zhejiang)
- Panorpa yangi Chou, 1981 (China: Shaanxi)
- Panorpa yiei Issiki & Cheng, 1947 (Taiwan)
- Panorpa youngi Byers, 1994 (Taiwan)
