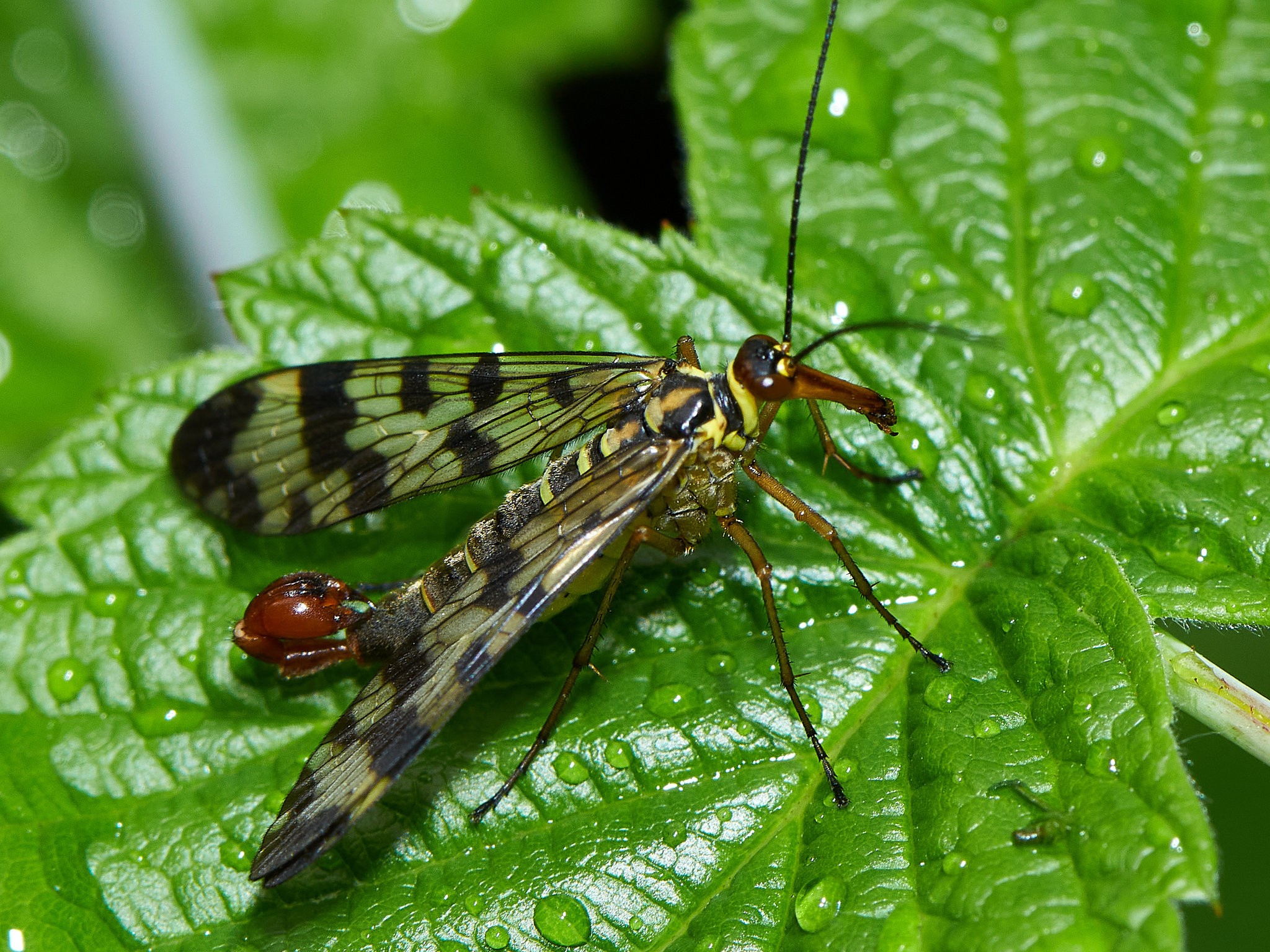

Scientific classification
- Kingdom: Animalia
- Phylum: Arthropoda
- Clade: Pancrustacea
- Class: Insecta
- Order: Mecoptera
- Family: Panorpidae
- Genus: Panorpa
- Species: P. vulgaris

Binomial name
- Panorpa vulgaris Imhoff & Labram, 1845

= Panorpa vulgaris =

Species of insect

Panorpa vulgaris, also known by its common name meadow scorpionfly is a species from the genus Panorpa. The species was first described in 1845.

== Distribution and habitat ==
P. vulgaris are commonly distributed throughout central Europe. They prefer dry and warm habitats that provide shade at high temperatures and are most abundant along the edges of low-lying shrubs. Despite their environmental preference, smaller populations do occur in forested areas that experience moist and cool conditions.

== Physiology ==
=== Vision ===
Meadow scorpionfly larvae have stemmata. In adult individuals the cytoplasm of their neuron cells located within the eye become reduced with aging, resulting in decreased vision

=== Flight ===
Adult individuals are often considered weak flyers due to deterioration of tissues with increasing age. Flight musculature degenerates over time due to the combination of deformed mitochondria and hypertrophy of connective tissues.

=== Immunity ===
In early developmental stages larvae decrease their amount of hemocytes when transitioning into pupae. This is hypothesized by the distribution of resources to reproductive structures. Females are considered to have better immunity. Females have higher amounts of hemocytes and increased lysosomal activity in their hemolymph compared to males.

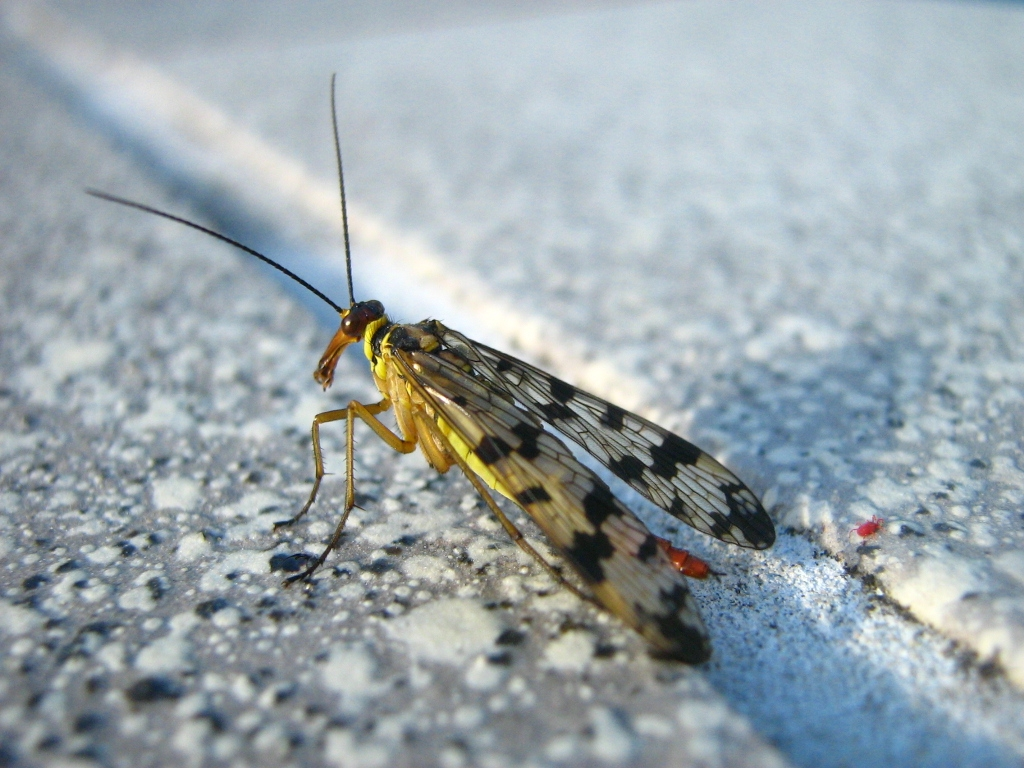
Female Meadow Scorpionfly

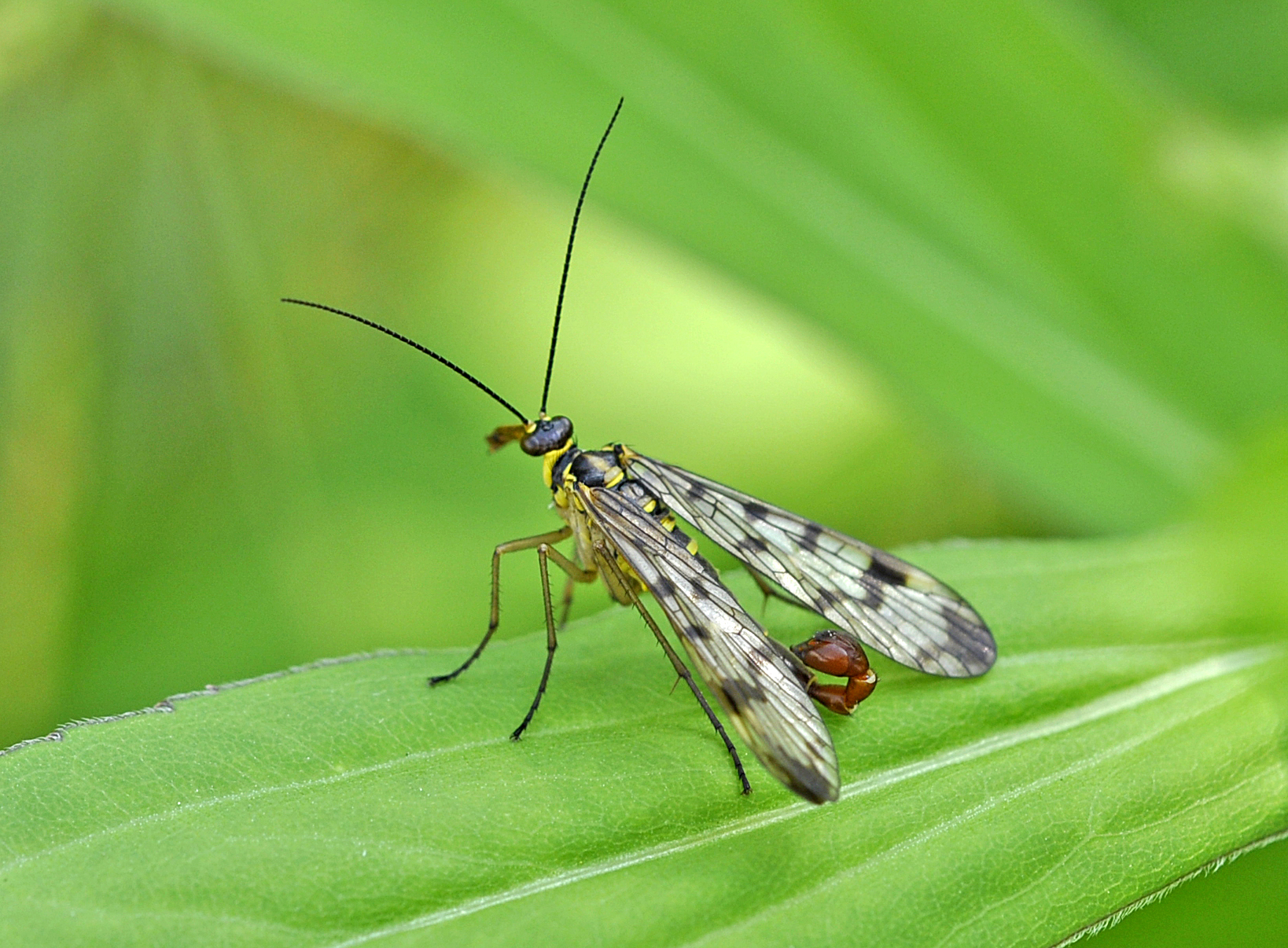
Male Meadow Scorpionfly

== Nutrition ==
Individuals of both sexes are capable of foraging for food, they are heavily influenced by their environments. Intraspecific and interspecific competition is common between and within both sexes when food sources are limited. Both larvae and adults typically feed on dead arthropods, and adults are often kleptoparasites of spider webs. Adults are generally capable of avoiding spiderwebs when feeding on prey. Males will use their genital claspers and females will use their abdomens to remove prey from spider webs and will even strike spiders who attempt to interfere with them.

== Life cycle ==
The meadow scorpionfly develops two separate generations per year, one generation that undergoes overwintering in early spring and another that experiences a diapause free-developing stage in the summer. During their lifecycle individuals can survive up to two months.^{]}

== Mating ==
Females meadow scorpionflies are known to be polyandrous, allowing them to make multiple mating attempts with numerous males. Some females have shown evidence of being capable of mating with up to nine different males. During mating, males will attach themselves to one of the females forewings with their genital claspers to remain connected until copulation is complete. Male meadow scorpionflies provide nuptial gifts for their female counterparts. The gifts males provide are a series of salivary secretions and different types of carrion that the females will ingest as a nutrient source. In the males first generation salivary secretions are the main source of nuptial gifting. During the second generation male salivary protein structures become depleted, resulting in the use of carrion. These nuptial gifts are both a mating effort and a form of paternal investment. The duration of copulation between males and females is determined by the amount of saliva a male is able to produce. While mating males will continuously transfer sperm to females until nuptial gifts are completely consumed. The sperm transferred by males will eventually compete with other ejaculates from other males by the means of the raffle principle. Since saliva production is a significant energy investment, it can be a quality indicator of male health. Females will further discriminate between different males based on the amount of saliva provided. The amount of saliva a female receives during mating directly influences the amount of offspring she is able to produce. Males will also be selective of females based on the amount of offspring a female will be able to produce. Inherently, males are capable of influencing the quality or the amount of ejaculate that they provide to females based on their bias.
