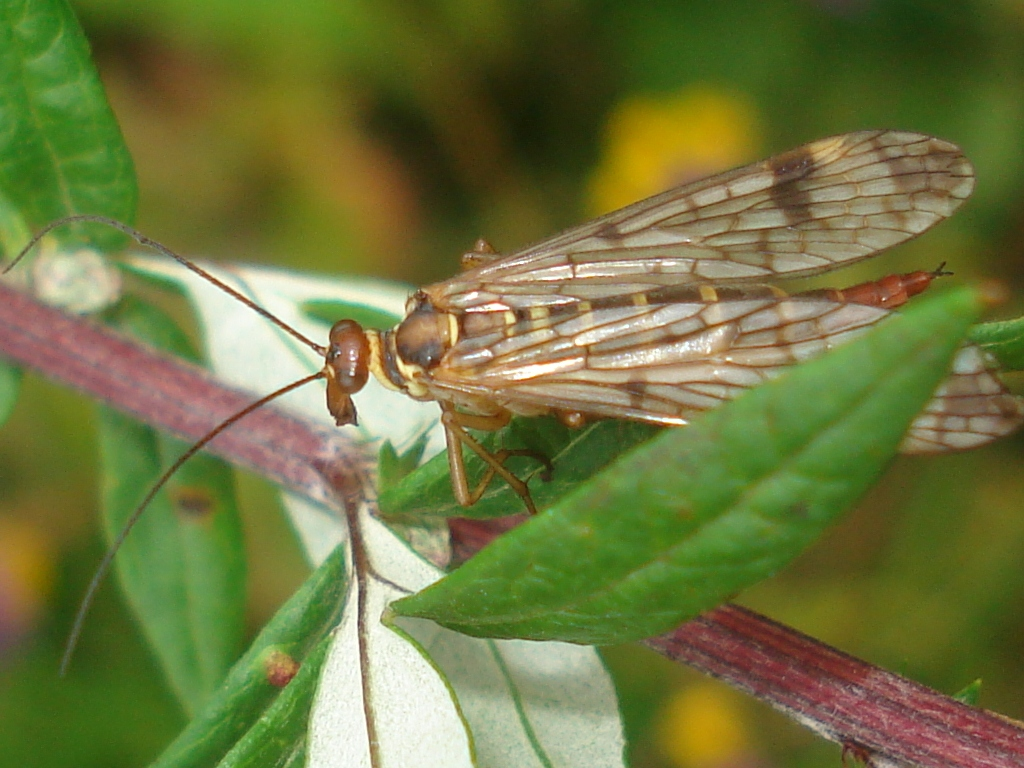
- Female
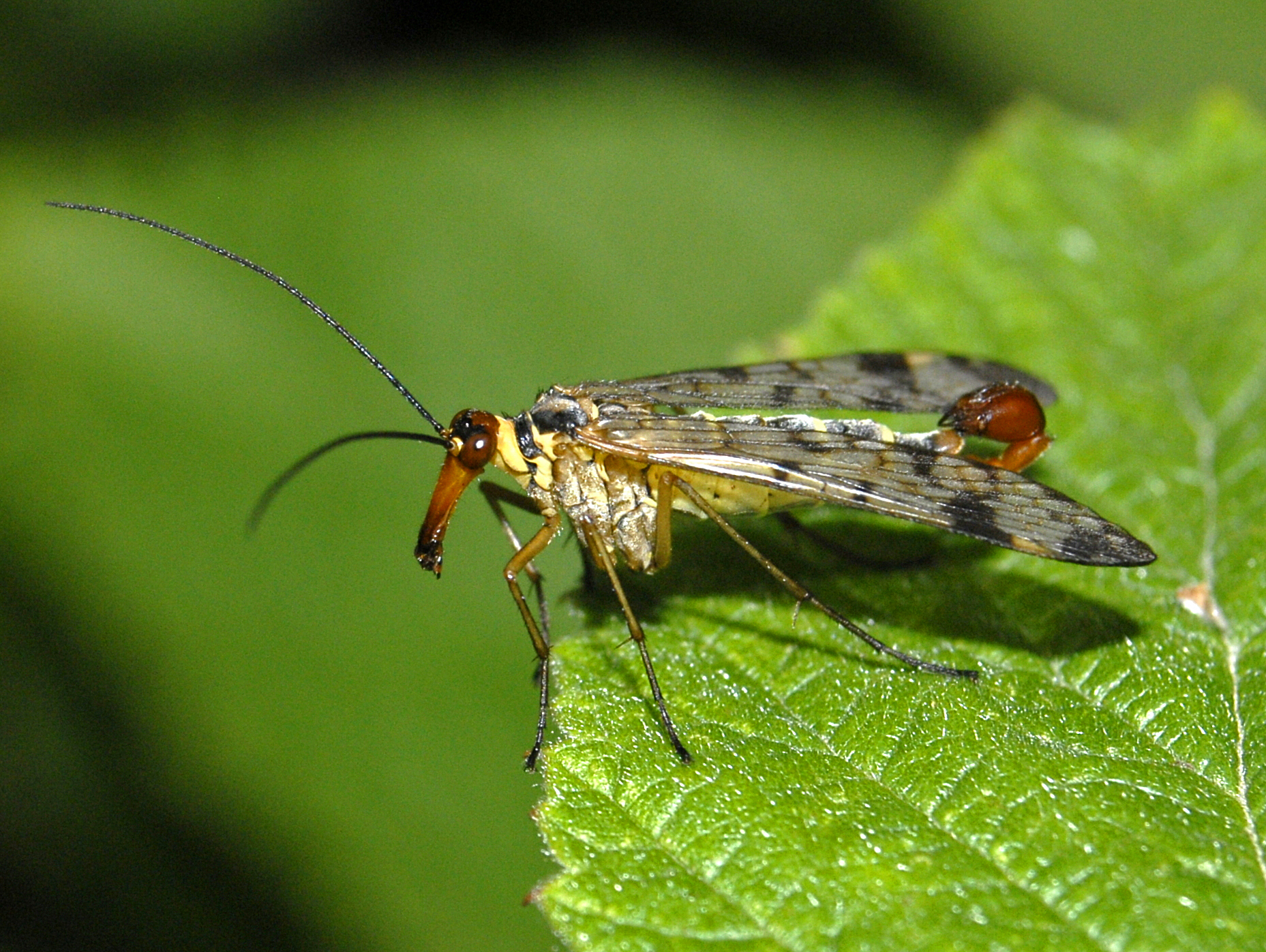
- Male

Scientific classification
- Kingdom: Animalia
- Phylum: Arthropoda
- Clade: Pancrustacea
- Class: Insecta
- Order: Mecoptera
- Family: Panorpidae
- Genus: Panorpa
- Species: P. cognata

Binomial name
- Panorpa cognata Rambur, 1842

= Panorpa cognata =

Species of insect

Panorpa cognata is a species of scorpionfly belonging to the family Panorpidae.

== Subspecies ==
Subspecies include:

- Panorpa cognata cognata Rambur, 1842
- Panorpa cognata ghilianii MacLachlan, 1869
- Panorpa cognata osellai Willmann, 1976

== Distribution and habitat ==
This species can be found across the British Isles (but not Ireland), western Europe into Russia and Northern Asia (excluding China). They usually inhabit hedges and woods.

== Description ==
Panorpa cognata has a fore-wing length ranging between 10 and 15mm, and are orange-brown in colour, sometimes with black colouration along the posterior margin, the base of the antennae, sometimes the pronotum. True to their name, males have an oval-shaped genital bulb, resembling that of a scorpion's stinger.

In these slender, small insects the back part of the head (occiput) is reddish, while in all other species it is usually black. Wings are membranous with black markings. The abdomen is black and yellow striped with an orange extremity. In males the sixth abdominal segment is square and appendages are divergent.

== Biology ==
Larvae and adults mainly feed on dead insects and carrion. Adults are visible from May to July.

== As a model organism ==
P. cognata has been used as a model organism for investigating sexual selection; effects of conditions on female choice and male mating behaviours, cryptic sexual selection, and effects of multiple mates on fecundity and egg hatching. Female P. cognata are polyandrous, allowing females greater access to resources, in the form of salivary nuptial gifts from multiple mates, increased genetic variation in her offspring, and resulting in a greater success of eggs hatching compared to monandrous females Polyandry results in a high incidence of sperm competition, and males compete for the ability to mate with females. Male P. cognata do not compete directly, and do not guard or restrict females, but attract potential mates through pheromones; initiating copulation with a salivary nuptial gift following a premating display that can sometimes last hours in length.

Condition of both female and male P. cognata ultimately play a role in a successful copulation. Once copulation is initiated, sperm transfer is maintained at a constant, linear rate, indicating that longer copulation periods allow for the transfer of more sperm, however, individual males have significantly varying rates of sperm transfer. Copulation duration is directly linked to the size of the salivary nuptial gift presented to the female, with larger salivary gifts resulting in copulations of longer duration, and a greater number of sperm transferred. At the beginning of the breeding seasons, males are more particular in mate choice, choosing to expend more energy attracting and mating with females of good condition, while by the end of the breeding season, males are less picky towards female condition, and breed more indiscriminately.

=== Male reproductive investment ===
Investment in reproduction is costly for male P. cognata, as they must “woo” females, and eventually produce a salivary mass to initiate copulation. Once copulation has begun, sperm transfer itself is costly, as well. Sperm is transferred into the female via a sperm pump, which has two thick muscles, one on either side of the pump. Nutrient availability during the larval stage affects adult body weight, and the development of the males' salivary glands. Males with restricted access to nutrients in larval stage have reduced mating success compared to those of good condition with access to greater amounts of nutrients in the larval stage. Males of lower condition have less resources to produce nuptial gifts, resulting in smaller salivary masses, shorter mating duration, and less sperm transferred. To counteract their poor condition, males tend to have a longer premating duration than those of higher condition. Males of higher condition tend to have shorter premating periods and larger nuptial gifts. Premating rituals do not always finish in successful copulation, females abandon the male courting her for better, more attractive mates. Male P. cognata regulate their mating investment according to the amount of sperm competition. Female P. cognata store sperm from each male she mates with, and each consecutive mate has the ability to assess how much sperm she is storing, thus down-adjusting the male's investment in copulation with a female who has more sperm stored.

=== Female reproductive investment ===
The condition of female P. cognata, dictated by nutritional availability in the larval stage, is positively correlated with the number of sperm transferred during copulation, with males transferring sperm to females in good condition at a faster rate than they would transfer to females of poor condition. Females control the duration of copulation, which is directly affected by the size of the salivary nuptial gift provided by the male. The species, P. cognata, benefits as a whole from the female mating with multiple males and ingesting multiple salivary nuptial gifts, as each salivary mass a female ingests has been shown to have, on average, a positive 8% increase on the number of eggs she lays. The duration of copulation impacts the female's length of time between rematings; longer copulations result in a longer period between matings.
