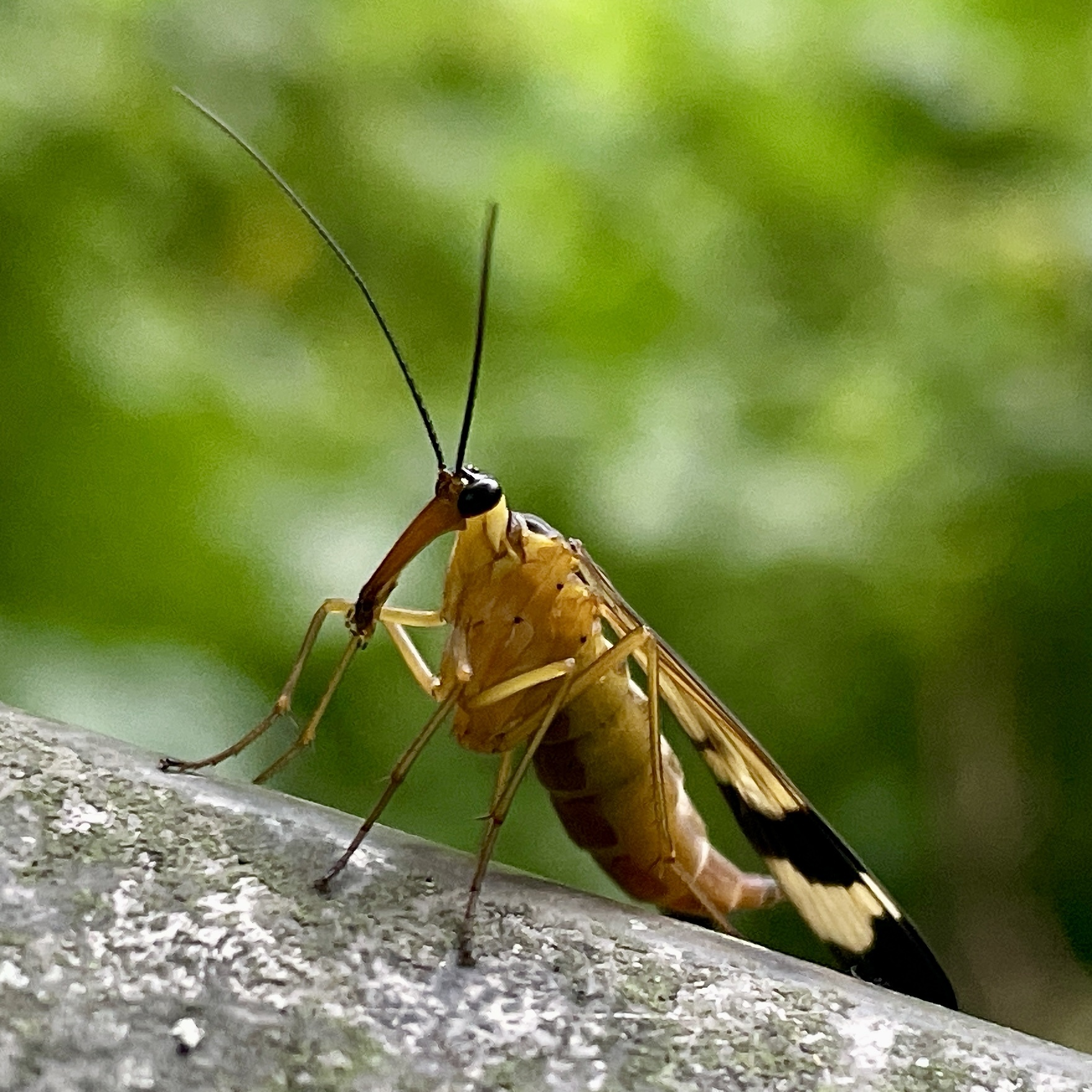

Scientific classification
- Kingdom: Animalia
- Phylum: Arthropoda
- Clade: Pancrustacea
- Class: Insecta
- Order: Mecoptera
- Family: Panorpidae
- Genus: Panorpa
- Species: P. japonica

Binomial name
- Panorpa japonica (Thunberg, 1784)

= Panorpa japonica =

Species of insect

Panorpa japonica, the common Japanese scorpionfly, is recognized for its translucent wings with two black bands. It has a sleek, entirely black body and a distinctive curved snout as long as its thorax. Its long, thread-like black antennae nearly match the length of its body. It is a species from the genus Panorpa. It was originally described by Carl Peter Thunberg in 1784.

Females of Panorpa japonica prefer the pheromone of males with low fluctuating asymmetry of the forewing. Low fluctuating asymmetry frequently correlates with individual fitness components such as growth, fecundity or survival. Thus female choice of mate should produce more fit offspring than random mating.

== Distribution ==
Panorpa japonica has primarily been observed in Japan. This is confirmed by crowd-sourcing initiatives or data aggregation services.
