= Panorpa rufa =

Scientific classification
- Kingdom: Animalia
- Phylum: Arthropoda
- Clade: Pancrustacea
- Class: Insecta
- Order: Mecoptera
- Family: Panorpidae
- Genus: Panorpa
- Species: P. rufa

Binomial name
- Panorpa rufa Gray, 1832

Species of insect

Panorpa rufa, the red scorpionfly, is a species of scorpionfly in the family Panorpidae. It is found in the southeastern United States from southern North Carolina south to northern Florida, and westward to eastern Mississippi.
