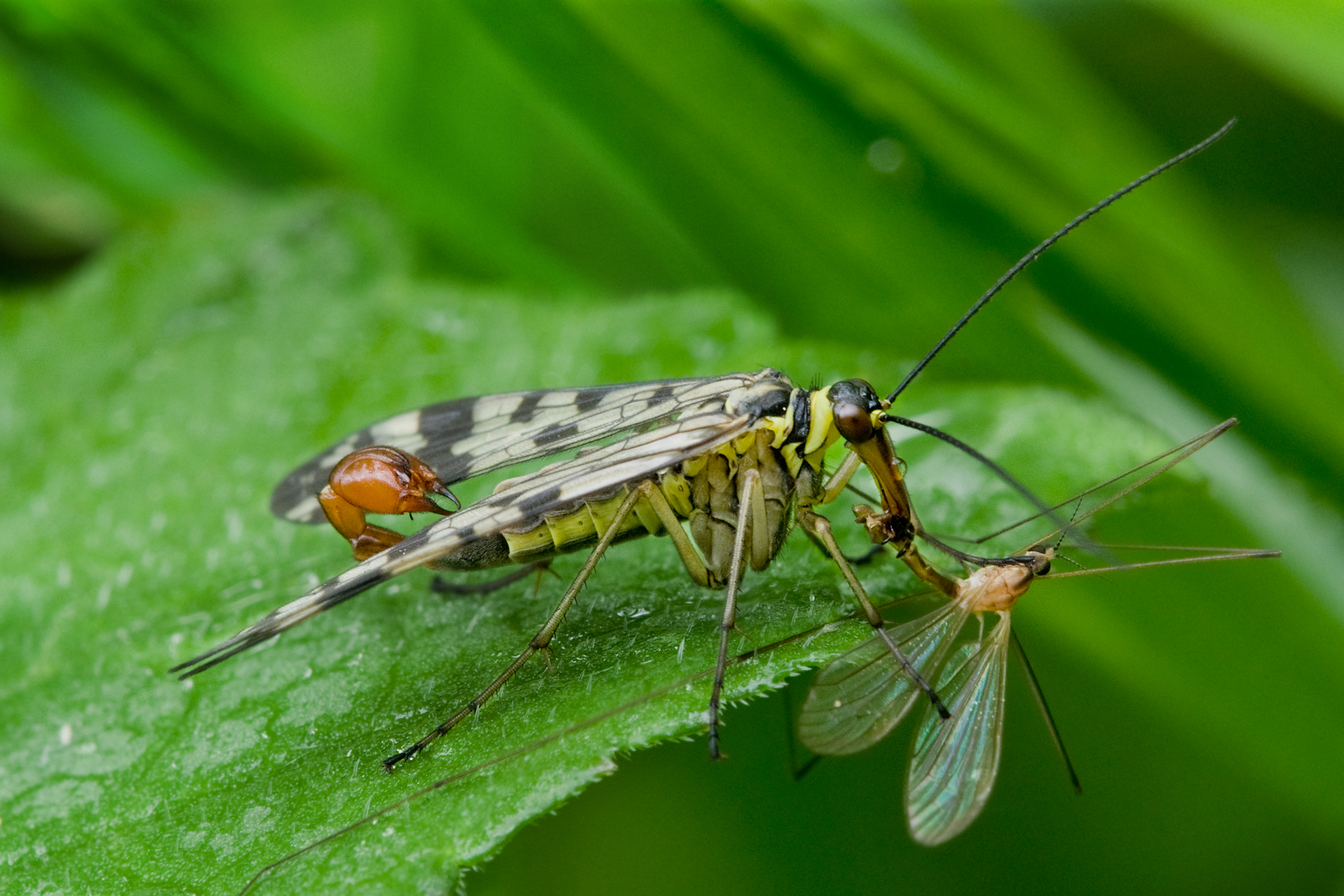
- P. communis male with prey
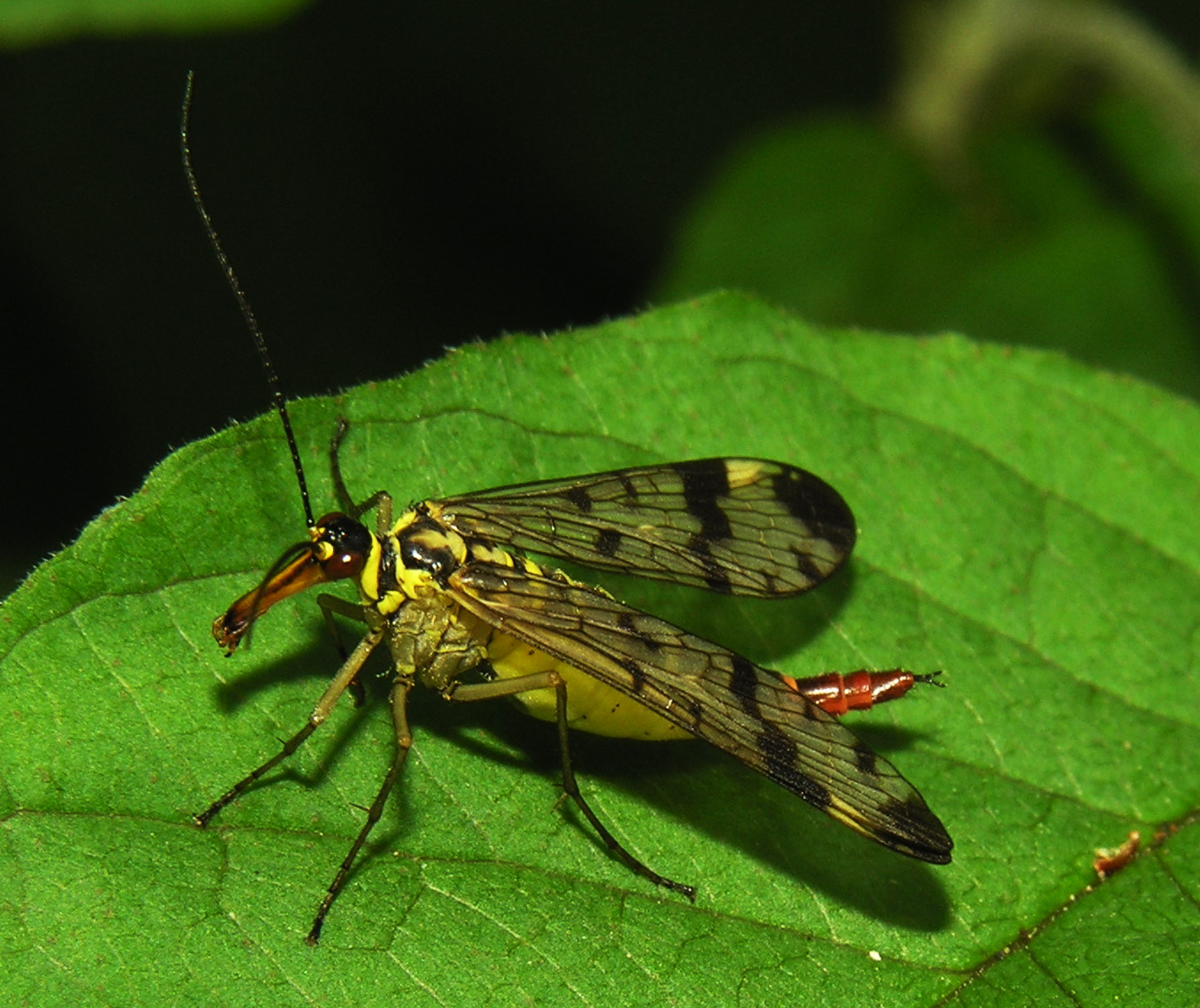
- P. communis female

Conservation status
- Least Concern (IUCN 3.1)

Scientific classification
- Kingdom: Animalia
- Phylum: Arthropoda
- Clade: Pancrustacea
- Class: Insecta
- Order: Mecoptera
- Family: Panorpidae
- Genus: Panorpa
- Species: P. communis

Binomial name
- Panorpa communis Linnaeus, 1758

= Panorpa communis =

Common scorpionfly

Species of insect

Panorpa communis, the common scorpionfly, is a species of scorpionfly.

== Distribution ==
This species is native to Europe (except Iceland and Ireland) and Northern Asia (except China).

== Habitat ==
These scorpionflies can be usually found in hedgerows and patches of nettle.

== Description ==
Panorpa communis can reach a body length of about 30 millimetres (1.2 in). The common scorpionfly has a black and yellow body, with a reddish head and tail. The male has a pair of claspers at the end of its tail (for holding the female during mating), giving it a scorpion-like appearance, although it is not a stinger.

The adult insect has a wingspan of about 35 millimetres (1.4 in), with wings that are mostly clear, but have many dark spots or patches. Its head, mounted with large eyes, is drawn into a prominent, downward pointing beak, which opens at the tip of its head. Females are longer, heavier, and have longer legs than males.

In the female, the eighth abdominal segment is the shortest, almost twice shorter than the seventh; the sixth is narrowed towards the back. The larva resembles a caterpillar and grows up to 20 millimetres (0.79 in) long. It has three pairs of thoracic legs and eight pairs of prolegs.

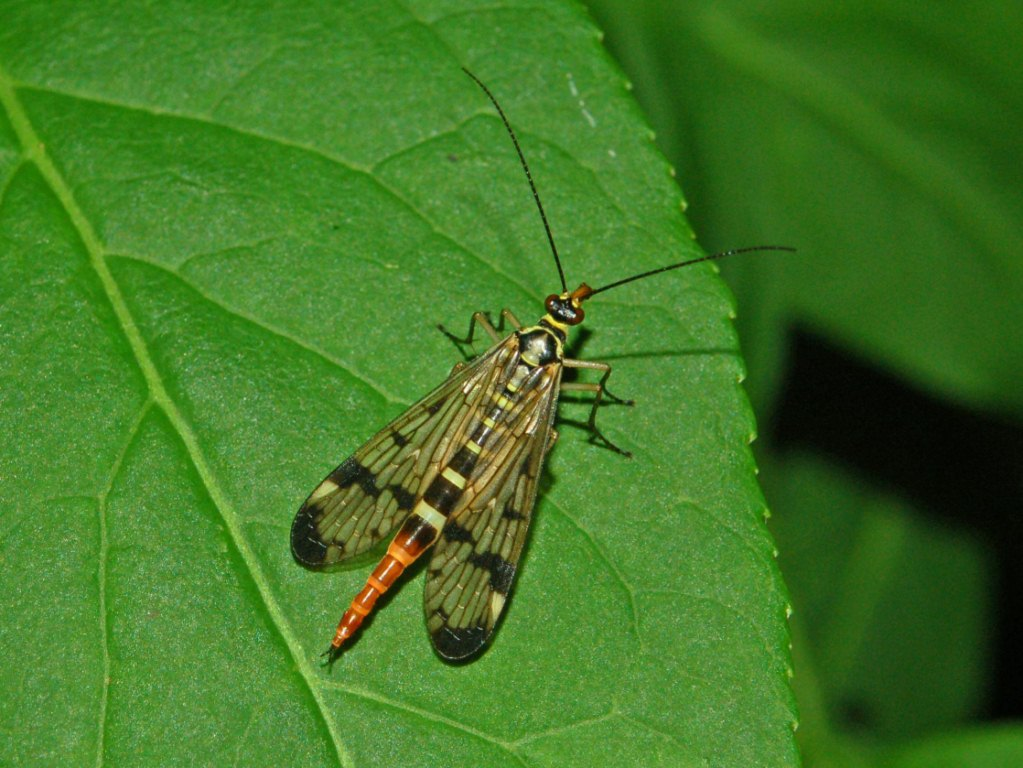
Female, dorsal view

== Biology and habits ==
The adult is seen between May and September. They eat dead insects (although they sometimes eat live aphids), sometimes taking them from spider webs, and plant sap.

Although fully winged, the adults rarely fly very far and spend much of their time crawling on vegetation in damp, shaded places near water and along hedgerows. Panorpa communis is a univoltine species. Eggs are laid in soil annually and the larvae both scavenge and pupate there.

== Mating behavior ==
Males release pheromones and offer nuptial gifts to females in the form of saliva secretions and nuptial prey (usually dead arthropods). Before offering the nuptial gifts, the male and female, perform ritualized premating behavior, which includes slow wing movements, accompanied by brief sequences of rapid vibrations from their abdomen. The mating success of females increases with the size of nuptial gifts offered by the male.

== Gallery ==
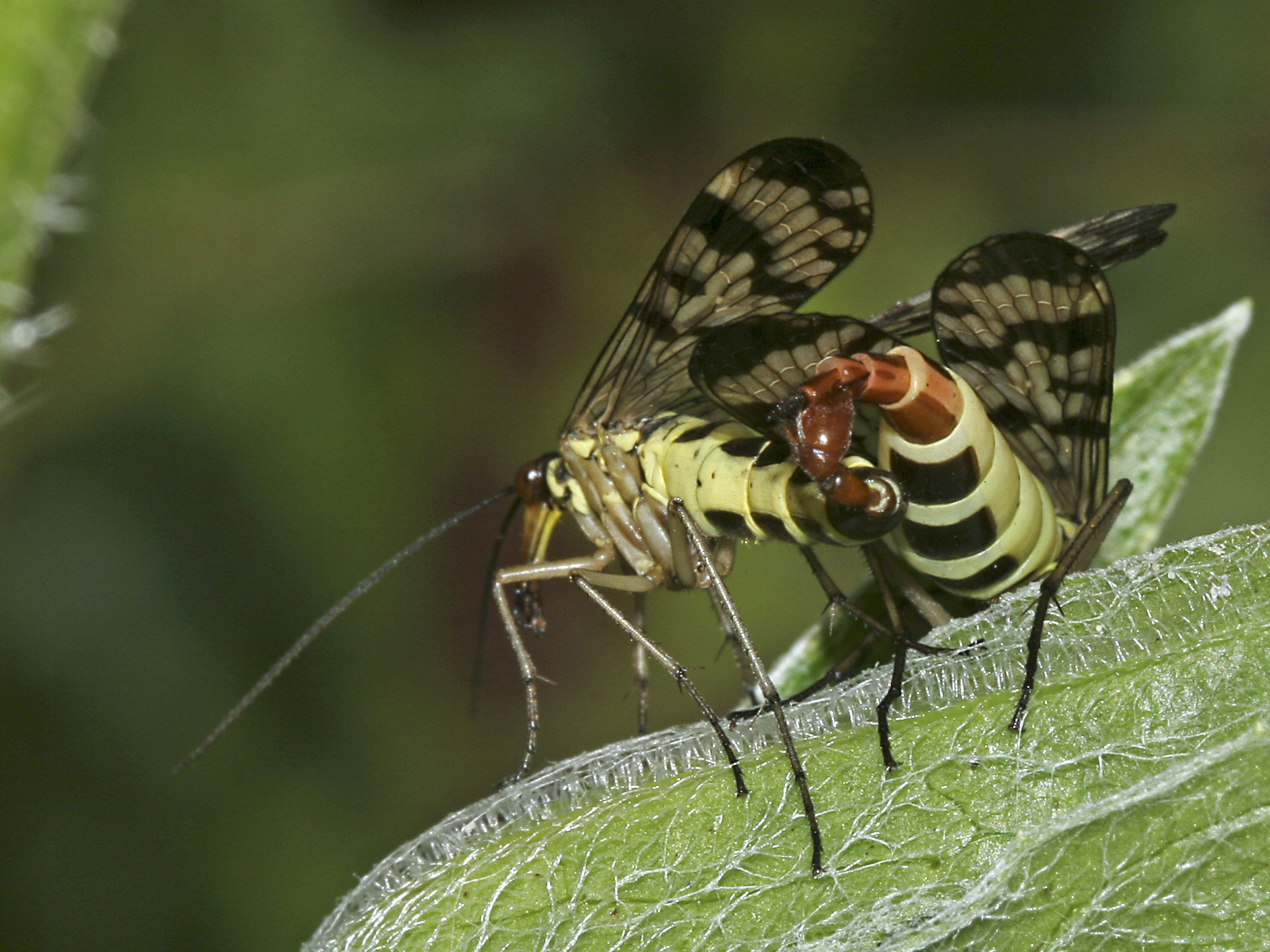
Mating (female on the right)

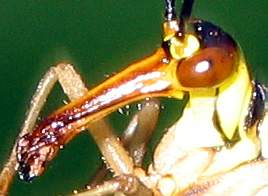
Head detail

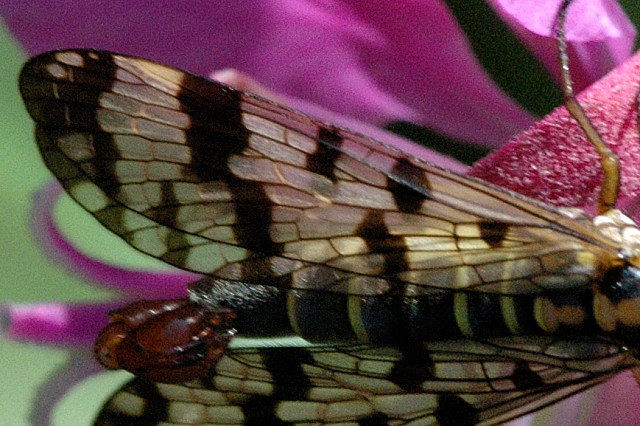
Wing detail

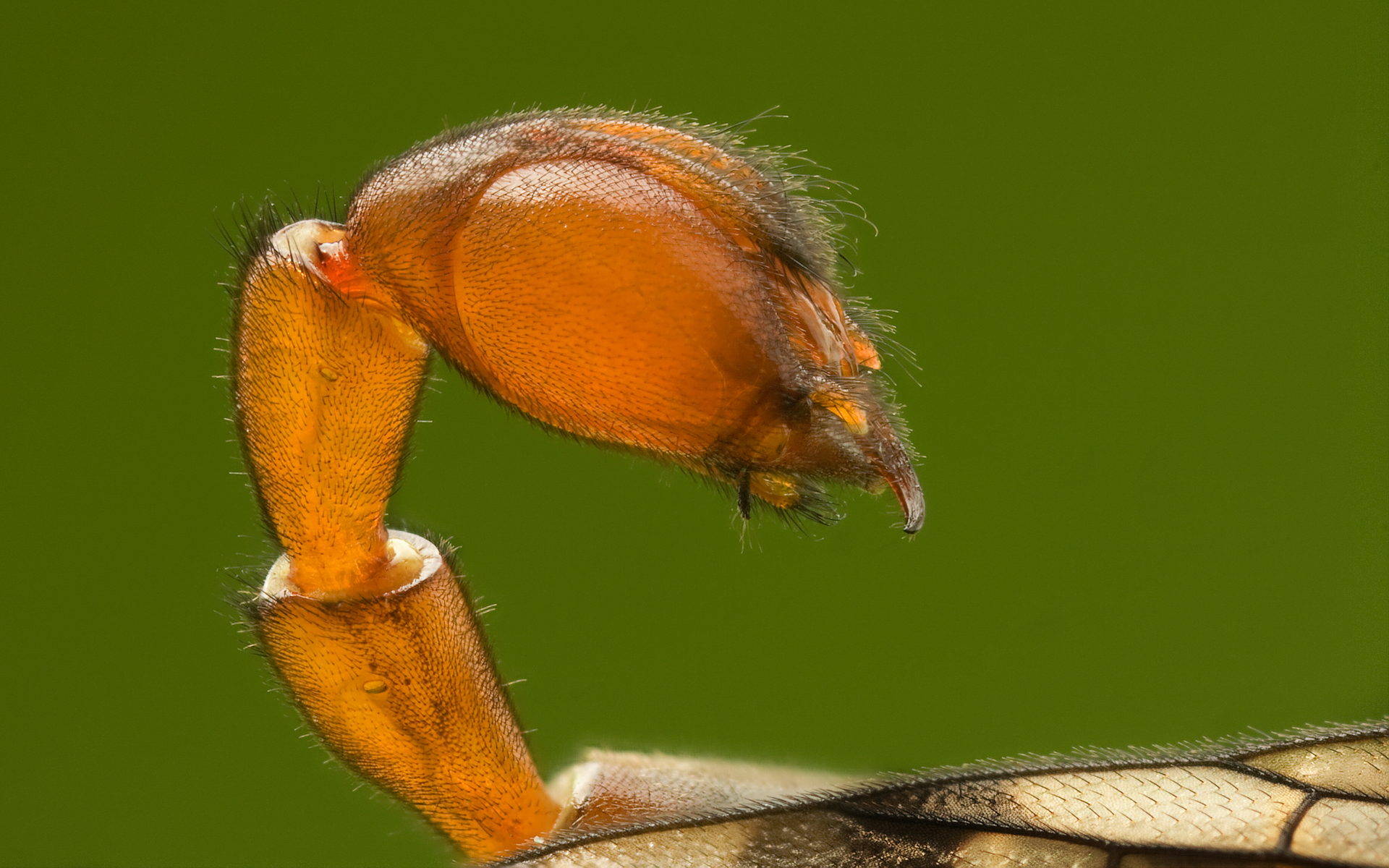
Male genitalia

Video clip
