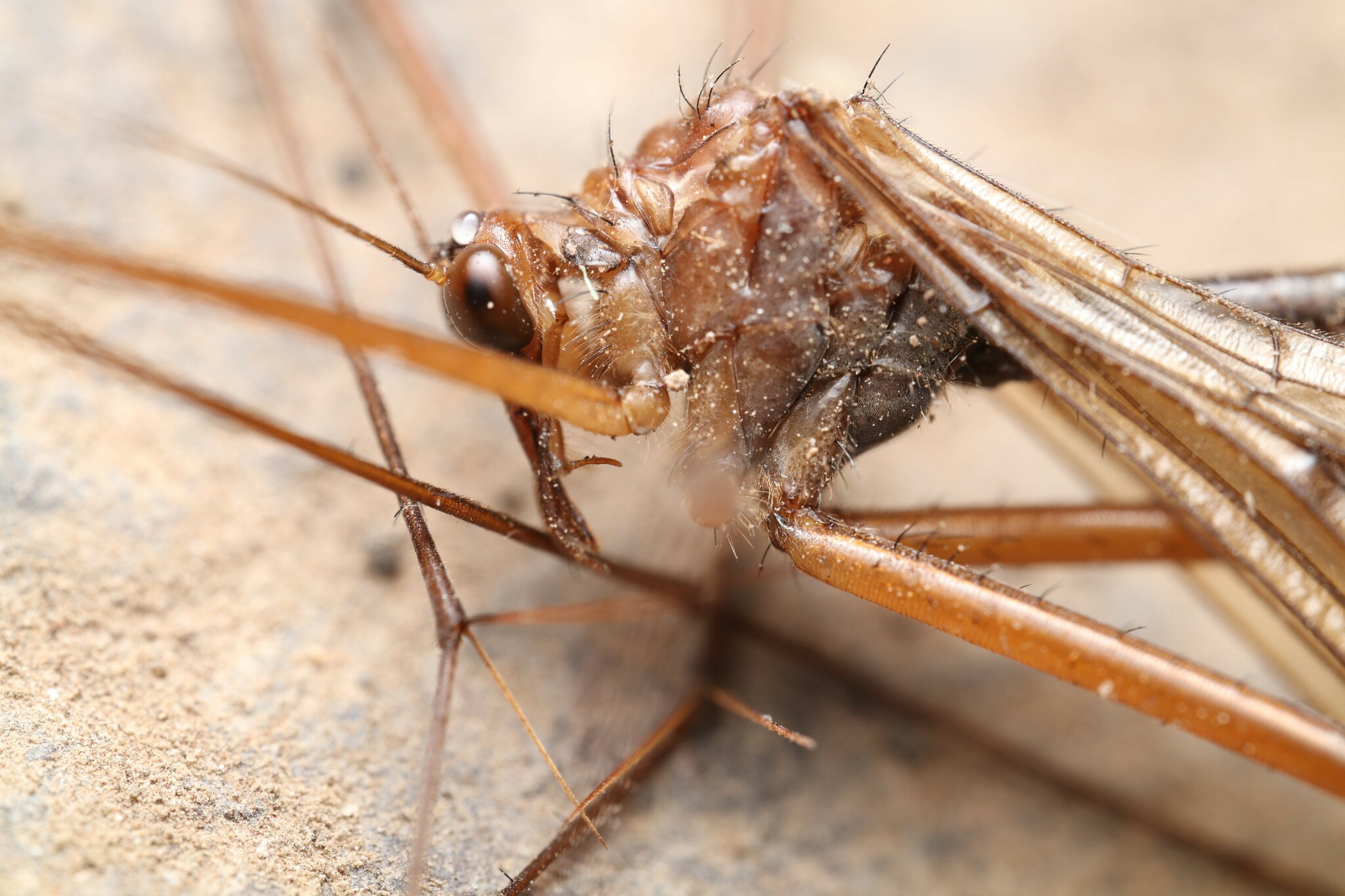
- Bittacus chilensis

Scientific classification
- Kingdom: Animalia
- Phylum: Arthropoda
- Class: Insecta
- Clade: Antliophora
- Clade: Pistillifera; R. Willman 1987

Families
- Panorpoidea; †Australochoristidae; †Austropanorpidae; †Cantabridae; †Dinopanorpidae; †Eorpidae; †Holcorpidae; †Orthophlebiidae; Panorpidae (common scorpionflies); Panorpodidae (short-faced scorpionflies); †Protorthophlebiidae; †Worcestobiidae; Raptipedia; Bittacidae (hangingflies); †Cimbrophlebiidae

= Pistillifera =

Suborder of insects

Pistillifera is a suborder of endopterygote insects within the Mecoptera that contains the scorpionflies and hangingflies. It was described by R. Willmann in 1987.
