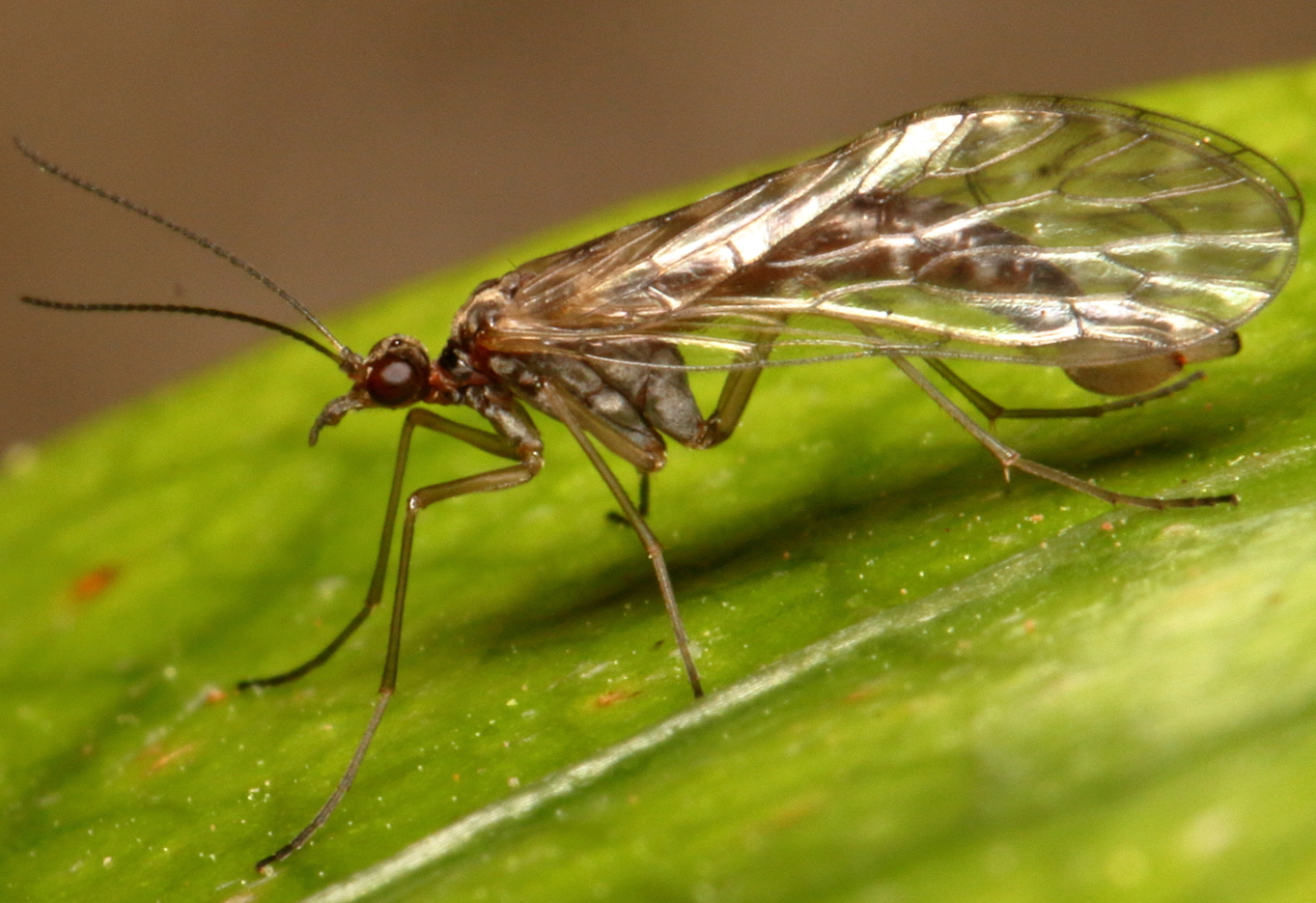

Conservation status
- Not Threatened (NZ TCS)

Scientific classification
- Kingdom: Animalia
- Phylum: Arthropoda
- Clade: Pancrustacea
- Class: Insecta
- Order: Mecoptera
- Family: Nannochoristidae
- Genus: Nannochorista
- Species: N. philpotti

Binomial name
- Nannochorista philpotti (Tillyard, 1917)

Synonyms
- Choristella philpotti Tillyard, 1917; Microchorista philgotti (Tillyard, 1917)

= Nannochorista philpotti =

Species of scorpionfly endemic to New Zealand

Nannochorista philpotti is a species of scorpionfly of the family Nannochoristidae. It is endemic to New Zealand. It was first described by Robert John Tillyard in 1917 and originally named Choristella philpotti in honour of Alfred Philpott.

== Description ==
This species was originally described as follows:

Head brown; eyes and antennae dark brown. Thorax blackish. Legs brown, with darker femora. Wings hyaline, the forewing marked all over with semi-transparent blotches of dull brownish, as shown in Text-fig. 3; hindwing slightly clouded with brown cat the points of union of the veins with the apical and posterior margins, and upon the cross-veins. Frenulum well-developed, with two strong bristles in the male, and a third somewhat shorter bristle also present in the female. Abdomen cylindrical, shiny black with pale pubescence. Segment 9 and anal appendages brown, the latter shaped very much as in Nannochorista maculipennis.

Male and female holotypes of this species are deposited at the New Zealand Arthropod Collection. Unusually, there are two holotype specimens. This is because in the original description the male and female were collected in two different locations and both designated as holotypes.

== Distribution ==
This species is endemic to New Zealand and is found on the South Island of New Zealand.

== Habitat ==
Borders of lakes and small mountain streams. Early life stages are aquatic, this includes larvae and pupa.

== Conservation status ==
The conservation status of this species under the New Zealand Threat Classification System - Wikipedia is Not Threatened as at 2018.
