= Mesogastropoda =

Historic group of snails

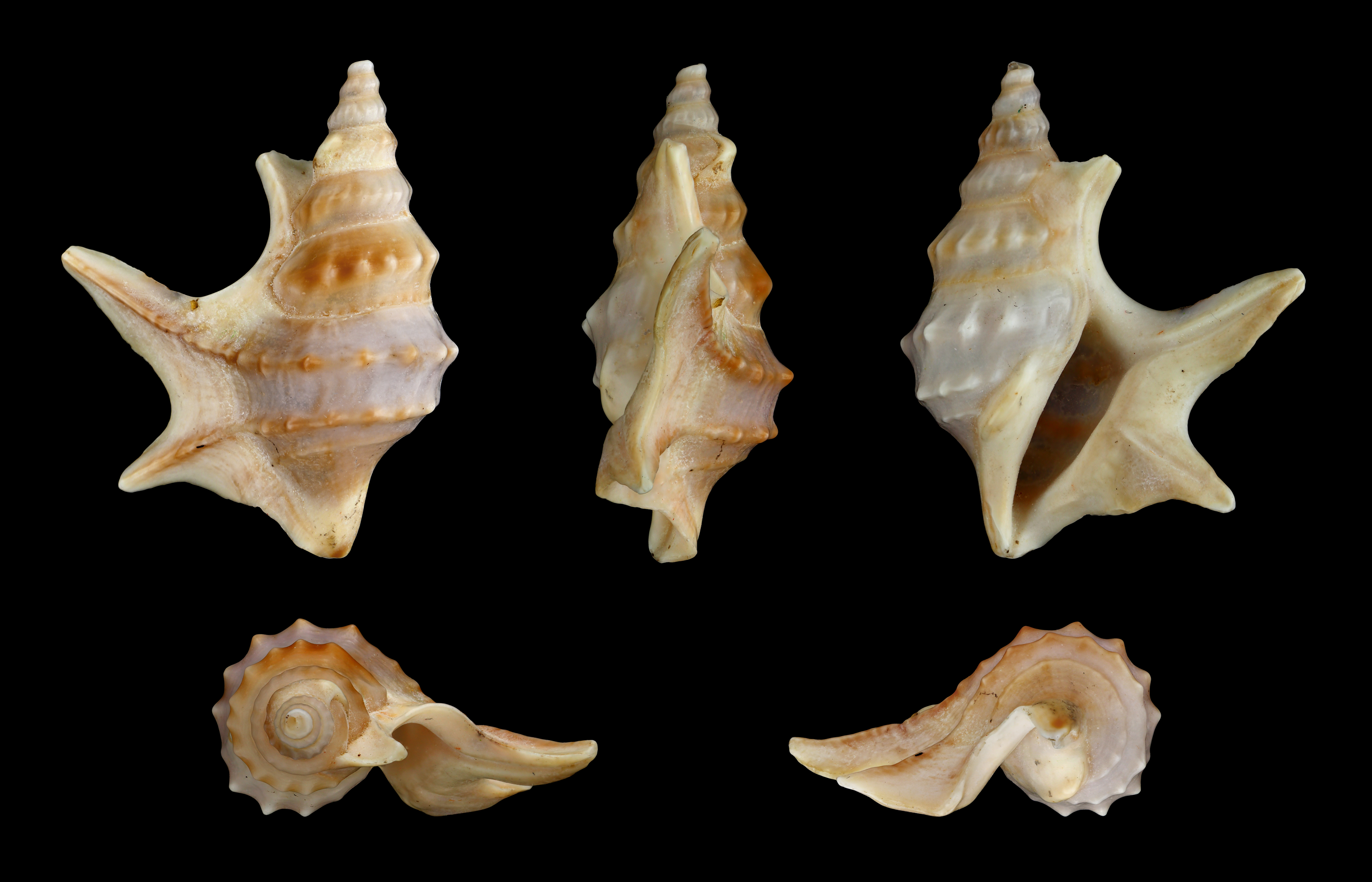
Aporrhais pespelecani

Mesogastropoda was for many years a traditional taxonomic group of snails, an order. The order was composed mostly of sea snails, but it also included some land snails and freshwater snails, all of which were prosobranch gastropod mollusks.

This order was introduced by J. Thiele in his work from 1921, it and was used for many decades subsequently.

Recent research in malacology however has made it clear that Mesogastropoda was not a monophyletic taxon, and because of that, the taxon is no longer included in modern classifications. Nonetheless, most of the standard texts and field guides on mollusks date from the time period when this classification was still current, and therefore references to mesogastropods or Mesogastropoda are frequently encountered.

The lower taxa that were traditionally contained in Mesogastropoda are now mostly placed in the superorder Caenogastropoda. A more detailed account of the taxonomy is given in the articles on Gastropoda and Archaeogastropoda, and a recent taxonomy is laid out in Taxonomy of the Gastropoda (Bouchet & Rocroi, 2005)

== Description ==
There are about 30,000 species that were included in this taxon. Most of them are to be found in the sea, but there are also numerous species in freshwater and even a few occur on land. Their shells have no mother-of-pearl or nacre.

Most of these snails are herbivorous, but a few are parasites or predators. The radula has seven denticles (or small teeth), which are sometimes reduced.

The Mesogastropoda are, in many ways, more developed than the Archaeogastropoda. Through torsion of the intestinal mass and a spiral movement of the body, the gill, the kidney and the osphradium (which means sensory receptor, or olfactory organ) have disappeared on the right side. These organs exist only on the left side of the animal.

The heart consists of only one atrium and one ventricle.

The nervous system is also more developed than in the Archeogastropods. The ganglia are connected with different organs through nerve pathways.

In the Mesogastropoda, the excretory and the reproductive ducts are separated (in contrast with the most primitive prosobranchs). Many members produce egg capsules, containing one to more than 1,000 eggs.

== Taxonomy ==
Here follows the taxonomy of the Mesogastropoda (according to the ITIS) (which is no longer considered valid).

The next taxonomy that was used was that of to Ponder & Lindberg, 1997.

The current prevailing system of taxonomy is that of Bouchet & Rocroi, 2005.

== Families ==
- Abyssochrysidae
- Aciculidae
- Aporrhaidae Mörch, 1852
- Asterophilidae
- Chondropomidae
- Choristeidae (the original name Choristidae was a name to be emended to Choristeidae by the ICZN to remove homonymy with Choristidae, a family of scorpionflies)
- Cingulopsidae
- Cochlostomatidae
- Diastomidae Cossman, 1895
- Fossaridae Trachel, 1861
- Hydrococcidae
- Iravadiidae
- Lacunidae Gill, 1871
- Littorinidae Gray, 1840
- Melanopsidae
- Micromelaniidae
- Omalaxidae
- Paedophoropodidae
- Pilidae
- Pomatiopsidae
- Pseudosacculidae
- Stenothyridae
- Stiliferidae
- Struthiolariidae
- Syrnolopsidae
- Trachysmidae
- Trochaclisidae
- Superfamily Cyclophoroidea
- Superfamily Viviparoidea
