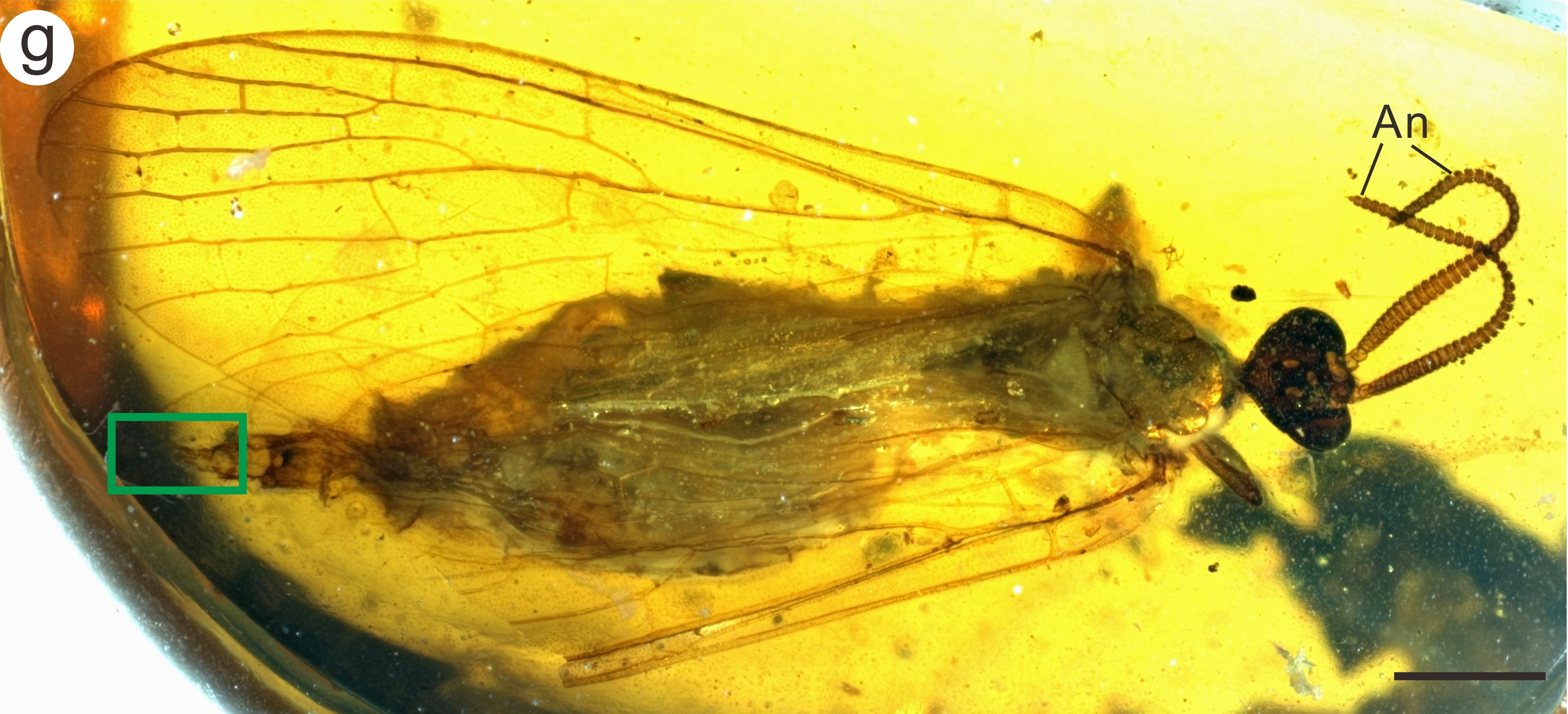
- Burmopsyche bella in dorsal view

Scientific classification
- Kingdom: Animalia
- Phylum: Arthropoda
- Clade: Pancrustacea
- Class: Insecta
- Order: Mecoptera
- Superfamily: †Mesopsychoidea
- Family: †Aneuretopsychidae; Rasnitsyn and Kozlov 1990

Genera
- †Aneuretopsyche; †Burmopsyche; †Jeholopsyche

= Aneuretopsychidae =

Aneuretopsychidae Temporal range: Oxfordian–Cenomanian

Extinct family of insects

Aneuretopsychidae is an extinct family of scorpionflies known from the Mesozoic. Fossils are known from the Jurassic (Callovian-Oxfordian) to the early Late Cretaceous (Cenomanian). It is part of Mesopsychoidea, a group of scorpionflies with siphonate proboscis. They are suggested to have been nectarivores, feeding off the liquid pollination drops of and acting as pollinators for now extinct insect pollinated gymnosperms such as Bennettitales.

== Systematics ==
Diagnostic characters include the "presence of pseudo-loop in the anal area of the forewing, and the well-developed jugum of the hind wing" It has been proposed that the family are the sister group to fleas, however a detailed analysis of the mouthparts of well preserved amber specimens found that they were homologous to those found in the Pseudopolycentropodidae and dissimilar to those of fleas.

- Aneuretopsyche Rasnitsyn and Kozlov 1990
  - A. minima Rasnitsyn and Kozlov 1990 Karabastau Formation, Kazakhstan, Callovian/Oxfordian
  - A. rostrata Rasnitsyn and Kozlov 1990 Karabastau Formation, Kazakhstan, Callovian/Oxfordian
  - A. vitimensis Rasnitsyn and Kozlov 1990 Zaza Formation, Russia, Aptian
- Burmopsyche Zhao et al. 2020
  - B. bella Zhao et al. 2020 Burmese amber, Myanmar, Cenomanian
  - B. xiai Zhao et al. 2020 Burmese amber, Myanmar, Cenomanian
- Jeholopsyche Ren, Shih and Labandeira, 2009, 2011
  - J. bella Qiao et al. 2012 Yixian Formation, China, Aptian
  - J. completa Qiao et al. 2012 Yixian Formation, China, Aptian
  - J. liaoningensis Ren, Shih and Labandeira, 2009, 2011 Yixian Formation, China, Aptian
  - J. maxima Qiao et al. 2012 Yixian Formation, China, Aptian

== Gallery ==
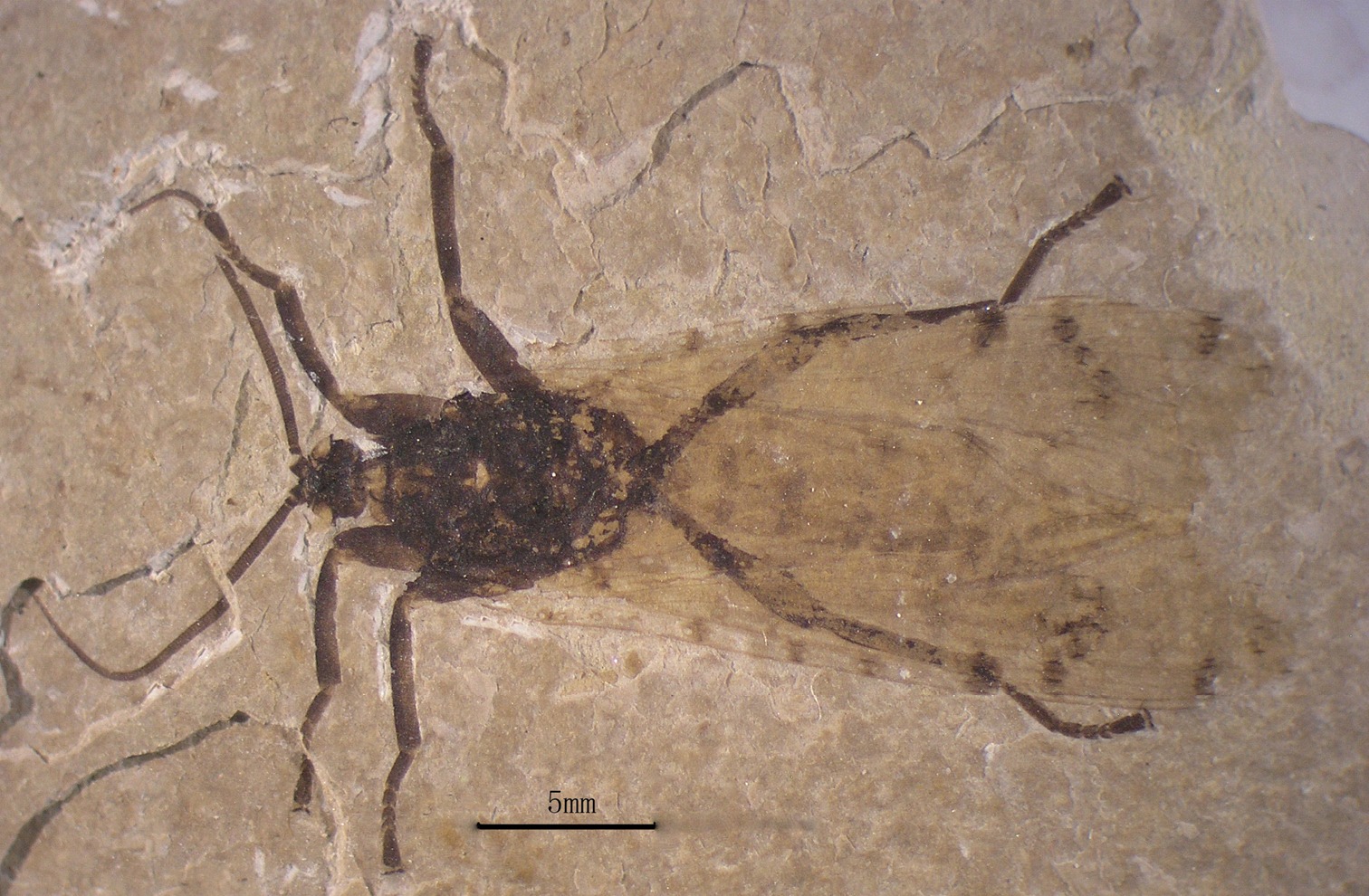
Jeholopsyche liaoningensis dorsal

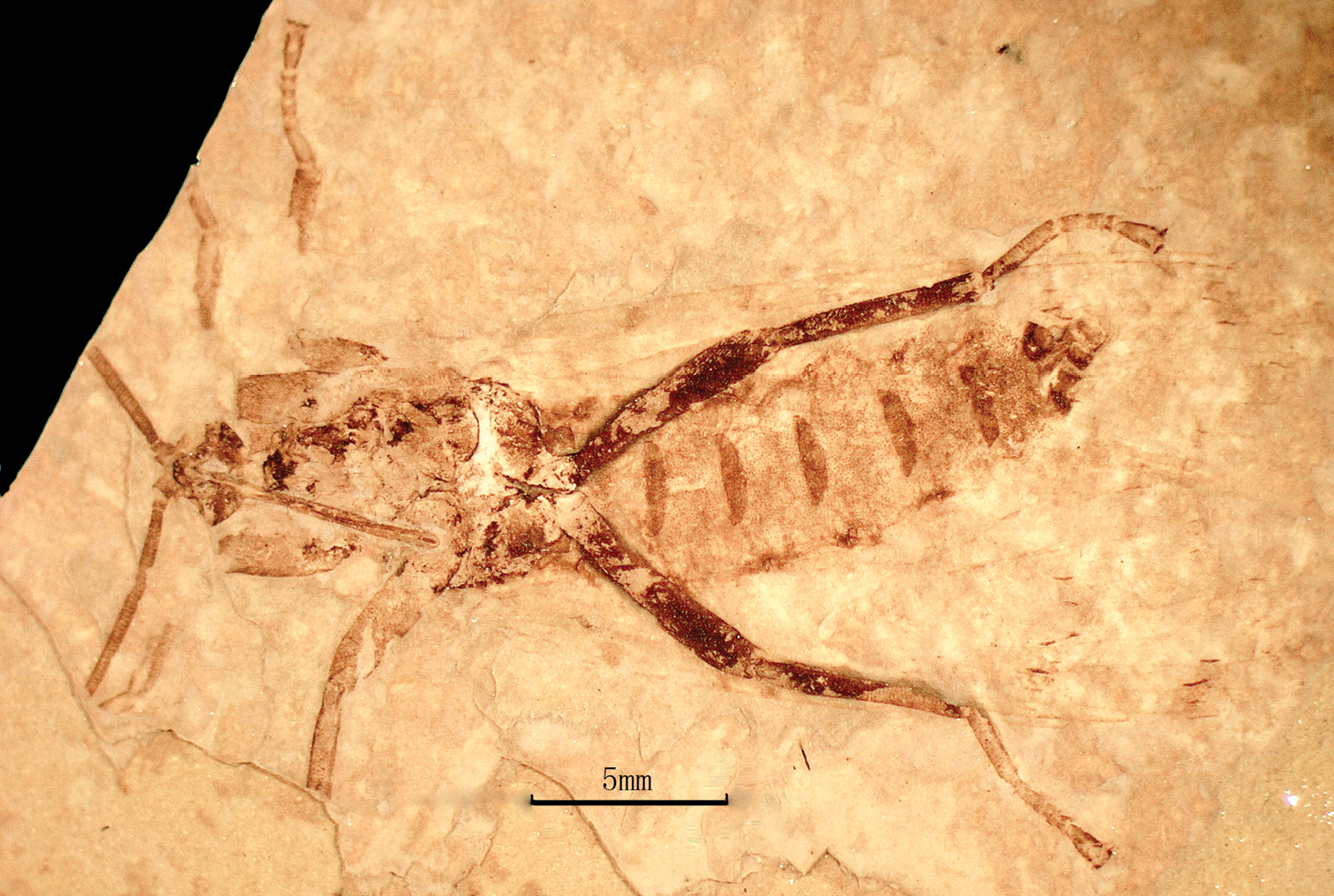
Jeholopsyche liaoningensis ventral, showing proboscis
