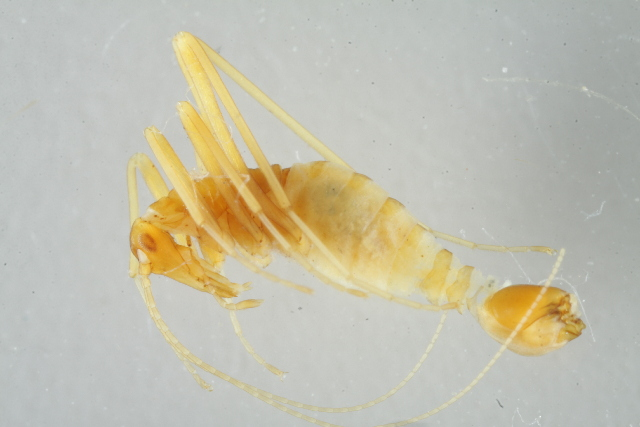

Scientific classification
- Domain: Eukaryota
- Kingdom: Animalia
- Phylum: Arthropoda
- Class: Insecta
- Order: Mecoptera
- Family: Apteropanorpidae
- Genus: Apteropanorpa
- Species: A. tasmanica

Binomial name
- Apteropanorpa tasmanica Carpenter, 1941

= Apteropanorpa tasmanica =

Species of insect

Apteropanorpa tasmanica, is a species of wingless scorpionfly native to Tasmania. As with other Apteropanorpa species the adults are thought to feed on dead and dying invertebrates. The larvae are not known with certainty, though probable larvae have been recorded from moss.

Apteropanorpa tasmanica is known to carry two species of parasitic mites, Leptus agrotis and Willungella rufosanus.
