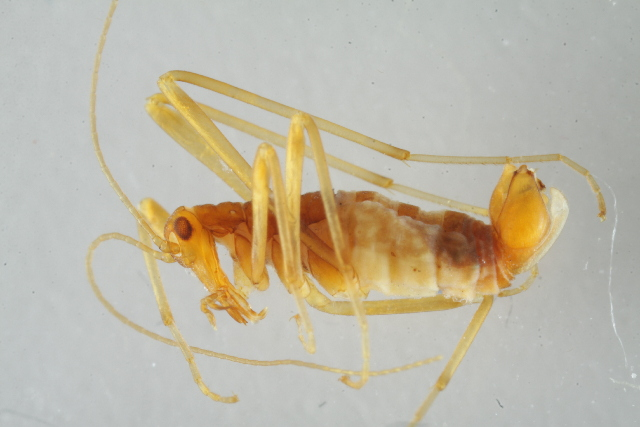
- Specimen of Apteropanorpa tasmanica

Scientific classification
- Kingdom: Animalia
- Phylum: Arthropoda
- Clade: Pancrustacea
- Class: Insecta
- Order: Mecoptera
- Family: Apteropanorpidae; Byers, 1965
- Genus: Apteropanorpa; Carpenter, 1941

Species
- Apteropanorpa evansi Apteropanorpa hartzi Apteropanorpa tasmanica Apteropanorpa warra

= Apteropanorpidae =

Family of flies

Apteropanorpidae is a family of wingless scorpionflies containing a single genus, Apteropanorpa, with four named species, which are all endemic to the Australian island of Tasmania. Of the four known species, three occupy alpine habitats while A. warra occupies lower elevations.

Mature individuals inhabit vegetation. Adults are scavengers, feeding on dead and occasionally dying invertebrates, inserting their mouthparts into pre-existing holes in the body cavity to consume internal soft parts, very occasionally consuming the entire exoskeleton if present. Adults are startled and will run away at any sign of movement from prey. The larvae are not known with certainty, though probable larvae have been recorded from moss.

The best-known species, Apteropanorpa tasmanica, is known to carry two species of parasitic mites.

== Etymology ==
The genus name is derived from Panorpidae, a related family, and Ancient Greek apteros "wingless".

== See also ==
- Snow scorpionfly (Boreidae), another family of scorpionflies with reduced or no wings
