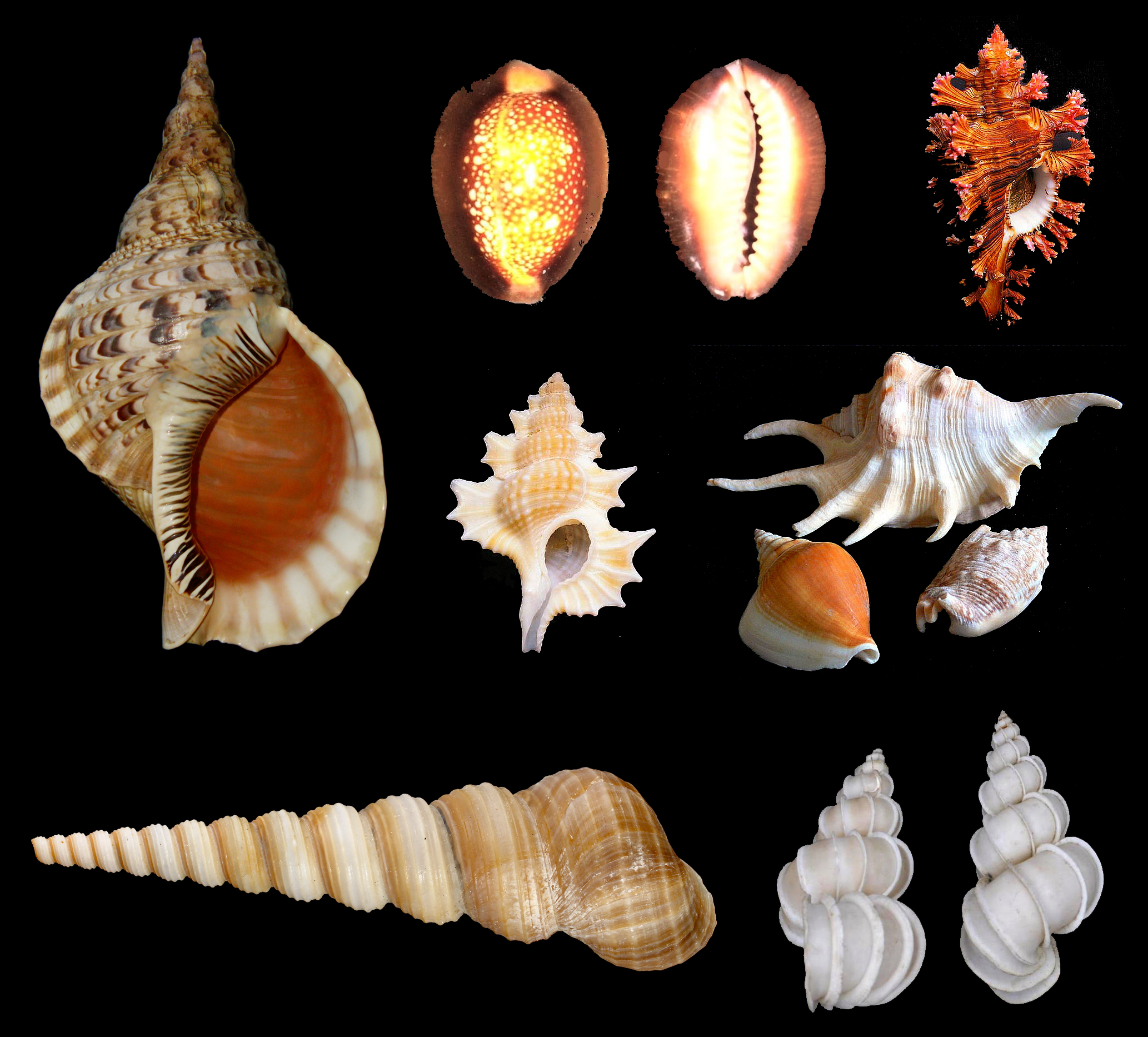
- Various examples of Caenogastropoda

Scientific classification
- Kingdom: Animalia
- Phylum: Mollusca
- Class: Gastropoda
- Subclass: Caenogastropoda; Cox, 1960

= Caenogastropoda =

Caenogastropoda Temporal range: Carboniferous – Recent

Clade of sea snails

Caenogastropoda is a taxonomic subclass of molluscs in the class Gastropoda. It is a large diverse group which are mostly sea snails and other marine gastropod mollusks, but also includes some freshwater snails and some land snails. The subclass is the most diverse and ecologically successful of the gastropods.

Caenogastropoda contains many families of shelled marine molluscs – including the periwinkles, cowries, wentletraps, moon snails, murexes, cone snails and turrids – and constitutes about 60% of all living gastropods.

== Biology ==
The Caenogastropoda exhibit torsion, and thus are included in what was previously called the Streptoneura (meaning twisted nerves), also known as Prosobranchia (meaning gills forward). Specifically, they are characterized by having only a single auricle in the heart and a single pair of gill leaflets, and are equivalent to the Monotocardia or Pectinibranchia of older authors.

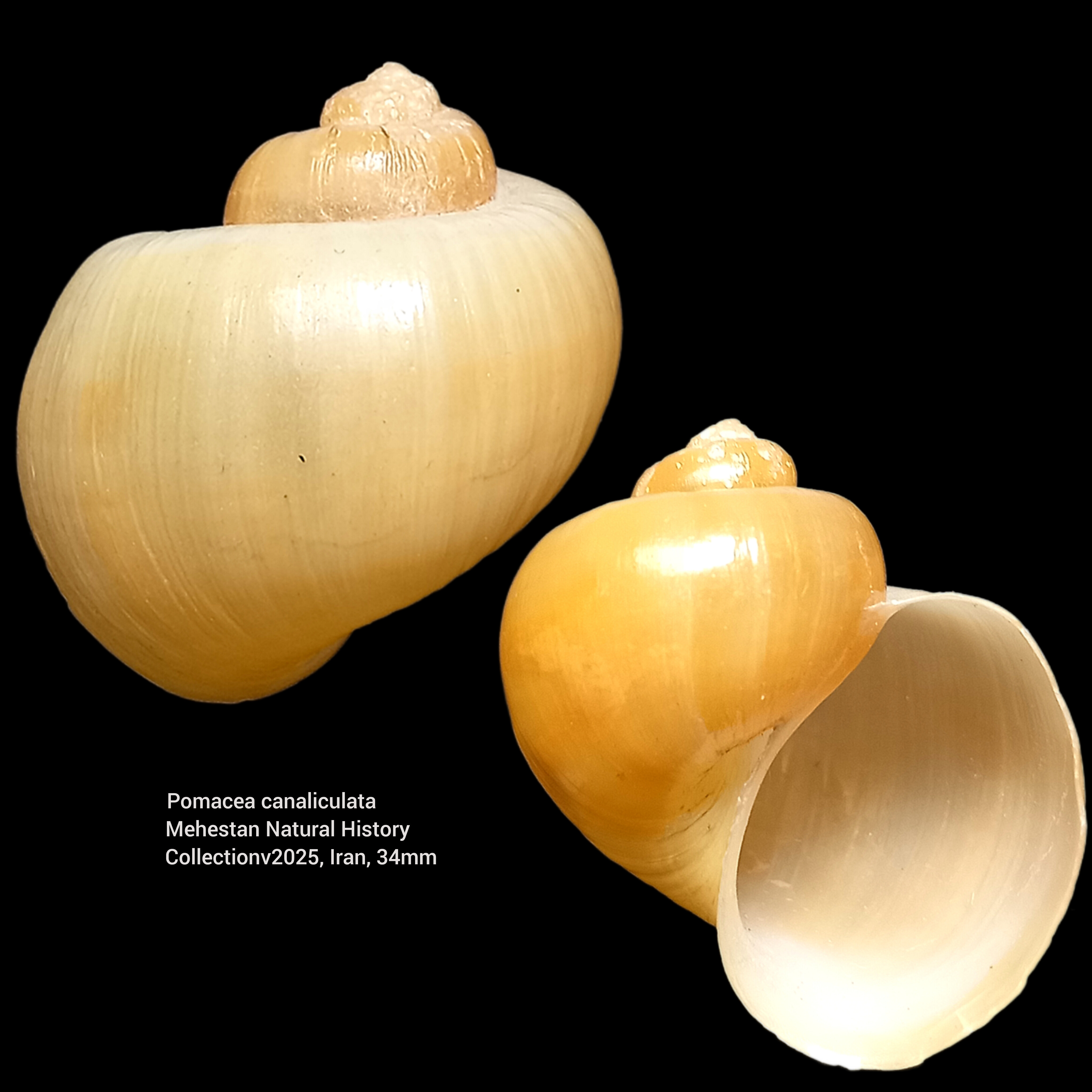
Pomacea canaliculata

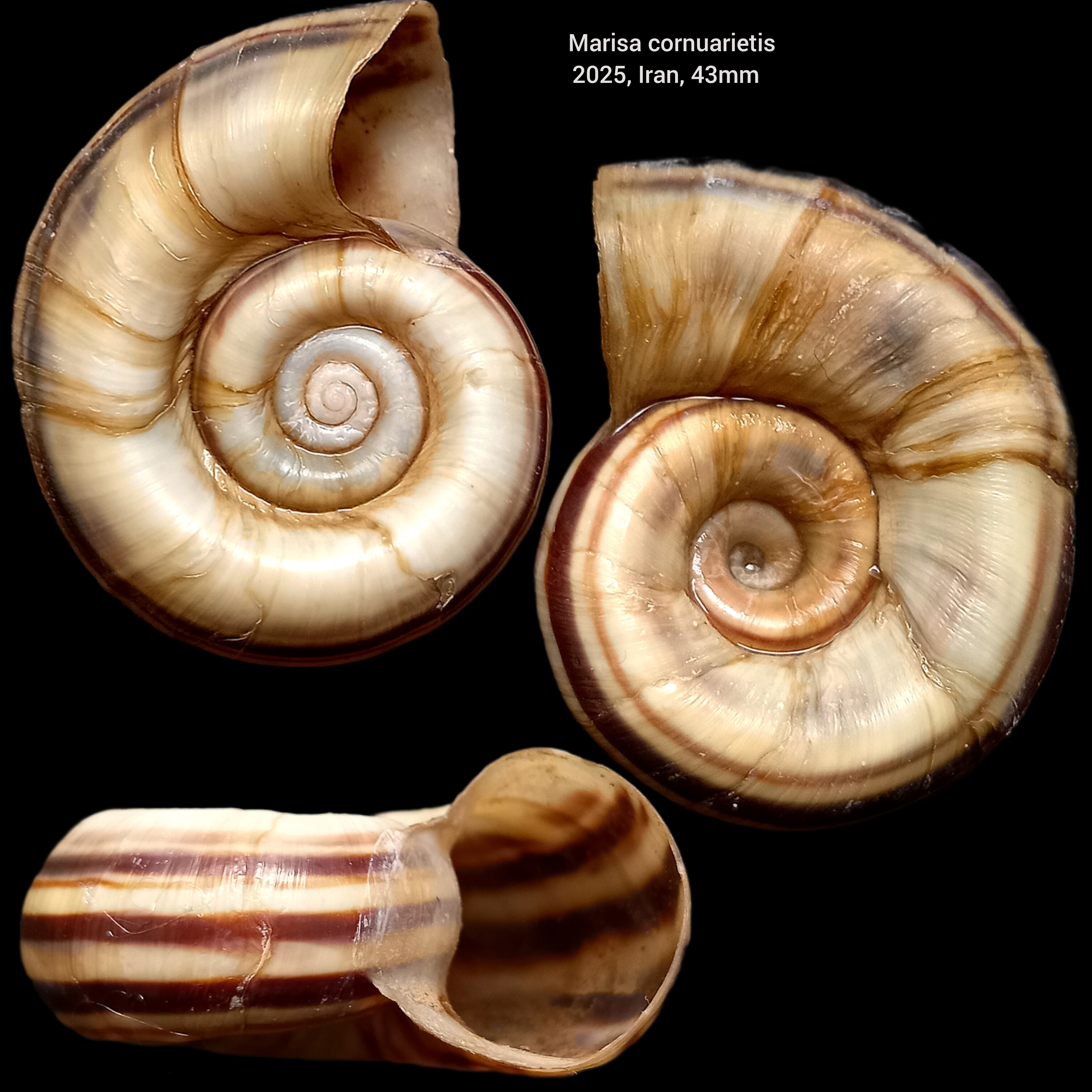
Marisa cornuarietis

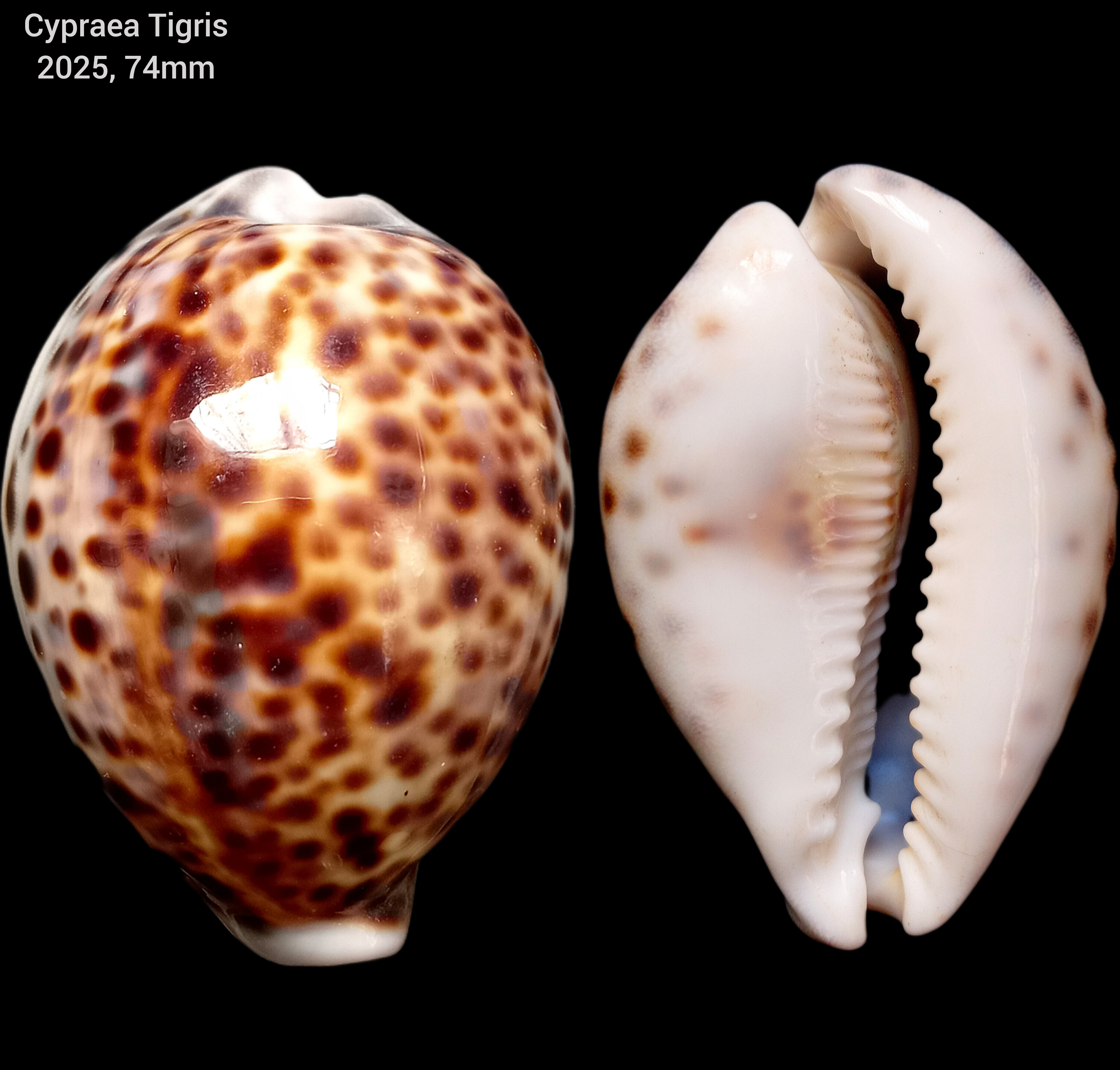
Cypraea tigris

== Taxonomy ==
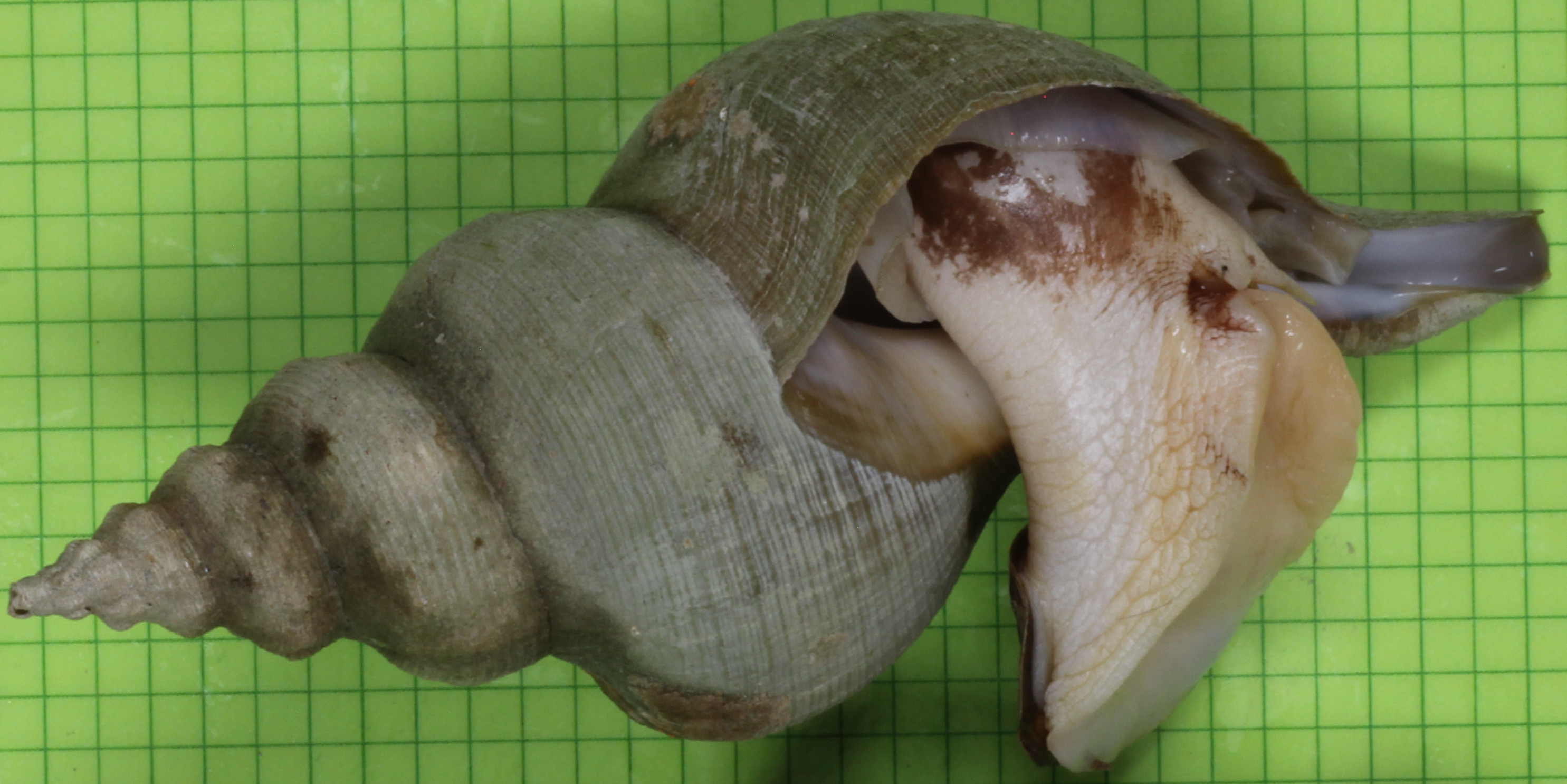
A siphon whelk Penion cuvierianus jeakingsi.

The taxon Caenogastropoda was first established by Leslie Reginald Cox in 1960 as a superorder but now sometimes it is retained as a clade. Based on optimal phylogenetic analysis, it is deemed monophyletic. This Caenogastropoda combines the older taxa Mesogastropoda and Stenoglossa from the classification by Johannes Thiele and is equivalent to the revised Monotocardia as defined by Mörch in 1865.

Caenogastropoda can be divided into two major groups, based on the anatomy of the radula:

- Taenioglossa (from taenio meaning band), equivalent to the older Mesogastropoda, with typically seven teeth in each radular row.
- Stenoglossa (from steno meaning narrow), the Neogastropoda, with only 1–3 teeth per row.

=== 1997 taxonomy ===
Ponder & Lindberg, 1997 and others since (e.g. Vega et al., 2006; Harzhauser, 2004; and Pina, 2002.) show Caenogastropoda as a superorder, following the sense of Cox, 1960. More recently Bouchet & Rocroi, 2005 revised Caenogastropoda as a clade.

=== 2005 taxonomy ===
The following classification was laid out in the taxonomy of Bouchet & Rocroi (2005):

- Caenogastropoda of uncertain systematic position
- an informal group Architaenioglossa
- clade Sorbeoconcha
- clade Hypsogastropoda

=== 2006 taxonomy ===
Colgan et al. (2006) provided further insight into the phylogeny of Caenogastropoda.

=== Latest views by the World Register of Marine Species ===
Sorbeoconcha should include [Cerithioidea + Campaniloidea + all Hypsogastropoda (i.e. the remaining Caenogastropoda)], see definition in Ponder & Lindberg, 1997: 225, not only [Cerithioidea + Campaniloidea] as suggested by the indent pattern in Bouchet & Rocroi. Neotaenioglossa Haller, 1892 suggested in Ruud Bank's draft for Fauna Europaea is not retained because it would need severe emendation to remove Pyramidellids, Cerithioids, etc. included in its original definition, and therefore would be too far from Haller's concept if it were to fit the concept of Sorbeoconcha. Although cladistically sound, the taxon Sorbeoconcha is skipped in the classification scheme because (1) ten years after its publication, the name still sounds unfamiliar to most and (2) it is not very helpful in the classification because it includes the bulk of Caenogastropoda (only keeping out small stem groups Abyssochrysidae, Provannidae, and the architaenioglossate taxa). This is not final, opinions are welcome.

Taxonomy as provided by WoRMS in 2021

- Subterclass Sorbeoconcha
- Superorder Hypsogastropoda
- Order Architaenioglossa
- Order Littorinimorpha
- Order Neogastropoda
- Order [unassigned] Caenogastropoda (temporary name)
- Order Stenoglossa has become a synonym of Neogastropoda
