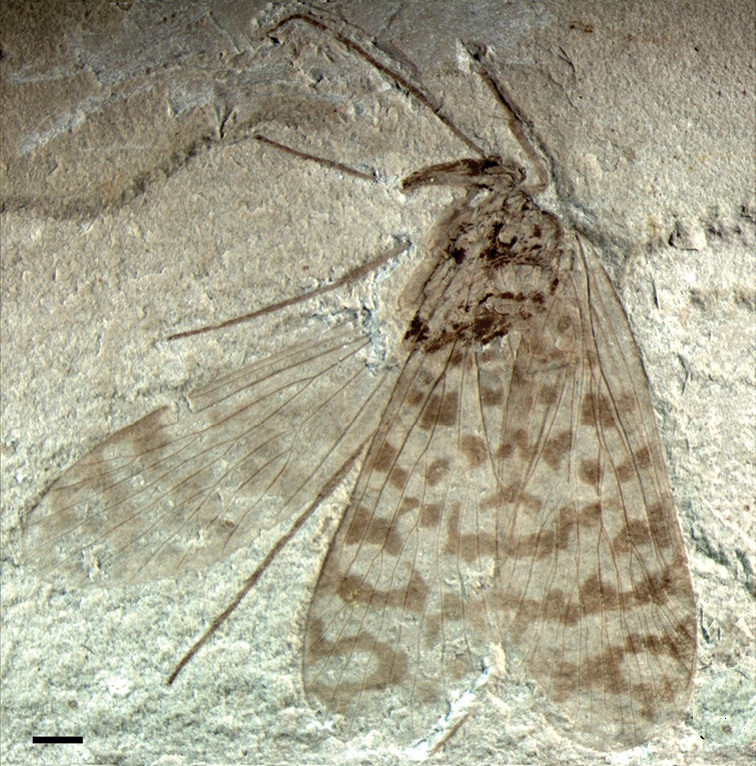
- Jurassipanorpa sticta holotype

Scientific classification
- Kingdom: Animalia
- Phylum: Arthropoda
- Class: Insecta
- Order: Mecoptera
- Family: Panorpidae
- Genus: †Jurassipanorpa; Ding, Shih & Ren, 2014

Type species
- Jurassipanorpa impunctata Ding, Shih & Ren, 2014

Species
- J. impunctata J. sticta

= Jurassipanorpa =

Jurassipanorpa Temporal range: Middle Jurassic

Extinct genus of scorpionflies

Jurassipanorpa is a genus of fossil scorpionfly (order Mecoptera) containing two species described in 2014 from the Jiulongshan Formation of Inner Mongolia, China. The two species, J. impuctata and J. sticta, lived in the late Middle Jurassic period. Upon description, they were claimed to represent the oldest known representatives of the scorpionfly family Panorpidae, but this was later questioned.

== Description ==
Jurassipanorpa specimens measure up to 11 millimeters in body length, with wings reaching a maximum length of 14 mm.

Both species have unique setae ("hairs") on the anal veins of the hindwings that are larger and more prominent than the fine setae found in all other panorpid scorpionflies.

J. sticta differs from J. impuctata by the presence of spots and blotches on the wings: sticta derives from the Greek stiktos meaning spotted, while impunctata means "without spots" in Latin.

== Discovery ==
Jurassipanorpa was described from four specimens discovered in the Jiulongshan Formation at Daohugou Village in Ningcheng County, Inner Mongolia, by researchers from the Capital Normal University and the Russian Academy of Sciences in 2014. Other scorpionfles from the Jiulongshan Formation include Miriholcorpa and Fortiholcorpa, which have yet to be formally placed in a taxonomic family.
