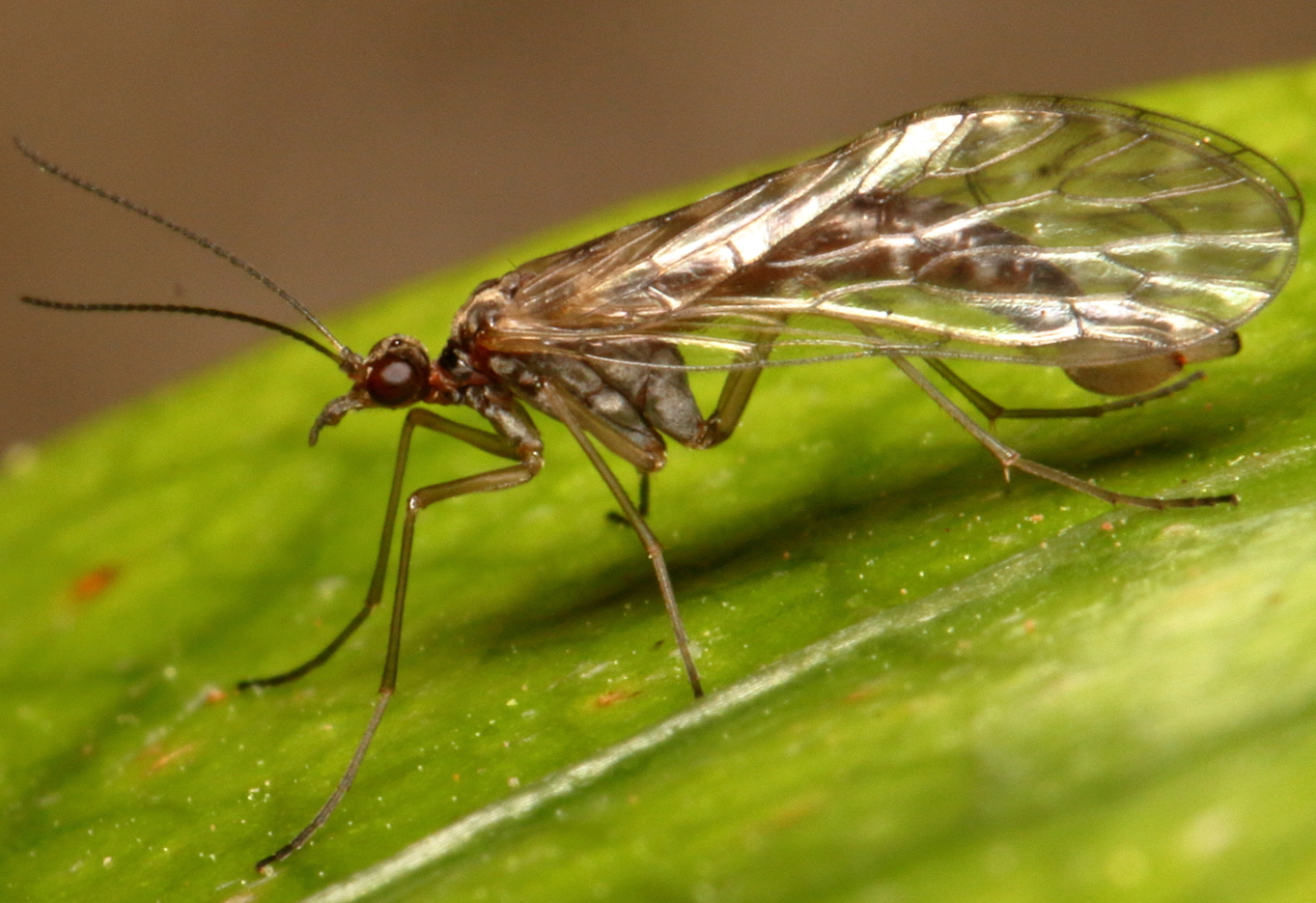
- Nannochorista philpotti

Scientific classification
- Kingdom: Animalia
- Phylum: Arthropoda
- Clade: Pancrustacea
- Class: Insecta
- Order: Mecoptera
- Family: Nannochoristidae; Tillyard, 1917

Genera
- See text

= Nannochoristidae =

Nannochoristidae Temporal range: Middle Jurassic–Recent

Family of insects

Nannochoristidae is an unusual family of scorpionflies. It is a tiny, relict family with a single extant genus, Nannochorista, with eight species occurring in New Zealand, southeastern Australia, Tasmania, Argentina and Chile. Some studies have placed them as the closest living relatives of fleas. Most mecopteran larvae are eruciform, or shaped like caterpillars, however Nannochoristid larvae are elateriform, and have elongated and slender bodies. The larvae are aquatic, which is unique among mecopterans. The larvae are predatory, hunting on the beds of shallow streams, primarily on the larvae of aquatic Diptera like chironomids. The adults are thought probably to be adapted to liquid feeding, likely on flower nectar and/or the juice of fruits. Adults of Australian and South American species are often found in habitats like the edges of streams, lakes, as well as montane bogs. Australian species have been observed visiting the foliage and flowers of Leptospermum (tea trees).

Due to the group's distinctiveness from other scorpionflies, it is sometimes placed in its own order, the Nannomecoptera. Fossils indicate that Nannochoristidae formerly had a wider distribution, being present in the Northern Hemisphere during the Jurassic and Early Cretaceous.

Some research suggests the nannochoristids are the only holometabolous insects with true larval compound eyes. All other eyed larvae have stemmata, which are structurally different from adult compound eyes with ommatidia. This is unusual, since most adult features are present as imaginal discs in larvae and not formed until pupation. The presence of compound eyes in nannochoristid larvae suggests the timing of the development of adult features can be initiated earlier in development, which has important implications for insect evolutionary development.

== Phylogeny ==
The cladogram of external relationships, based on a 2008 DNA and protein analysis, shows the family as a clade, sister to the Siphonaptera (fleas) and rest of Mecoptera, and more distantly related to the Diptera (true flies) and Mecoptera (scorpionflies).

- Antliophora
  - Diptera (true flies)
  - Mecoptera
    - Nannochoristidae
    - - Pistillifera (scorpionflies, hangingflies)
      - - Boreidae (snow scorpionflies)
        - Siphonaptera (fleas)

A more recent study in 2020 found Nannochoristidae to be the sister group to fleas, with strong support.

- Antliophora
  - Diptera (true flies)
  - - Boreidae (snow scorpionflies, 30 spp.)
    - - - Nannochoristidae (southern scorpionflies, 8 spp.)
        - Siphonaptera (fleas, 2500 spp.)
      - Pistillifera (scorpionflies, hangingflies, 400 spp.)

== Genera ==
After Cao et al. 2022.

- Nannochorista Tillyard, 1917 (8 species: Argentina, Chile, Tasmania, Australia, New Zealand) Koonwarra Fossil Bed, Australia, Early Cretaceous (Aptian)
- †Dahurochorista Sukatsheva 1985 (one species: Ichetuy Formation, Russia, Late Jurassic (Oxfordian)
- †Dahurolarva Sukatsheva 1985 (one species: Ichetuy Formation, Oxfordian, Russia) (based on larvae only)
- †Itaphlebia Sukatsheva 1985 (14 species) Itat Formation, Russia, Middle Jurassic (Bathonian), Daohugou, China, Middle Jurassic (Callovian), Karabastau Formation, Kazakhstan, Late Jurassic (Oxfordian) Doronino Formation, Russia, Early Cretaceous (Barremian)
- †Namdyrus Sukacheva 1993 Khaya Formation, Russia, Late Jurassic (Tithonian)
- †Tarantogus Sukatsheva, 1985 Itat Formation, Russia, Bathonian (based on larvae only)
- †Undisca Sukatsheva, 1990 Glushkovo Formation, Russia, Tithonian
