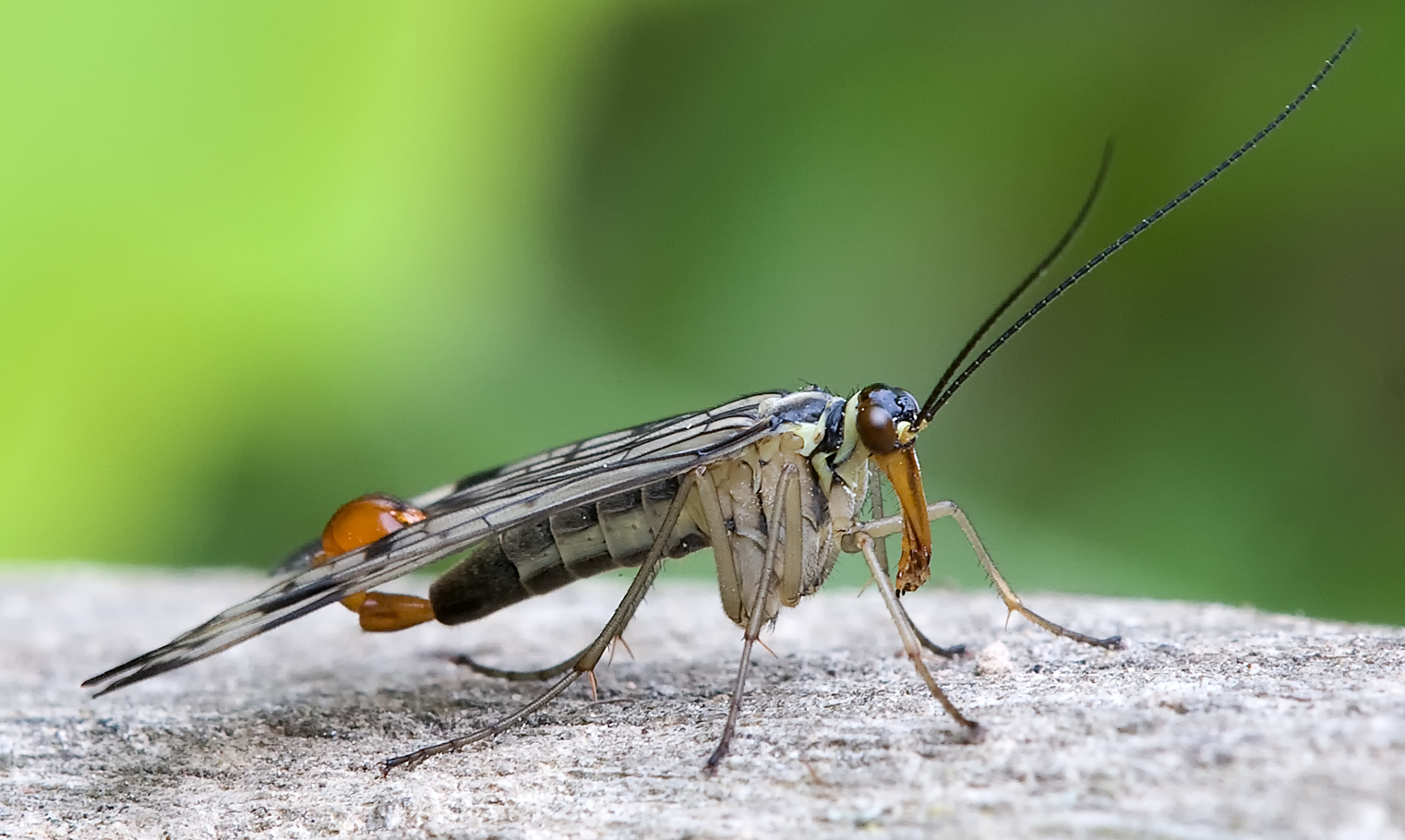
- Panorpa communis, male

Scientific classification
- Kingdom: Animalia
- Phylum: Arthropoda
- Clade: Pancrustacea
- Class: Insecta
- Clade: Antliophora
- Order: Mecoptera; Packard, 1886; Comstock, 1895

Families
- Apteropanorpidae; Boreidae (snow scorpionflies); Choristidae; †Choristopsychidae; †Englathaumatidae; Eomeropidae; Meropeidae (earwigflies); †Permochoristidae; †Mesopsychoidea (=Aneuretopsychina); †Aneuretopsychidae; †Mesopsychidae; †Nedubroviidae; †Pseudopolycentropodidae; Nannochoristidae; Siphonaptera? (fleas); Pistillifera; Panorpoidea; †Australochoristidae; †Austropanorpidae; †Cantabridae; †Dinopanorpidae; †Eorpidae; †Holcorpidae; †Orthophlebiidae; Panorpidae (common scorpionflies); Panorpodidae (short-faced scorpionflies); †Protorthophlebiidae; †Worcestobiidae; Raptipedia; Bittacidae (hangingflies); †Cimbrophlebiidae

= Mecoptera =

Mecoptera Temporal range: Early Permian - Recent

Order of insects

Mecoptera (from Ancient Greek μῆκος (mêkos), meaning 'length', and πτερόν (pterón), meaning 'wing') is an order of insects in the superorder Holometabola with about six hundred species in nine families worldwide. Mecopterans are sometimes called scorpionflies after their largest family, Panorpidae, in which the males have enlarged genitals raised over the body that look similar to the stingers of scorpions, and long beaklike rostra. The Bittacidae, or hangingflies, are another prominent family and are known for their elaborate mating rituals, in which females choose mates based on the quality of gift prey offered to them by the males. A smaller group is the snow scorpionflies, family Boreidae, adults of which are sometimes seen walking on snowfields. In contrast, the majority of species in the order inhabit moist environments in tropical locations.

The Mecoptera are closely related to the Siphonaptera (fleas), with some studies suggesting that the fleas are a derived group of parasitic mecopterans, and a little more distantly related to the Diptera (true flies). They are somewhat fly-like in appearance, being small to medium-sized insects with long slender bodies and narrow membranous wings. Most breed in moist environments such as leaf litter or moss, and the eggs may not hatch until the wet season arrives. The larvae are caterpillar-like and mostly feed on vegetable matter, and the non-feeding pupae may pass through a diapause until weather conditions are favorable.

Early Mecoptera may have played an important role in pollinating extinct species of gymnosperms before the evolution of other insect pollinators such as bees. Adults of modern species are overwhelmingly predators or consumers of dead organisms. In a few areas, some species are the first insects to arrive at a cadaver, making them useful in forensic entomology.

== Diversity ==
Mecopterans vary in length from 2 to 35 mm (0.1 to 1.4 in). There are about six hundred extant species known, divided into thirty-four genera in nine families. The majority of the species are contained in the families Panorpidae and Bittacidae. Besides this there are about four hundred known fossil species in about eighty-seven genera, which are more diverse than the living members of the order.

Distribution of mecopterans is worldwide; the greatest diversity at the species level is in the Afrotropic and Palearctic realms, but there is greater diversity at the generic and family level in the Neotropic, Nearctic and Australasian realms. They are absent from Madagascar and many islands and island groups; this may demonstrate that their dispersal ability is low. The islands where they are found, such as Trinidad, Taiwan and Japan, have had recent land bridges to the nearest continental land masses.

== Evolution and phylogeny ==
=== Taxonomic history ===
The European scorpionfly was named Panorpa communis by Linnaeus in 1758. The Mecoptera were named by Alpheus Hyatt and Jennie Maria Arms in 1891. The name is from the Greek, mecos meaning long, and ptera meaning wings. The families of Mecoptera are well accepted by taxonomists but their relationships have been debated. In 1987, R. Willman treated the Mecoptera as a clade, containing the Boreidae as sister to the Meropeidae, but in 2002 Michael F. Whiting declared the Mecoptera so-defined as paraphyletic, with the Boreidae as sister to another order, the Siphonaptera (fleas).

=== Fossil history ===
Among the earliest members of the Mecoptera are the Nannochoristidae of Upper Permian age. Fossil Mecoptera become abundant and diverse during the Cretaceous, for example in China, where panorpids such as Jurassipanorpa, Bittacidae, Orthophlebiidae, and Cimbrophlebiidae have been found.

Extinct Mecoptera species may have been important pollinators of early gymnosperm seed plants during the late Middle Jurassic to mid–Early Cretaceous periods before other pollinating groups such as the bees evolved. These were mainly wind-pollinated plants, but fossil mecopterans had siphon-feeding apparatus that could have fertilized these early gymnosperms by feeding on their nectar and pollen. The lack of iron enrichment in their fossilized probosces rules out their use for drinking blood.

Eleven species have been identified from three families, Mesopsychidae, Aneuretopsychidae, and Pseudopolycentropodidae within the clade Aneuretopsychina. Their lengths range from 3 mm (0.12 in) in Parapolycentropus burmiticus to 28 mm (1.1 in) in Lichnomesopsyche gloriae. The proboscis could be as long as 10 mm (0.39 in). It has been suggested that these mecopterans transferred pollen on their mouthparts and head surfaces, as do bee flies and hoverflies today, but no such associated pollen has been found, even when the insects were finely preserved in Eocene Baltic amber. They likely pollinated plants such as Caytoniaceae, Cheirolepidiaceae, and Gnetales, which have ovulate organs that are either poorly suited for wind pollination or have structures that could support long-proboscid fluid feeding. The Aneuretopsychina were the most diverse group of mecopterans in the Latest Permian, taking the place of the Permochoristidae, to the Middle Triassic. During the Late Triassic through the Middle Jurassic, Aneuretopsychina species were gradually replaced by species from the Parachoristidae and Orthophlebiidae. Modern mecopteran families are derived from the Orthophlebiidae.

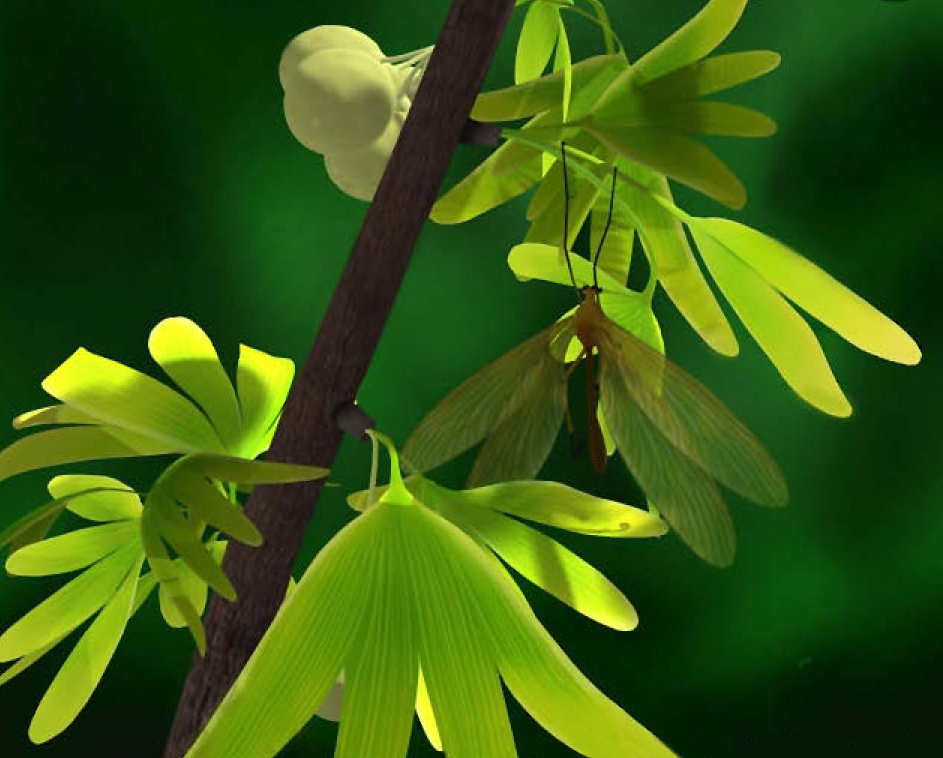
Juracimbrophlebia ginkgofolia (Cimbrophlebiidae) reconstruction, Jurassic; China

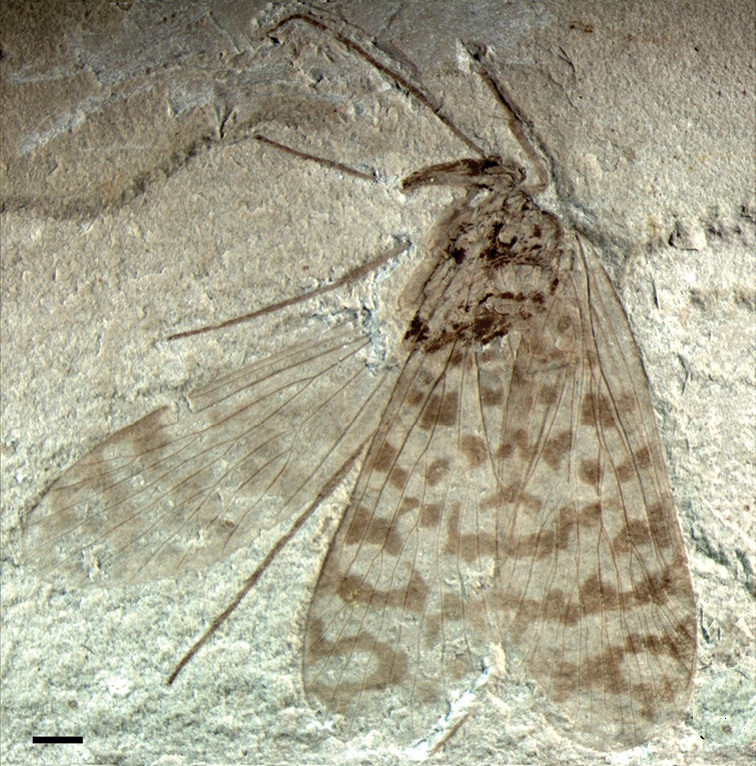
Jurassipanorpa sticta (Panorpidae), Jurassic; China

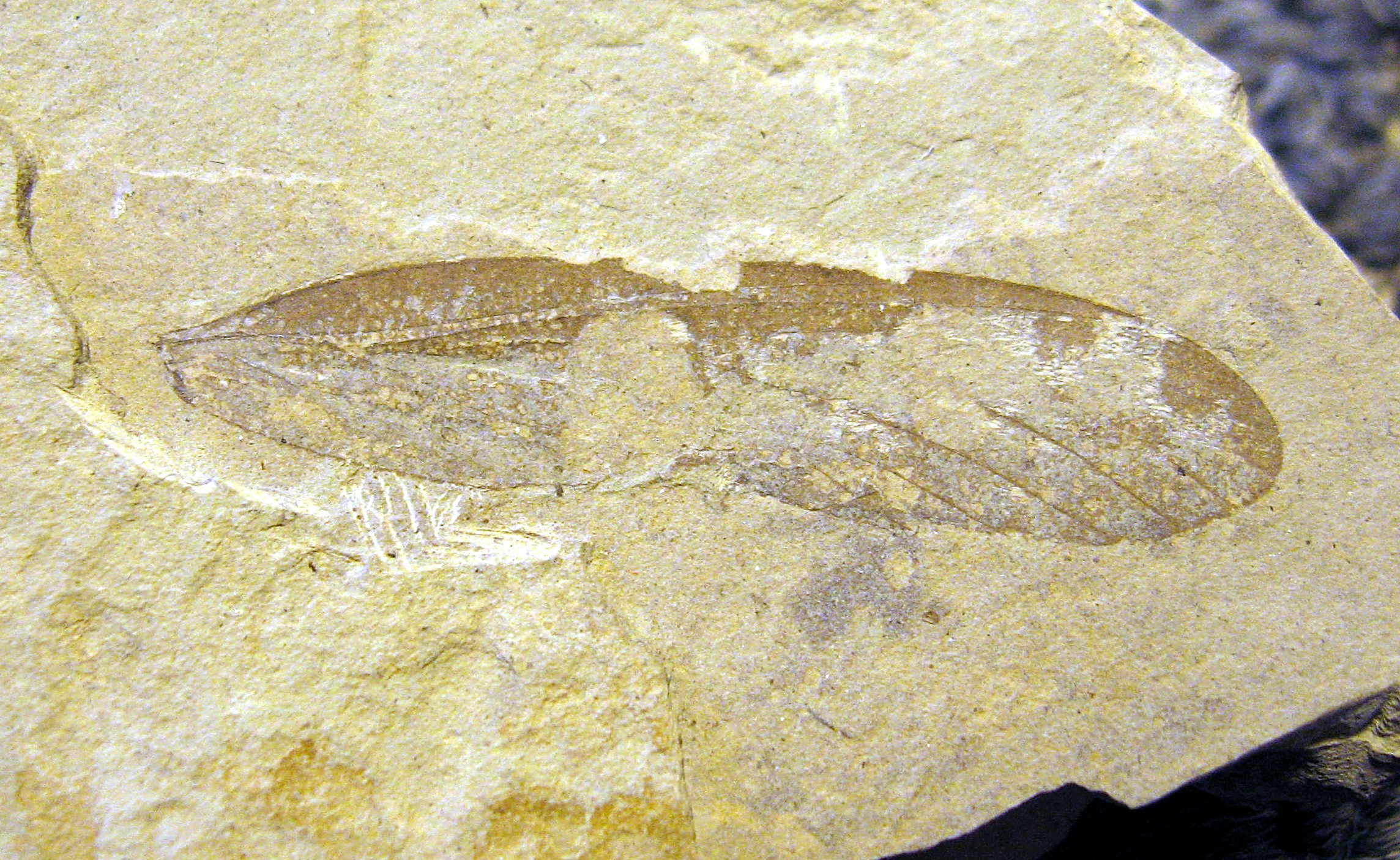
Forewing of Dinokanaga andersoni (Dinopanorpidae), Eocene; Washington state

=== External relationships ===
Mecoptera have special importance in the evolution of the insects. Two of the most important insect orders, Lepidoptera (butterflies and moths) and Diptera (true flies), along with Trichoptera (caddisflies), probably evolved from ancestors belonging to, or strictly related to, the Mecoptera. Evidence includes anatomical and biochemical similarities as well as transitional fossils, such as Permotanyderus and Choristotanyderus, which lie between the Mecoptera and Diptera. The group was once much more widespread and diverse than it is now, with four suborders during the Mesozoic.

It is unclear as of 2020 whether the Mecoptera form a single clade, or whether the Siphonaptera (fleas) are inside that clade, so that the traditional "Mecoptera" taxon is paraphyletic. However the earlier suggestion that the Siphonaptera are sister to the Boreidae is not supported; instead, there is the possibility that they are sister to another Mecopteran family, the Nannochoristidae. The two possible trees are shown below:

(a) Mecoptera (clades in boldface) is paraphyletic, containing Siphonaptera:

- Antliophora
  - Diptera (true flies)
  - - **Pistillifera** (scorpionflies, hangingflies, 400 spp.)
    - - **Boreidae** (snow scorpionflies, 30 spp.)
      - - **Nannochoristidae** (southern scorpionflies, 8 spp.)
        - Siphonaptera (fleas, 2500 spp.)

(b) Mecoptera is monophyletic, sister to Siphonaptera:

- Antliophora
  - Diptera (true flies)
  - - **Mecoptera**
      - - Pistillifera (scorpionflies, hangingflies, 400 spp.)
        - Boreidae (snow scorpionflies, 30 spp.)
      - Nannochoristidae (southern scorpionflies, 8 spp.)
    - Siphonaptera
      (fleas, 2500 spp.)

=== Internal relationships ===
All the families were formerly treated as part of a single order, Mecoptera. The relationships between the families are, however, a matter of debate. The cladogram, from Cracraft and Donoghue 2004, places the Nannochoristidae as a separate order, with the Boreidae, as the sister group to the Siphonaptera, also as its own order. The Eomeropidae is suggested to be the sister group to the rest of the Mecoptera, with the position of the Bittacidae unclear. Of those other families, the Meropeidae is the most basal, and the relationships of the rest are not completely clear.

- - **Nannomecoptera**
    - Nannochoristidae (Note: Some studies find Nannomecoptera as sister to the Boreidae+Siphonaptera clade.)
  - - - **Neomecoptera**
        - Boreidae (snow scorpionflies)
      - **Siphonaptera** (fleas)
    - - **Mecoptera** sensu stricto
        - Eomeropidae (mainly fossil (Triassic to present), 1 extant sp.)
        - (?) Bittacidae (Note: The position of the Bittacidae is unclear. Two alternative positions, either basal within Mecoptera sensu stricto or sister to Panorpodidae, are shown.) (hangingflies)
        - - Meropeidae (earwigflies)
          - - Choristidae (Australian scorpionflies)
            - Apteropanorpidae (Tasmanian snow scorpionflies)
            - - - (?)Bittacidae (hangingflies)
                - Panorpodidae (short-faced scorpionflies)
              - Panorpidae (Jurassic to present, common scorpionflies)

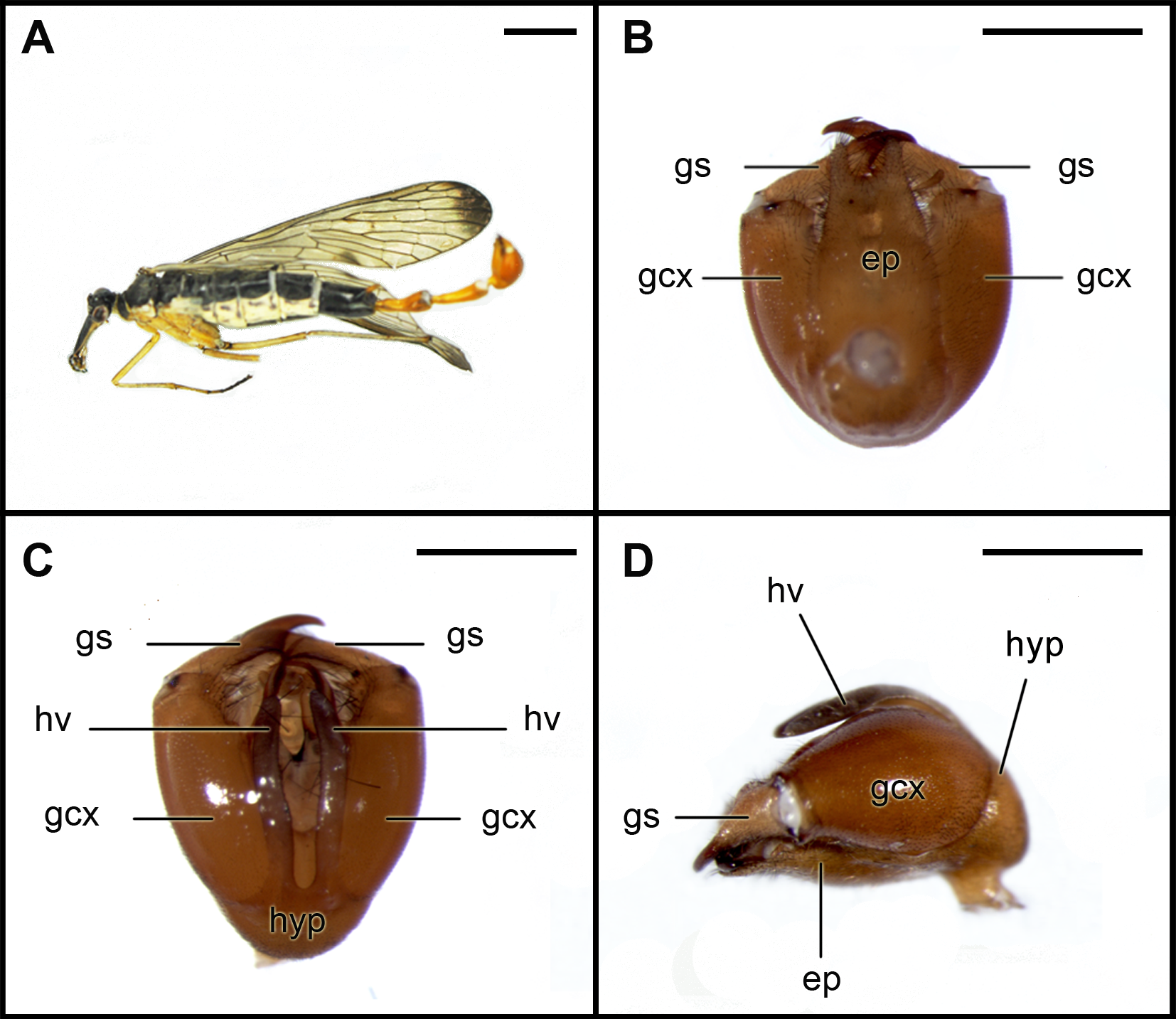
Male Panorpa dubia. A, Body in lateral view; B–D. male genital bulb and gonostyli. B, dorsal view; C, ventral view; D, lateral view. ep, epandrium; gcx, gonocoxite; gs, gonostylus; hv, hypovalva; hyp, hypandrium. Scale bars represent 3 mm in A, 1 mm in B–D

== Biology ==
=== Morphology ===
Mecoptera are small to medium-sized insects with long beaklike rostra, membranous wings and slender, elongated bodies. They have relatively simple mouthparts, with a long labium, long mandibles and fleshy palps, which resemble those of the more primitive true flies. Like many other insects, they possess compound eyes on the sides of their heads, and three ocelli on the top. The antennae are filiform (thread-shaped) and contain multiple segments.

The fore and hind wings are similar in shape, being long and narrow, with numerous cross-veins, and somewhat resembling those of primitive insects such as mayflies. A few genera, however, have reduced wings, or have lost them altogether. The abdomen is cylindrical with eleven segments, the first of which is fused to the metathorax. The cerci consist of one or two segments. The abdomen typically curves upwards in the male, superficially resembling the tail of a scorpion, the tip containing an enlarged structure called the genital bulb.

The caterpillar-like larvae have hard sclerotised heads with mandibles (jaws), short true legs on the thorax, prolegs on the first eight abdominal segments, and a suction disc or pair of hooks on the terminal tenth segment. The pupae have free appendages rather than being secured within a cocoon (they are exarate).

=== Ecology ===
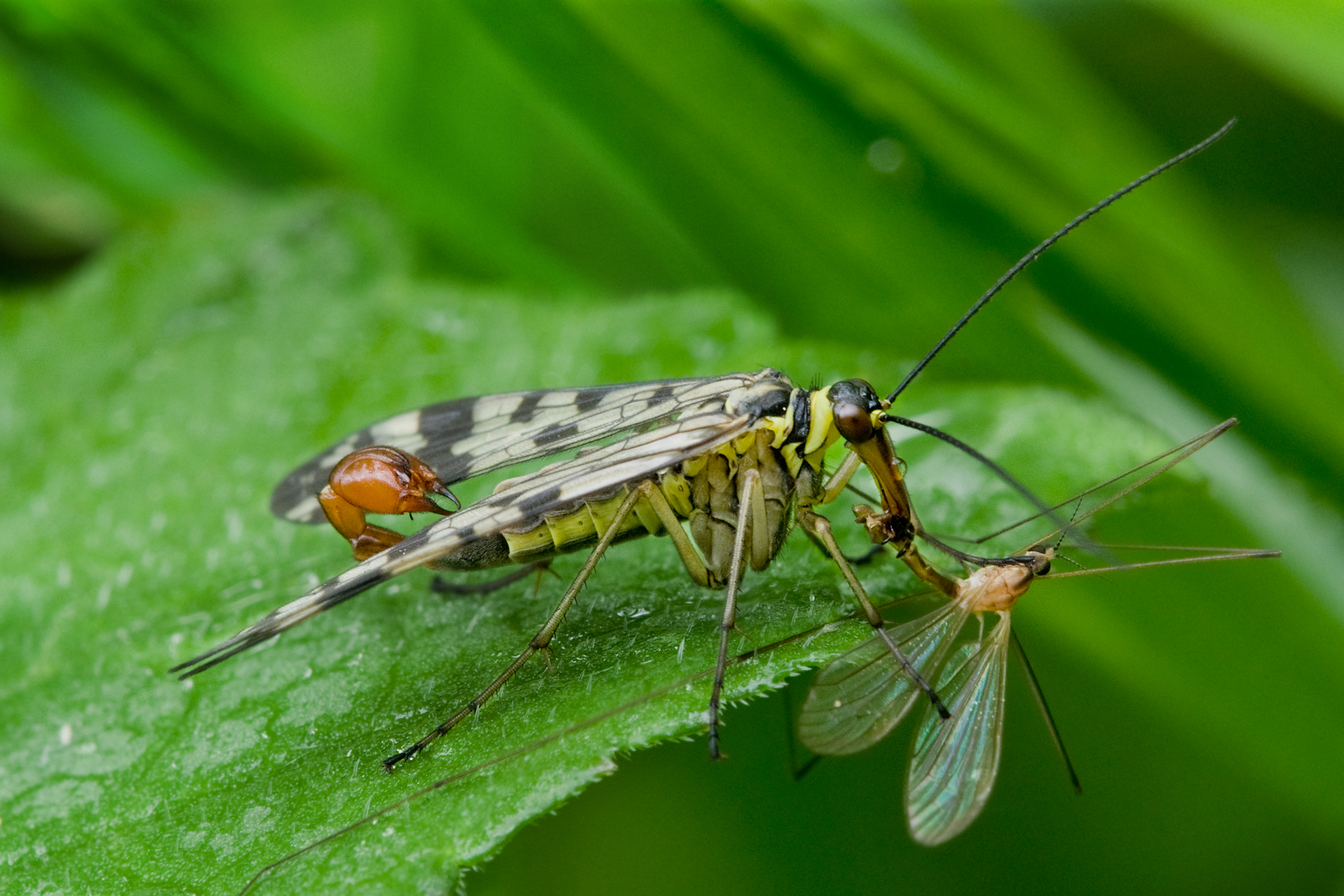
A Panorpid scorpionfly feeding on a dead insect

Mecopterans mostly inhabit moist environments although a few species are found in semi-desert habitats. Scorpionflies, family Panorpidae, generally live in broad-leaf woodlands with plentiful damp leaf litter. Snow scorpionflies, family Boreidae, appear in winter and are to be seen on snowfields and on moss; the larvae being able to jump like fleas. Hangingflies, family Bittacidae, occur in forests, grassland and caves with high moisture levels. They mostly breed among mosses, in leaf litter and other moist places, but their reproductive habits have been little studied, and at least one species, Nannochorista philpotti, has aquatic larvae.

Adult mecopterans are mostly scavengers, feeding on decaying vegetation and the soft bodies of dead invertebrates. Panorpa raid spider webs to feed on trapped insects and even the spiders themselves, and hangingflies capture flies and moths with their specially modified legs. Some groups consume pollen, nectar, midge larvae, carrion and moss fragments. Most mecopterans live in moist environments; in hotter climates, the adults may therefore be active and visible only for short periods of the year.

=== Mating behaviour ===
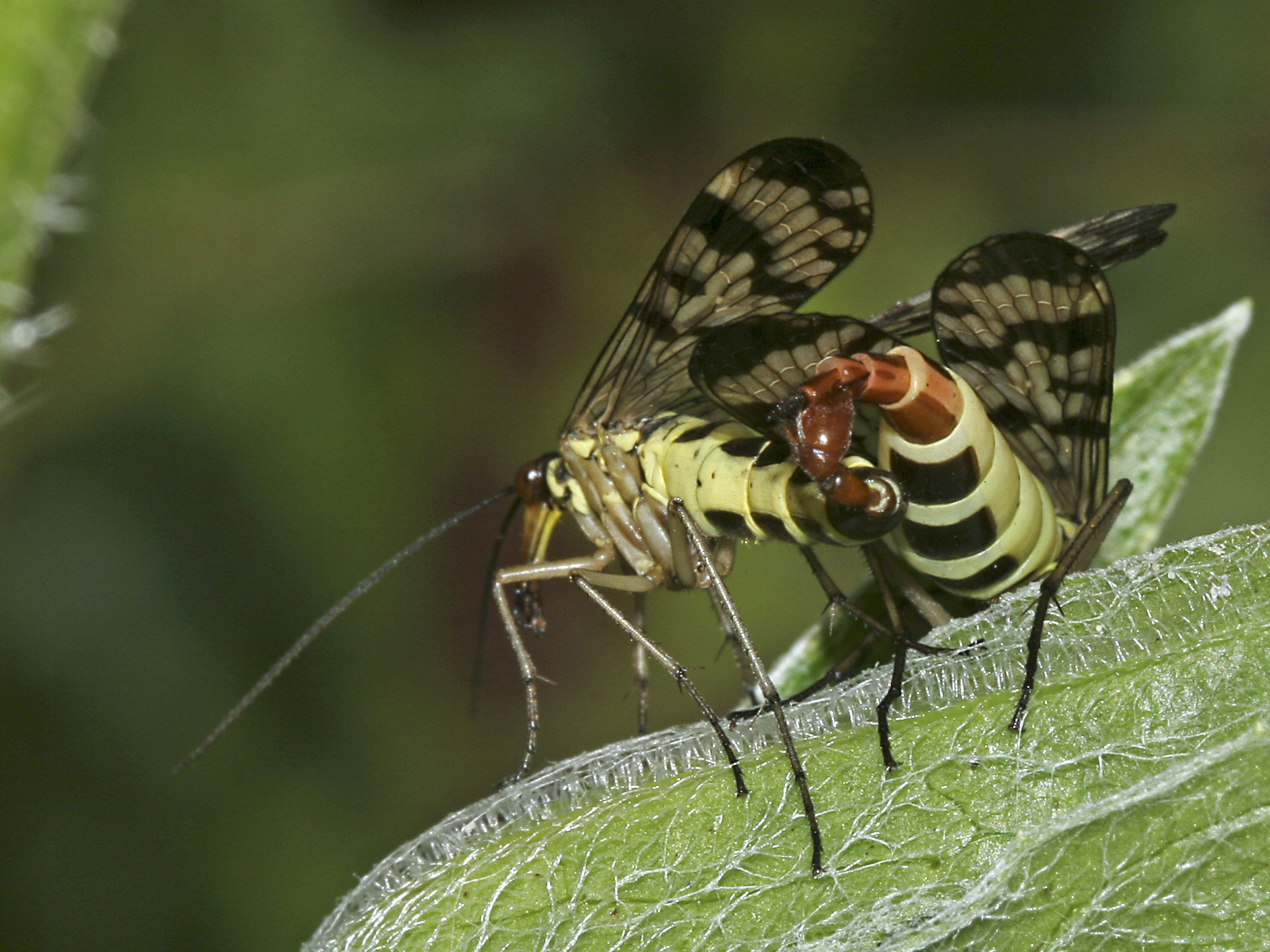
Panorpa communis mating

Various courtship behaviours have been observed among mecopterans, with males often emitting pheromones to attract mates. The male may provide an edible gift such as a dead insect or a brown salivary secretion to the female. Some boreids have hook-like wings which the male uses to pick up and place the female on his back while copulating. Male panorpids vibrate their wings or even stridulate while approaching a female.

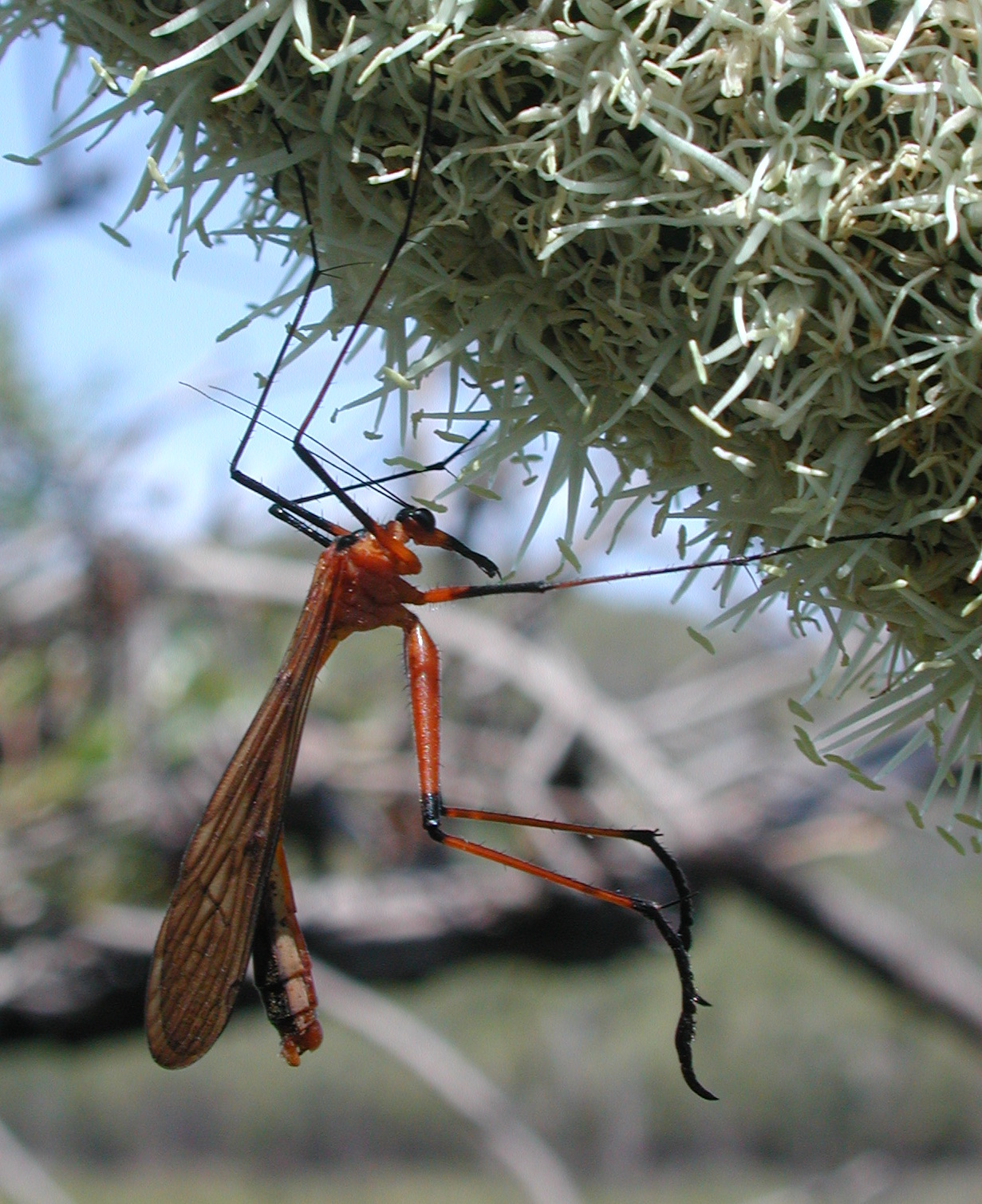
Hangingflies have distinct mating behaviour.

Hangingflies (Bittacidae) provide a nuptial meal in the form of a captured insect prey, such as a caterpillar, bug, or fly. The male attracts a female with a pheromone from vesicles on his abdomen; he retracts these once a female is nearby, and presents her with the prey. While she evaluates the gift, he locates her genitalia with his. If she stays to eat the prey, his genitalia attach to hers, and the female lowers herself into an upside-down hanging position, and eats the prey while mating. Larger prey result in longer mating times. In Hylobittacus apicalis, prey 3 to 14 millimetres (0.12 to 0.55 in) long give between 1 and 17 minutes of mating. Larger males of that species give prey as big as houseflies, earning up to 29 minutes of mating, maximal sperm transfer, more oviposition, and a refractory period during which the female does not mate with other males: all of these increase the number of offspring the male is likely to have.

=== Life-cycle ===
The female lays the eggs in close contact with moisture, and the eggs typically absorb water and increase in size after deposition. In species that live in hot conditions, the eggs may not hatch for several months, the larvae only emerging when the dry season has finished. More typically, however, they hatch after a relatively short period of time. The larvae are usually quite caterpillar-like, with short, clawed, true legs, and a number of abdominal prolegs. They have sclerotised heads with mandibulate mouthparts. Larvae possess compound eyes, which is unique among holometabolous insects. The tenth abdominal segment bears either a suction disc, or, less commonly, a pair of hooks. They generally eat vegetation or scavenge for dead insects, although some predatory larvae are known. The larva crawls into the soil or decaying wood to pupate, and does not spin a cocoon. The pupae are exarate, meaning the limbs are free of the body, and are able to move their mandibles, but are otherwise entirely nonmotile. In drier environments, they may spend several months in diapause, before emerging as adults once the conditions are more suitable.

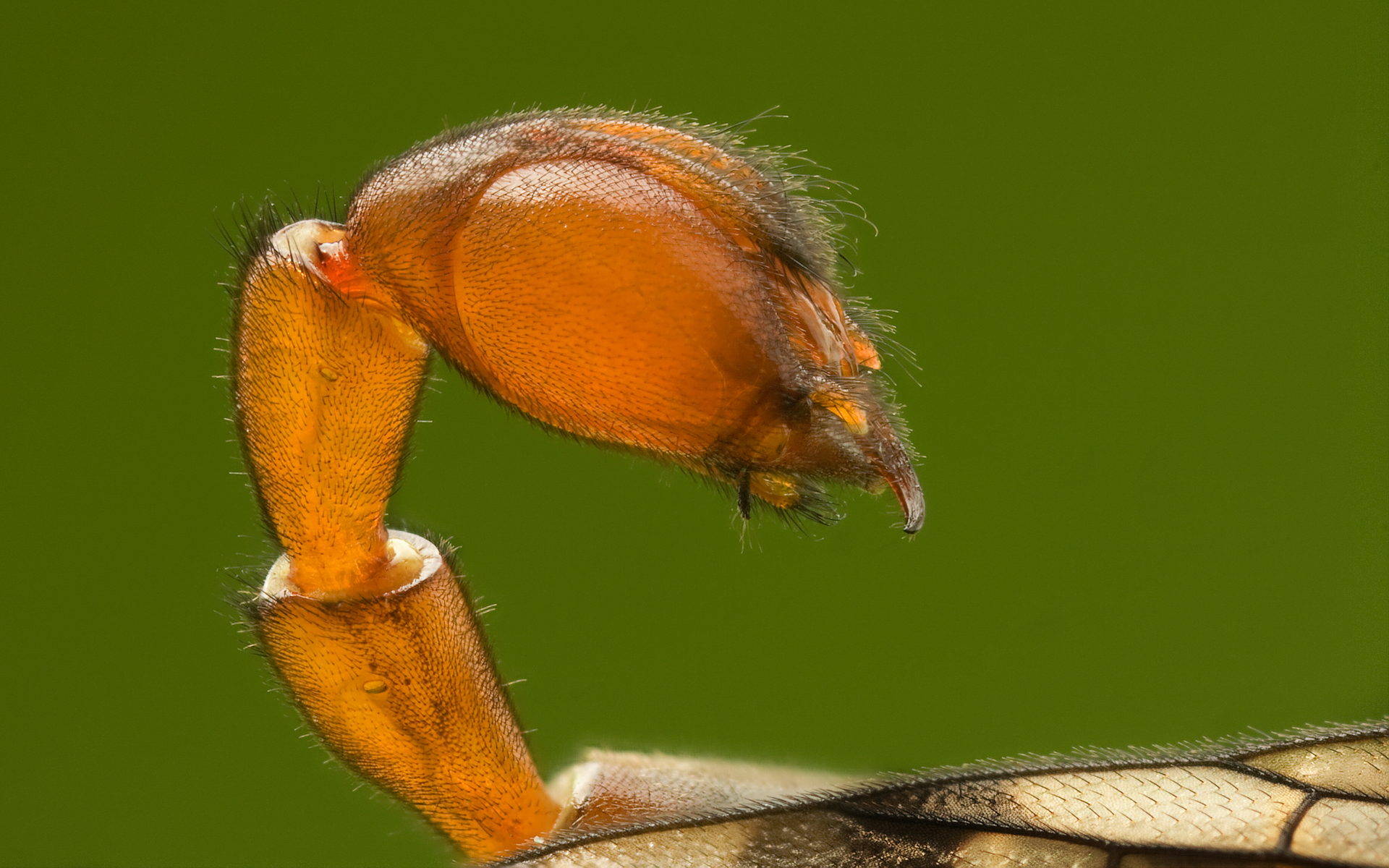
The raised scorpion-like tail of the male has earned the scorpionflies a sinister reputation, but they do not sting.

== Interaction with humans ==
Forensic entomology makes use of scorpionflies' habit of feeding on human corpses. In areas where the family Panorpidae occurs, such as the eastern United States, these scorpionflies can be the first insects to arrive at a donated human cadaver, and remain on a corpse for one or two days. The presence of scorpionflies thus indicates that a body must be fresh.

Scorpionflies are sometimes described as looking "sinister", particularly from the male's raised "tail" resembling a scorpion's sting. A popular but incorrect belief is that they can sting with their tails.
