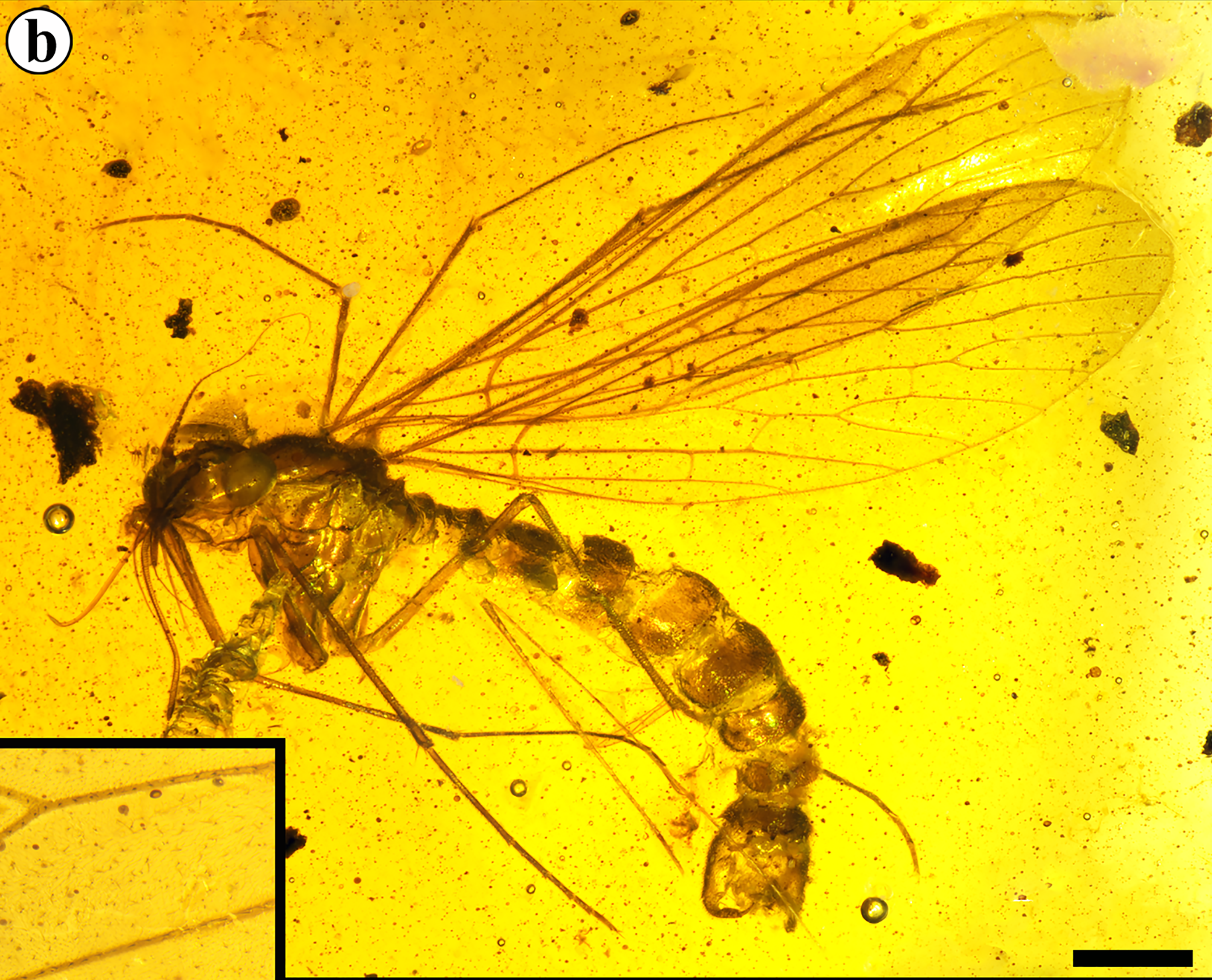

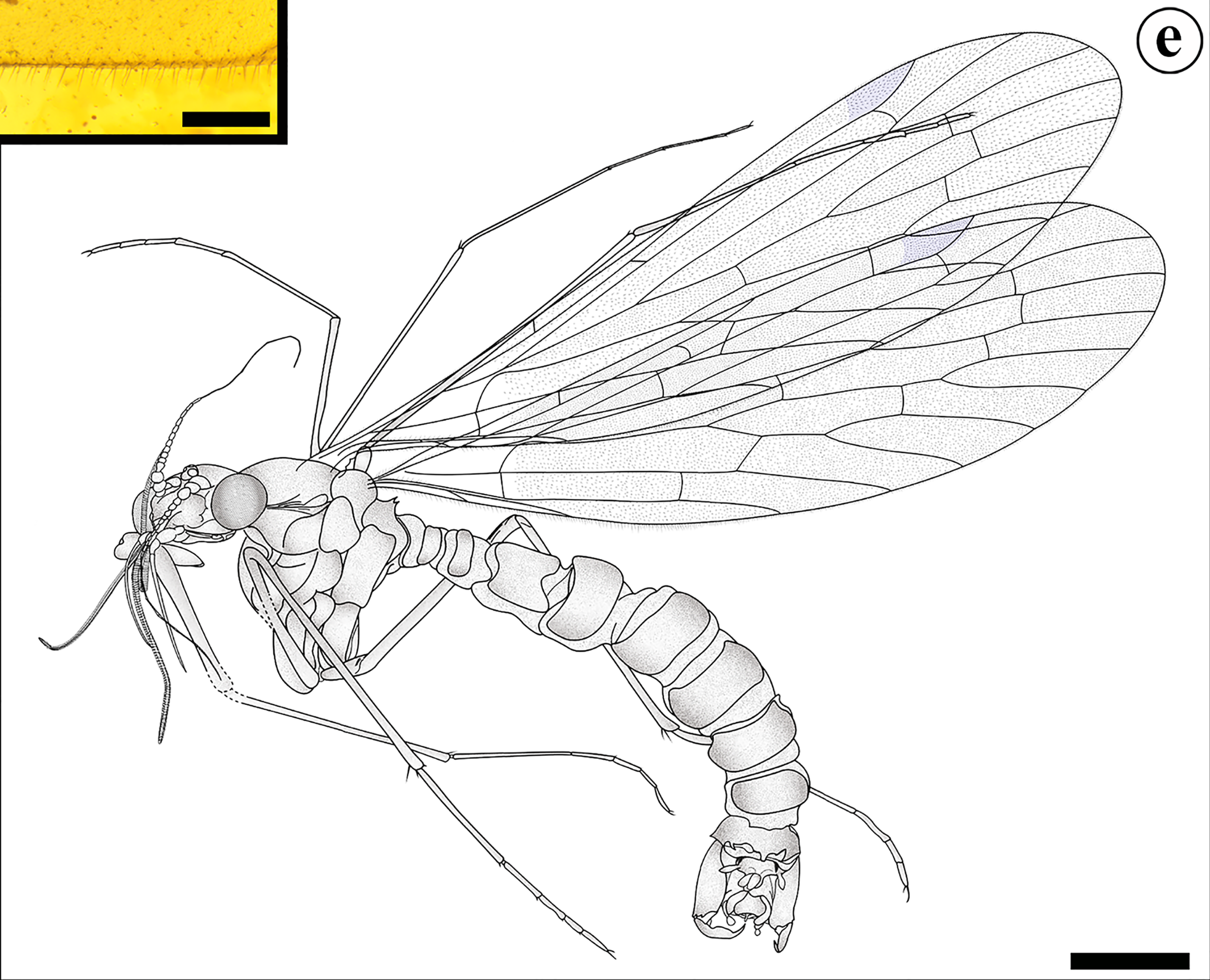
- Paratype of Dualula

Scientific classification
- Kingdom: Animalia
- Phylum: Arthropoda
- Clade: Pancrustacea
- Class: Insecta
- Order: Mecoptera
- Superfamily: †Mesopsychoidea
- Family: †Pseudopolycentropodidae; Handlirsch, 1920

Genera
- Dualula; Parapolycentropus; Pseudopolycentropodes; Pseudopolycentropus; Sinopolycentropus

Synonyms
- Dualulidae Lin, Shih, Labandeira and Ren, 2019

= Pseudopolycentropodidae =

Pseudopolycentropodidae Temporal range: Anisian–Cenomanian

Extinct family of insects

Pseudopolycentropodidae is an extinct family of scorpionflies known from the Mesozoic. Fossils are known from the Middle Triassic (Anisian) to the early Late Cretaceous (Cenomanian). It is part of Mesopsychoidea, a group of scorpionflies with siphonate proboscis. They are suggested to have been nectarivores, feeding off the liquid pollination drops and acting as pollinators for now extinct insect pollinated gymnosperms such as Bennettitales.

== Systematics ==
- Dualula Lin et al. 2019
  - Dualula kachinensis Lin et al. 2019 Burmese amber, mid Cretacoeus (Albian-Cenomanian)
- Parapolycentropus Grimaldi and Rasnitsyn 2005 Burmese amber
  - Parapolycentropus burmiticus Grimaldi and Rasnitsyn 2005
  - Parapolycentropus paraburmiticus Grimaldi and Rasnitsyn 2005
- Pseudopolycentropodes Grimaldi and Fraser 2005
  - Pseudopolycentropodes virginicus Grimaldi and Fraser 2005 Cow Branch Formation, Virginia, Late Triassic (Norian)
- Pseudopolycentropus Handlirsch 1906 Triassic-Late Jurassic
  - Pseudopolycentropus daohugouensis Zhang 2005 Daohugou, China, Middle Jurassic (Callovian)
  - Pseudopolycentropus janeannae Ren et al. 2009 Daohugou, China, Callovian
  - Pseudopolycentropus latipennis Martynov 1927 Karabastau Formation, Kazakhstan, Late Jurassic (Oxfordian)
  - Pseudopolycentropus madygenicus Novokshonov 1997 Madygen Formation, Kyrgyzstan, Late Triassic (Carnian)
  - Pseudopolycentropus novokshonovi Ren et al. 2009 Daohugou, China, Callovian
  - Pseudopolycentropus obtusus Bode 1953 Posidonia Shale, Germany, Early Jurassic (Toarcian)
  - Pseudopolycentropus perlaeformis Geinitz 1884 Green Series, Germany, Toarcian
  - Pseudopolycentropus triangularis Handlirsch 1920 Charmouth Mudstone Formation, UK, Early Jurassic (Sinemurian), "Green Series", Germany, Toarcian
  - Pseudopolycentropus triasicus Papier et al. 1996 Grès à Voltzia, France, Röt Formation, Germany, Middle Triassic (Anisian)
- Sinopolycentropus Shih et al. 2011
  - Sinopolycentropus rasnitsyni Shih et al. 2011 Daohugou, China, Callovian
