= Protorthophlebia =

Protorthophlebia Temporal range: Middle Triassic–Late Jurassic

Scientific classification
- Domain: Eukaryota
- Kingdom: Animalia
- Phylum: Arthropoda
- Class: Insecta
- Order: Mecoptera
- Family: †Protorthophlebiidae; Soszyńska-Maj, Krzemiński & Kopeć, 2019
- Genus: †Protorthophlebia; Tillyard, 1933

Type species
- Protorthophlebia latipennis Tillyard, 1933

Species
- See text

Extinct genus of insects

Protorthophlebia is an extinct genus of scorpionflies, known from the Triassic and Jurassic periods of Eurasia. It was originally considered a member of the family Orthophlebiidae, but was later placed as the only genus within the family Protorthophlebiidae within the superfamily Panorpoidea.

== Taxonomy ==
After, with locality information after.

- Protorthophlebia aksaji Martynova 1948 Dzhil Formation, Kyrgyzstan, Early Jurassic (Hettangian-Sinemurian)
- Protorthophlebia cuneata Bode 1953 Posidonia Shale, Germany, Early Jurassic (Toarcian)
- Protorthophlebia curta Hong 2009 Tongchuan Formation, China, Middle Triassic (Ladinian)
- Protorthophlebia egloni Martynova 1948 Dzhil Formation, Kyrgyzstan, Early Jurassic (Hettangian-Sinemurian)
- Protorthophlebia hebes Sukatsheva 1985 Uda Formation, Russia, Late Jurassic (Oxfordian/Kimmeridgian)
- Protorthophlebia ladinica Hong et al. 2002 Tongchuan Formation, China, Middle Triassic (Ladinian)
- Protorthophlebia latipennis Tillyard 1933 (type) Blue Lias, England, Hettangian Charmouth Mudstone Formation, England, Early Jurassic (Sinemurian)
- Protorthophlebia lecta Sukatsheva 1985 Ichetuy Formation, Russia, Late Jurassic (Oxfordian)
- Protorthophlebia punctata Soszyńska-Maj & Krzemiński 2019 Daohugou, China, Middle Jurassic (Callovian)
- Protorthophlebia strigata Zhang 1996 Xishanyao Formation, China, Middle Jurassic (Aalenian/Bajocian)
- Protorthophlebia triassica Hong et al. 2002 Tongchuan Formation, China, Middle Triassic (Ladinian)
- Protorthophlebia yanqingensis Hong and Xiao 1997 Houcheng Formation, China, Late Jurassic (Oxfordian)
