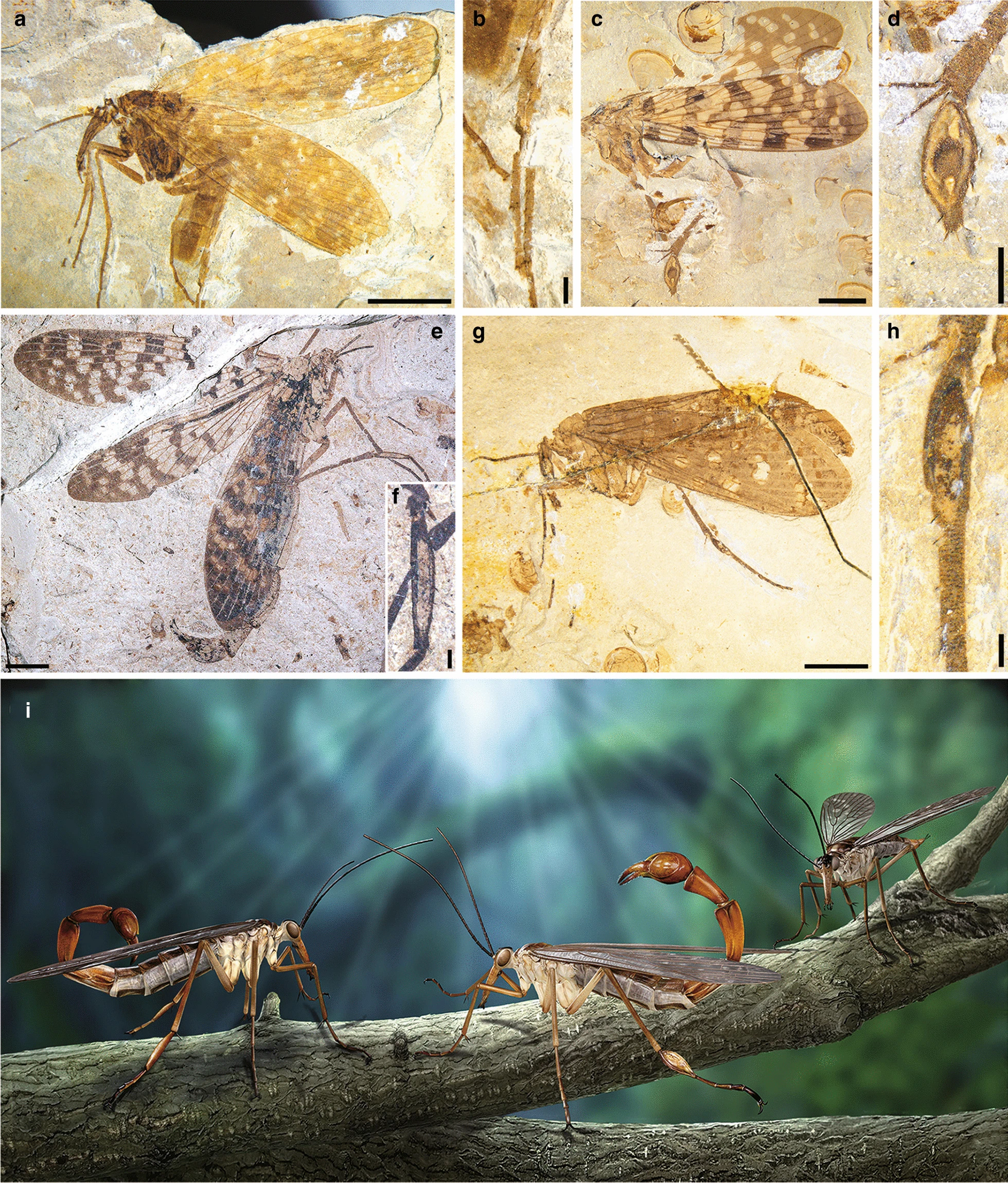
- Species of Orthophlebia and Mesopanorpa from the Middle Jurassic of China

Scientific classification
- Kingdom: Animalia
- Phylum: Arthropoda
- Clade: Pancrustacea
- Class: Insecta
- Order: Mecoptera
- Superfamily: Panorpoidea
- Family: †Orthophlebiidae; Handlirsch, 1906

Genera
- See text

= Orthophlebiidae =

Orthophlebiidae Temporal range: Middle Triassic–Campanian

Extinct family of insects

Orthophlebiidae is an extinct family of scorpionflies known from the Triassic to Cretaceous, belonging to the superfamily Panorpoidea. The family is poorly defined and is probably paraphyletic, representing many primitive members of Panorpoidea with most species only known from isolated wings, and has such been considered a wastebasket taxon.

== Systematics ==
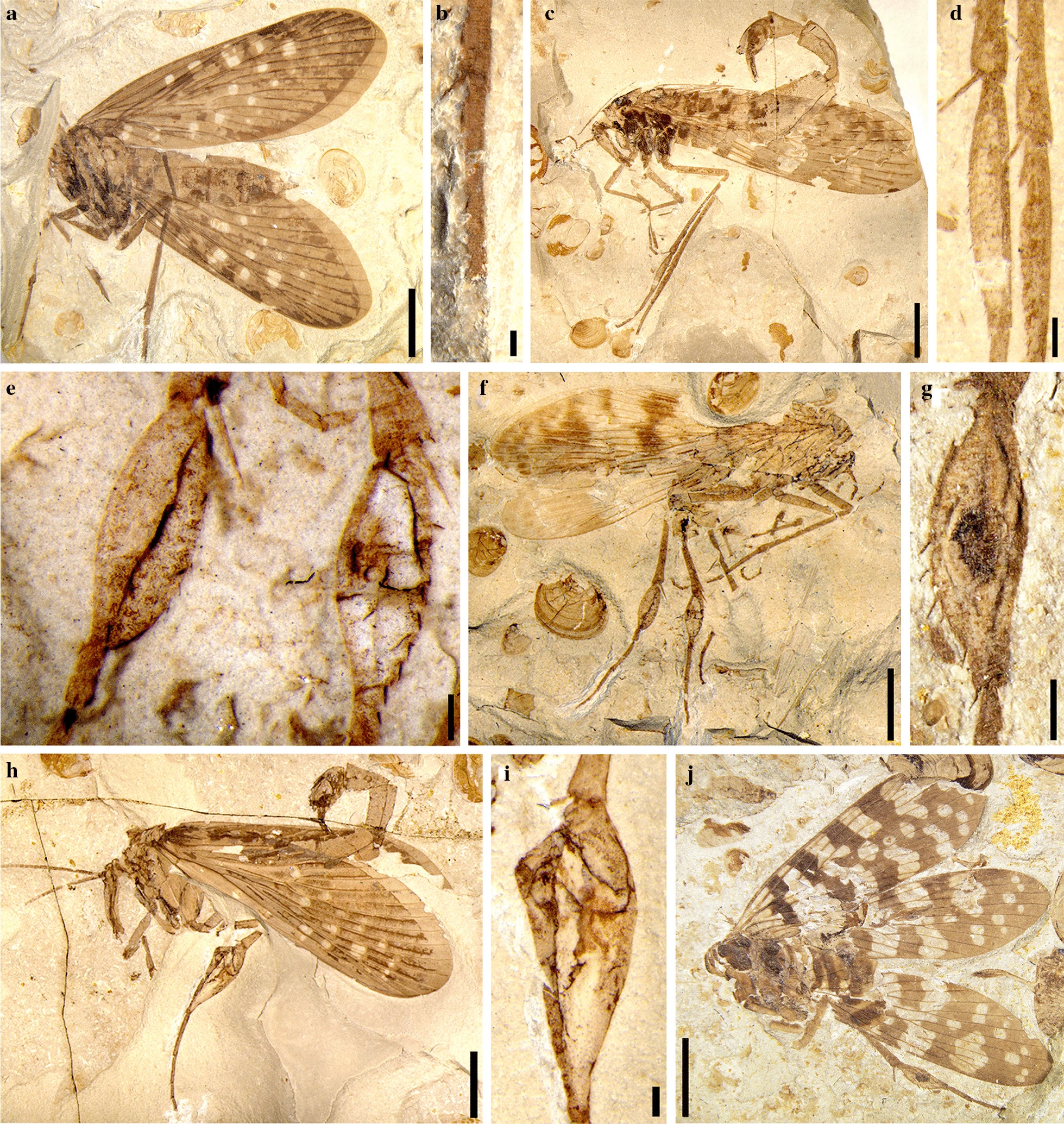

Based on

The genus Protorthophlebia has been moved to the separate family Protorthophlebiidae.

- Burmorthophlebia Soszyńska-Maj, Krzemiński and Wang, 2022, Burmese amber, Myanmar, Late Cretaceous (Cenomanian)
- Choristopanorpa Riek 1950 Hawkesbury Sandstone, Australia, Middle Triassic (Anisian), Magyden Formation, Kyrgyzstan, Late Triassic (Carnian), Koonwarra Fossil Bed, Australia, Early Cretaceous (Aptian)
- Cretacochorista Jell and Duncan 1986 Koonwarra Fossil Bed, Australia, Aptian
- Mesopanorpa Handlirsch 1906
  - Mesopanorpa angarensis Martynov 1927 Cheremkhovskaya Formation, Russia, Early Jurassic (Toarcian)
  - Mesopanorpa brodiei Tillyard 1933 Whitby Mudstone, United Kingdom, Toarcian, Badaowan Formation, China, Early Jurassic (Sinemurian)
  - Mesopanorpa brooksorum Jarzembowski and Soszyńska-Maj, 2018 Weald Clay, United Kingdom, Early Cretaceous (Barremian)
  - Mesopanorpa densa Zhang 1996 Badaowan Formation, China, Sinemurian
  - Mesopanorpa enormis Lin 1986 Shiti Formation, China, Middle Jurassic (Bajocian)
  - Mesopanorpa fanshanensis Ren 1995 Lushangfen Formation, China, Aptian
  - Mesopanorpa felix Martynov 1927 Karabastau Formation, Kazakhstan, Late Jurassic (Oxfordian)
  - Mesopanorpa formosa Bode 1953 Posidonia Shale, Germany, Toarcian
  - Mesopanorpa gambra Lin 1980 Laocun Formation, China, Barremian
  - Mesopanorpa hartungi Brauer et al. 1889 Dzhil Formation, Kyrgyzstan, Early Jurassic (Hettangian-Sinemurian), Cheremkhovskaya Formation, Russia, Toarcian
  - Mesopanorpa incerta Martynov 1927 Cheremkhovskaya Formation, Russia, Toarcian
  - Mesopanorpa kuliki Martynova 1948 Dzhil Formation, Kyrgyzstan, Hettangian-Sinemurian, Badaowan Formation, China, Sinemurian
  - Mesopanorpa kuschmurunensis Martynova 1956, Kushmurun Formation, Russia, Early Jurassic
  - Mesopanorpa maculata Handlirsch 1939 "Green Series", Germany, Toarcian
  - Mesopanorpa martynovae Sukacheva 1990 Glushkovo Formation, Russia, Late Jurassic (Tithonian)
  - Mesopanorpa monstrosa Zhang 1996 Badaowan Formation, China, Sinemurian
  - Mesopanorpa obtusa Bode 1953 Posidonia Shale, Germany, Toarcian
  - Mesopanorpa unica Sukatsheva 1985 Ichetuy Formation, Russia, Oxfordian
  - Mesopanorpa unicolor Martynov 1937 Sulyukta Formation, Kyrgyzstan, Toarcian
  - Mesopanorpa yaojiashanensis Lin 1980 Laocun Formation, China, Barremian
- Mesorpa Xu, Zhao & Bashkuev 2026 Nenjiang Formation, China, Santonian–Campanian
- Mesorthophlebia Willmann 1989 Dzhil Formation, Kyrgyzstan, Hettangian-Sinemurian
- Parachorista Lin 1976 Jianshangou Formation, China, Barremian
- Parorthophlebia Bode 1953 Posidonia Shale, Germany, Toarcian
- Stenopanorpa Handlirsch 1906 Lulworth Formation, United Kingdom, Early Cretaceous (Berriasian)
- Subfamily Gigaphlebiinae Soszyńska-Maj and Krzemiński, 2018
  - Gigaphlebia Soszyńska-Maj and Krzemiński, 2018 Dzhil Formation, Kyrgyzstan, Hettangian-Sinemurian, Daohugou, China, Middle Jurassic (Callovian), Karabastau Formation, Kazakhstan, Oxfordian
  - Longiphlebia Soszyńska-Maj and Krzemiński, 2018 Daohugou, Tiaojishan Formation, China, Callovian
- Juraphlebia, Soszyńska-Maj & Krzemiński 2019 Daohugou, China, Callovian
- Orthophlebia Westwood 1845 Middle Triassic-Early Cretaceous, Eurasia
  - Orthophlebia (Dolichophlebia) Hong and Zhang 2004
    - Orthophlebia (Dolichophlebia) ladinica Hong 2009 Tongchuan Formation, China, Middle Triassic (Ladinian)
    - Orthophlebia (Dolichophlebia) xiaofangzhangziensis Hong 1983 Jiulongshan Formation, China, Callovian
  - Orthophlebia aequalis Martynov 1937 Kyzyl-Kiya, Kyrgyzstan, Pliensbachian
  - Orthophlebia anglica Handlirsch 1939 United Kingdom, Late Triassic (Rhaetian)
  - Orthophlebia angustata Martynov 1937 Sulyukta Formation, Kyrgyzstan, Toarcian
  - Orthophlebia bella Handlirsch 1939 United Kingdom, Rhaetian/Hettangian
  - Orthophlebia bifurcata Giebel 1856 Lulworth Formation, United Kingdom, Berriasian
  - Orthophlebia bolboica Sukacheva 1990 Byankino Formation, Russia, Tithonian
  - Orthophlebia brunsvicensis Bode 1905 Posidonia Shale, "Green Series" Germany, Toarcian
  - Orthophlebia capillata Whalley 1985 Charmouth Mudstone Formation, England, Sinemurian
  - Orthophlebia colorata Zhang 1996 Badaowan Formation, China, Sinemurian
  - Orthophlebia compacta Bode 1953 Posidonia Shale, Germany, Toarcian
  - Orthophlebia confusa Willmann 1977 Lilstock Formation, United Kingdom, Rhaetian
  - Orthophlebia curta Martynova 1948 Dzhil Formation, Kyrgyzstan, Hettangian-Sinemurian
  - Orthophlebia deformis Lin 1986 Shiti Formation, China, Bajocian
  - Orthophlebia effusa Martynova 1948 Dzhil Formation, Kyrgyzstan, Hettangian-Sinemurian
  - Orthophlebia elenae Willmann and Novokshonov 1998 Karabastau Formation, Kazakhstan, Oxfordian
  - Orthophlebia elongata Handlirsch 1939 "Green Series" Germany, Toarcian
  - Orthophlebia exculpta Zhang 1996 Xishanyao Formation, China, Aalenian/Bajocian
  - Orthophlebia extensa Martynov 1937 Sulyukta Formation, Kyrgyzstan, Toarcian
  - Orthophlebia fallerslebensis Bode 1953 Posidonia Shale, Germany, Toarcian
  - Orthophlebia fracta Sukacheva 1990 Godymboyskaya Formation, Russia, Aptian
  - Orthophlebia furcata Handlirsch 1939 England, Rhaetian/Hettangian
  - Orthophlebia fuscipennis Handlirsch 1906 "Green Series" Germany, Toarcian
  - Orthophlebia germanica Handlirsch 1906 "Green Series" Germany, Toarcian
  - Orthophlebia gracilis Handlirsch 1939 Lilstock Formation, England, Rhaetian
  - Orthophlebia gubini Novokshonov and Sukatsheva 2003 Ulan Malgait Formation, Mongolia, Tithonian
  - Orthophlebia heidemariae Willmann and Novokshonov 1998 Karabastau Formation, Kazakhstan, Oxfordian
  - Orthophlebia intermedia Giebel 1856 Lilstock Formation, England, Rhaetian
  - Orthophlebia jejuna Sukatsheva 1985 Makarova Formation, Russia, Toarcian
  - Orthophlebia karabonica Sukacheva 1990 Gidarinskaya Formation, Russia, Aptian
  - Orthophlebia laesa Handlirsch 1939 England, Rhaetian
  - Orthophlebia latebrosa Sukatsheva 1985 Badaowan Formation, China, Sinemurian Cheremkhovskaya Formation, Russia, Toarcian
  - Orthophlebia latipennisimilis Bode 1953 Posidonia Shale, Germany, Toarcian
  - Orthophlebia lauta Sukatsheva 1985 Cheremkhovskaya Formation, Russia, Toarcian
  - Orthophlebia liadis Handlirsch 1939 "Green Series" Germany, Toarcian
  - Orthophlebia liaoningensis Ren 1997 Yixian Formation, China, Aptian
  - Orthophlebia liassica Mantell 1844 Lilstock Formation, United Kingdom, Rhaetian/Hettangian
  - Orthophlebia limnophila Handlirsch 1906 "Green Series" Germany, Toarcian
  - Orthophlebia lithographica Willmann and Novokshonov 1998 Solnhofen Limestone, Germany, Tithonian
  - Orthophlebia longicauda Willmann and Novokshonov 1998 Karabastau Formation, Kazakhstan, Oxfordian
  - Orthophlebia luanpingensis Hong 1983 Jiulongshan Formation, China, Callovian
  - Orthophlebia maculata Martynov 1927 Dzhil Formation, Kyrgyzstan, Hettangian-Sinemurian, Karabastau Formation, Kazakhstan, Oxfordian
  - Orthophlebia mongolica Sukatsheva 1985 Zhargalant Formation, Mongolia, Middle Jurassic (Bathonian)
  - Orthophlebia nana Handlirsch 1939 United Kingdom, Rhaetian/Hettangian
  - Orthophlebia nervulosa Qiao et al. 2012 Jiulongshan Formation, China, Callovian
  - Orthophlebia obunca Sukatsheva 1985 Itat Formation, Russia, Bathonian
  - Orthophlebia parvula Handlirsch 1939 United Kingdom, Rhaetian/Hettangian
  - Orthophlebia phryganoides Martynov 1925 Karabastau Formation, Kazakhstan, Oxfordian
  - Orthophlebia pictipennis Tillyard 1933 Lilstock Formation, United Kingdom, Rhaetian/Hettangian
  - Orthophlebia pulchra Martynova 1956 Kushmurun Formation, Kazakhstan, Early Jurassic
  - Orthophlebia pygmaea Handlirsch 1939 United Kingdom, Rhaetian
  - Orthophlebia quadrimacula Lin 1982 Zhiluo Formation, China, Middle Jurassic
  - Orthophlebia radialis Handlirsch 1939 "Green Series" Germany, Toarcian
  - Orthophlebia retorrida Sukatsheva 1985 Cheremkhovskaya Formation, Russia, Toarcian
  - Orthophlebia rossica Martynova 1948 Dzhil Formation, Kyrgyzstan, Hettangian-Sinemurian
  - Orthophlebia rotundipennis Martynov 1937 Sulyukta Formation, Kyrgyzstan, Toarcian Hanshan Formation, China, Bajocian
  - Orthophlebia shartegica Novokshonov and Sukatsheva 2003 Ulan Malgait Formation, Mongolia, Tithonian
  - Orthophlebia shurabica Martynov 1937 Sulyukta Formation, Kyrgyzstan, Toarcian
  - Orthophlebia speciosa Bode 1953 Posidonia Shale, Germany, Toarcian
  - Orthophlebia stigmatica Handlirsch 1939 Lilstock Formation, United Kingdom, Rhaetian/Hettangian
  - Orthophlebia varia Martynova 1948 Dzhil Formation, Kyrgyzstan, Hettangian-Sinemurian
  - Orthophlebia venosa Martynov 1937 Sulyukta Formation, Kyrgyzstan, Toarcian
  - Orthophlebia vernacula Martynova 1948 Dzhil Formation, Kyrgyzstan, Hettangian-Sinemurian
  - Orthophlebia vicina Handlirsch 1939 "Green Series" Germany, Toarcian
  - Orthophlebia yangjuanxiangensis Hong 1985 Xiahuayuan Formation, China, Toarcian
  - Orthophlebia yaogouensis Hong 1983 Jiulongshan Formation, China, Callovian
