= Michael F. Whiting =

Michael Frank Whiting is the director of the Brigham Young University (BYU) DNA Sequencing Center and an associate professor in BYU's Department of Integrative Biology. Whiting received his bachelor's degree from BYU and his Ph.D. from Cornell University.

Whiting is an expert on the evolution of Diptera and other insects and was the author of the article on Strepsiptera in the Encyclopedia of Insects. His research has mainly focused on using DNA sequencing to unlock the evolutionary history of insects.

Whiting has also written on why the critics of the Book of Mormon on DNA issues have overstated their case.

Whiting was also involved in the research that led to the discovery of how stick insects had lost their wings and then re-evolved them several million years later.
