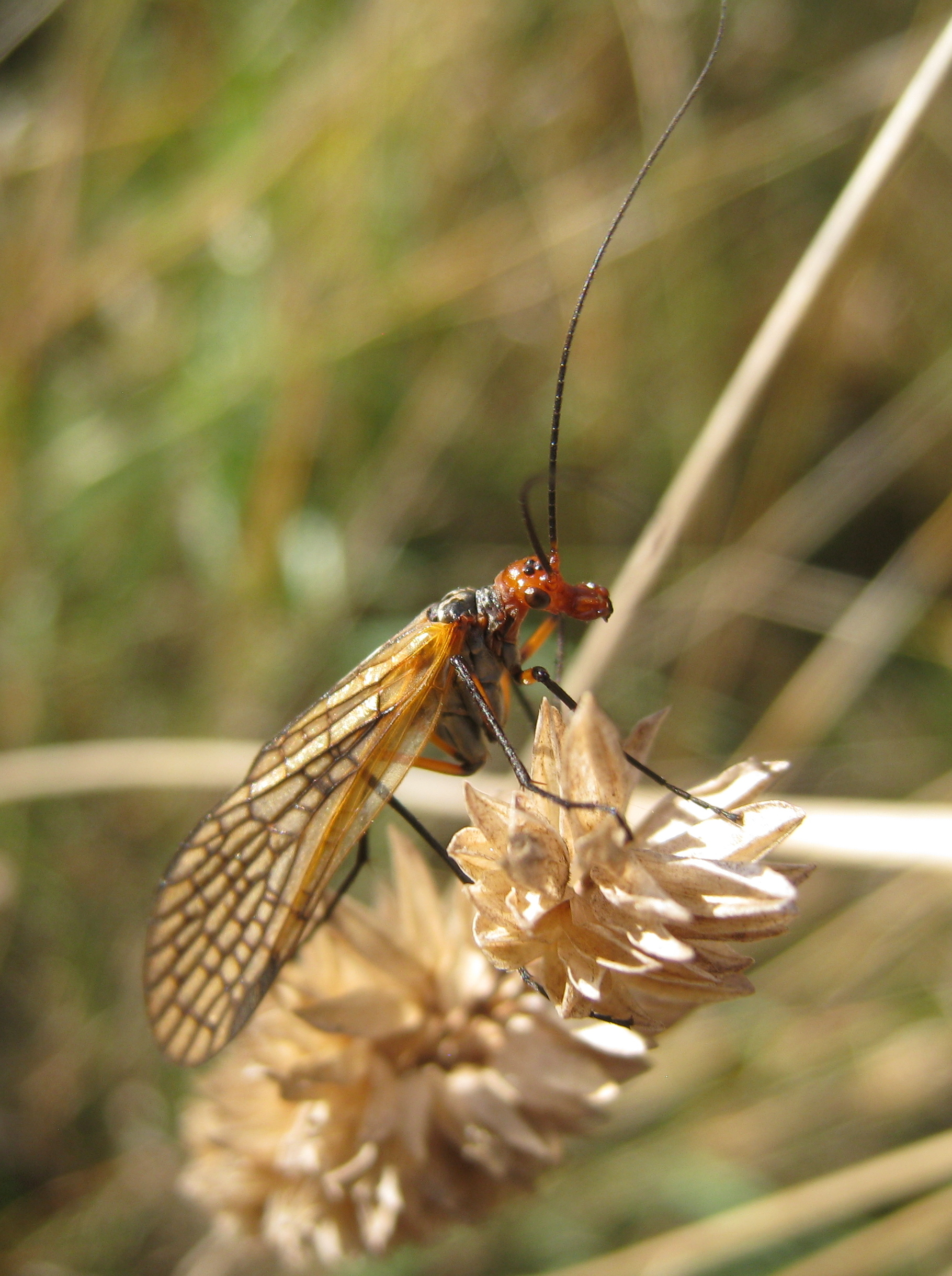
- Chorista australis

Scientific classification
- Kingdom: Animalia
- Phylum: Arthropoda
- Clade: Pancrustacea
- Class: Insecta
- Order: Mecoptera
- Family: Choristidae; Esben-Petersen, 1915

Genera
- Chorista; Meridiochorista; Taeniochorista

= Choristidae =

Choristidae Temporal range: Eocene – Present

Family of insects

The Choristidae are a small (only eight species in three genera) family of scorpionflies known only from Australia. Their larvae are found in moss mats.

== Species ==
This list is adapted from the World Checklist of extant Mecoptera species: Choristidae (unless cited otherwise) and is complete as of 1997.

- Chorista Klug, 1838
  - Chorista australis Klug, 1838
  - Chorista luteola Westwood, 1846
  - †Chorista sobrina Riek, 1952
- Meridiochorista Lambkin, 1996
  - Meridiochorista insolita Riek, 1973
  - Meridiochorista ruficeps Newman, 1850
- Taeniochorista Esben-Petersen, 1914
  - Taeniochorista bifurcata Riek, 1973
  - Taeniochorista nigrita Riek, 1973
  - Taeniochorista pallida Esben-Petersen, 1914
  - Taeniochorista similis Riek, 1973
