= Worcestobia =

Worcestobia Temporal range: Carnian–Rhaetian

Scientific classification
- Domain: Eukaryota
- Kingdom: Animalia
- Phylum: Arthropoda
- Class: Insecta
- Order: Mecoptera
- Family: †Worcestobiidae; Soszyńska-Maj et al, 2017
- Genus: †Worcestobia; Soszyńska-Maj et al, 2017

Species
- Worcestobia gigantea (Tillyard, 1933); Worcestobia haradai (Ueda, 1991)

Extinct genus of scorpionflies

Worcestobia is an extinct genus of scorpionfly. It is the only member of the family Worcestobiidae. It was described to contain two species originally assigned to Orthophlebia. Worcestobia gigantea was originally described by Robert John Tillyard in 1933 for NHMUK I. 11102 a hindwing found in the Rhaetian aged Lilstock Formation near Strensham, Worcestershire, United Kingdom The other species, Worcestobia haradai was described in 1991 from KMNH IP 000,002 a forewing found in the Carnian aged Momonoki Formation in a mine near Okuhata, Yamaguchi Prefecture, Japan. It is distinguished from other members of Panorpoidea by "the forking of Rs_{2} into two long veins Rs_{2a} and Rs_{2b}"
