= Austropanorpa =

Austropanorpa Temporal range: Toarcian–Eocene

Scientific classification
- Domain: Eukaryota
- Kingdom: Animalia
- Phylum: Arthropoda
- Class: Insecta
- Order: Mecoptera
- Family: †Austropanorpidae; Willmann, 1977
- Genus: †Austropanorpa; Riek, 1952

Type species
- †Austropanorpa australis Riek, 1952

Other species
- †Austropanorpa martynovae (Sukatsheva, 1985)

Extinct genus of scorpionfly

Austropanorpa is an extinct genus of scorpionfly. It is the only member of the family Austropanorpidae. The type species, A. australis was described by Edgar Riek in 1952 based on two incomplete forewings from the Redbank Plains Formation of Queensland, of probable Eocene age, and was assigned to Panorpidae. Later, it was recognised as distinctive enough to be assigned to its own monotypic family by Rainer Willman in 1977. In 2018 the species "Orthophlebia" martynovae from the Early Jurassic (Toarcian) aged Cheremkhovo Formation near Lake Baikal in Siberia, described by Irina Sukacheva in 1985, was recognised as belonging to the genus. The genus is distinguished from other mecopterans by having nine branched radial sectors and four veins in the medial sector of both wings, as opposed to living panorpoids which are typically 5 and rarely 6 branched.
