= Snow flea =

Snow flea is a common name for several arthropods, not including true fleas:

- Boreidae, a family of scorpionflies known as snow fleas in the British Isles, especially:
  - Boreus hyemalis, a species of scorpionfly that crawls on snow
- Springtails of the family Hypogastruridae, like Hypogastrura nivicola, a species of springtail known as snow flea in North America, or Hypogastrura socialis from Europe and many others.
- Several springtails of the family Isotomidae from the genuera Desoria and Vertagopus, known as snow fleas in Europe
