= Climate change in Wyoming =

Climate change in the US state of Wyoming

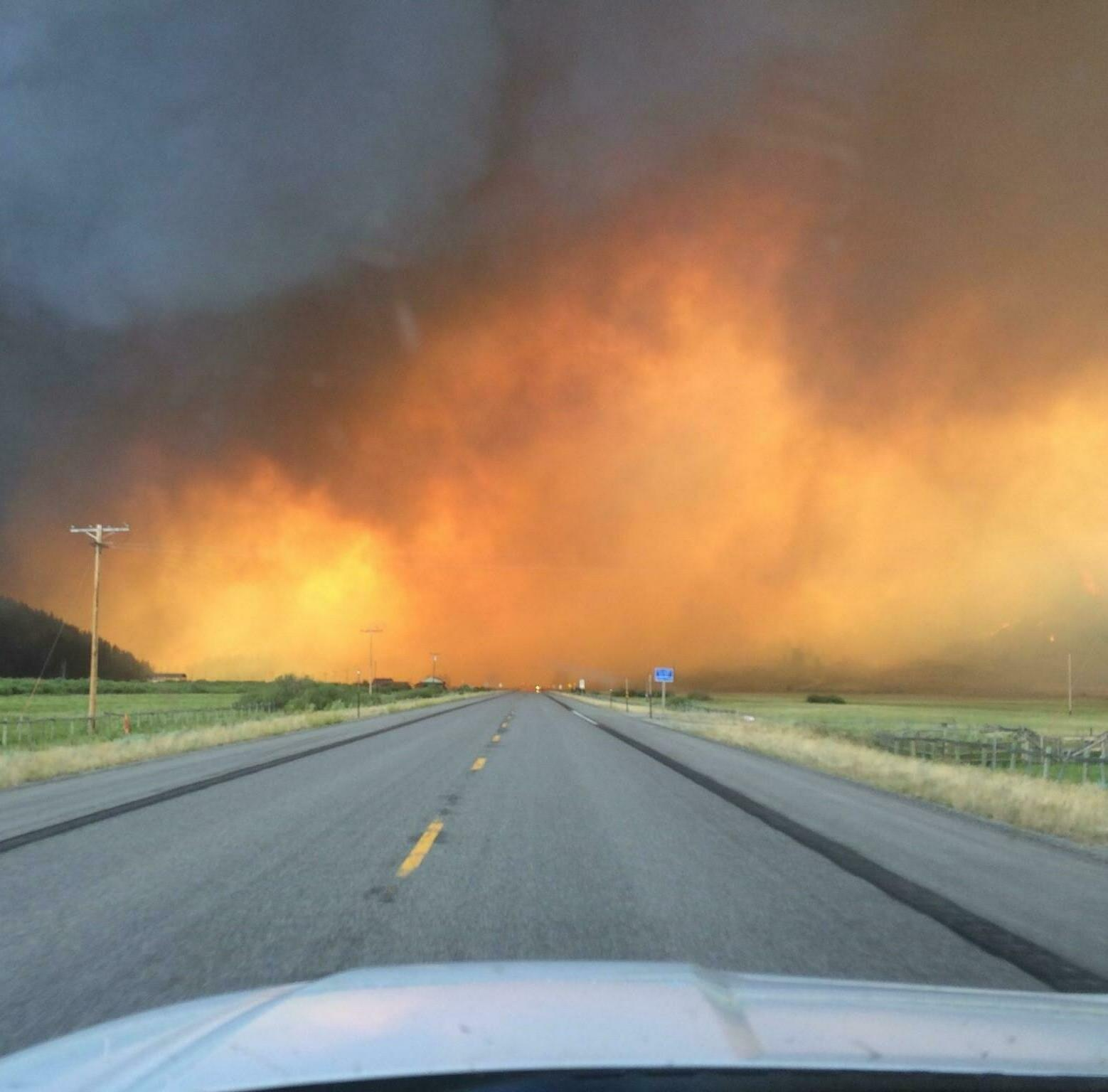
Cliff Creek Fire, 2016

On a per-person basis, Wyoming emits more carbon dioxide than any other state or any other country: 276,000 pounds (125,000 kg) of it per capita a year, because of burning coal, which provides nearly all of the state's electrical power.

Over the last century, the average temperature in Laramie, Wyoming, has increased 1.5 °F (0.8 °C).

Over the course of the 21st century, climate in Wyoming may change even more. For example, based on projections made by the Intergovernmental Panel on Climate Change and results from the United Kingdom Hadley Centre’s climate model (HadCM2), a model that accounts for both greenhouse gases and aerosols, by 2100 temperatures in Wyoming could increase by 4 °F (2 °C) in spring and fall (with a range of 2-7 °F), 5 °F (2.5 °C) in summer (with a range of 2-8 °F), and 6 °F (3 °C) in winter (with a range of 3-11 °F) . Precipitation is estimated to decrease slightly in summer (with a range of 0-10%), increase by 10% in spring and fall (with a range of 5-20%), and increase by 30% in winter (with a range of 10-50%). Other climate models may show different results, especially regarding estimated changes in precipitation. The amount of precipitation on extreme wet or snowy days in winter is likely to increase. The frequency of extreme hot days in summer would increase because of the general warming trend. It is not clear how the severity of storms might be affected, although an increase in the frequency and intensity of winter storms is possible.

== Impacts ==
=== Human health ===
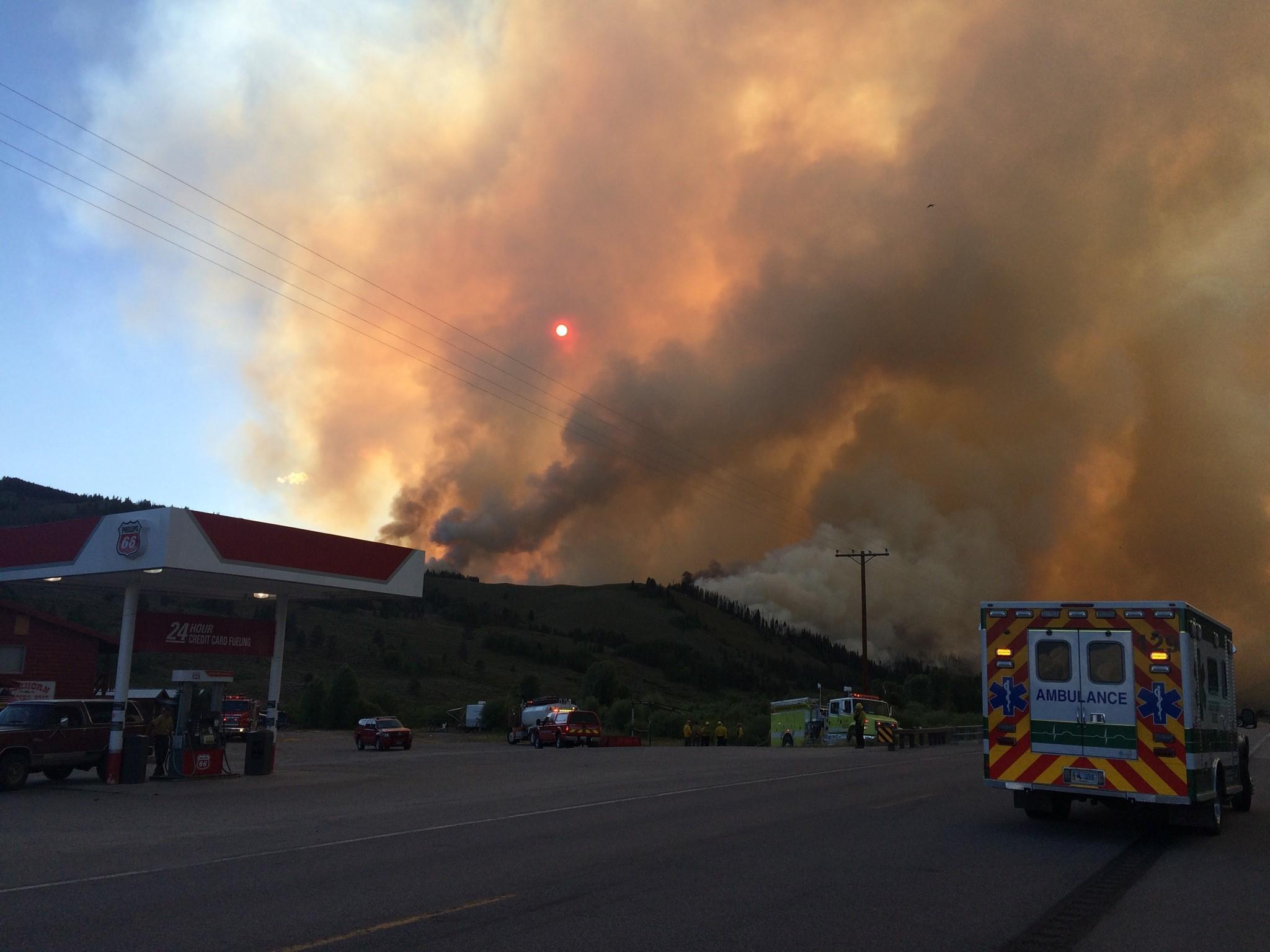
Smoke pollution from the Cliff Creek Fire, Bondurant

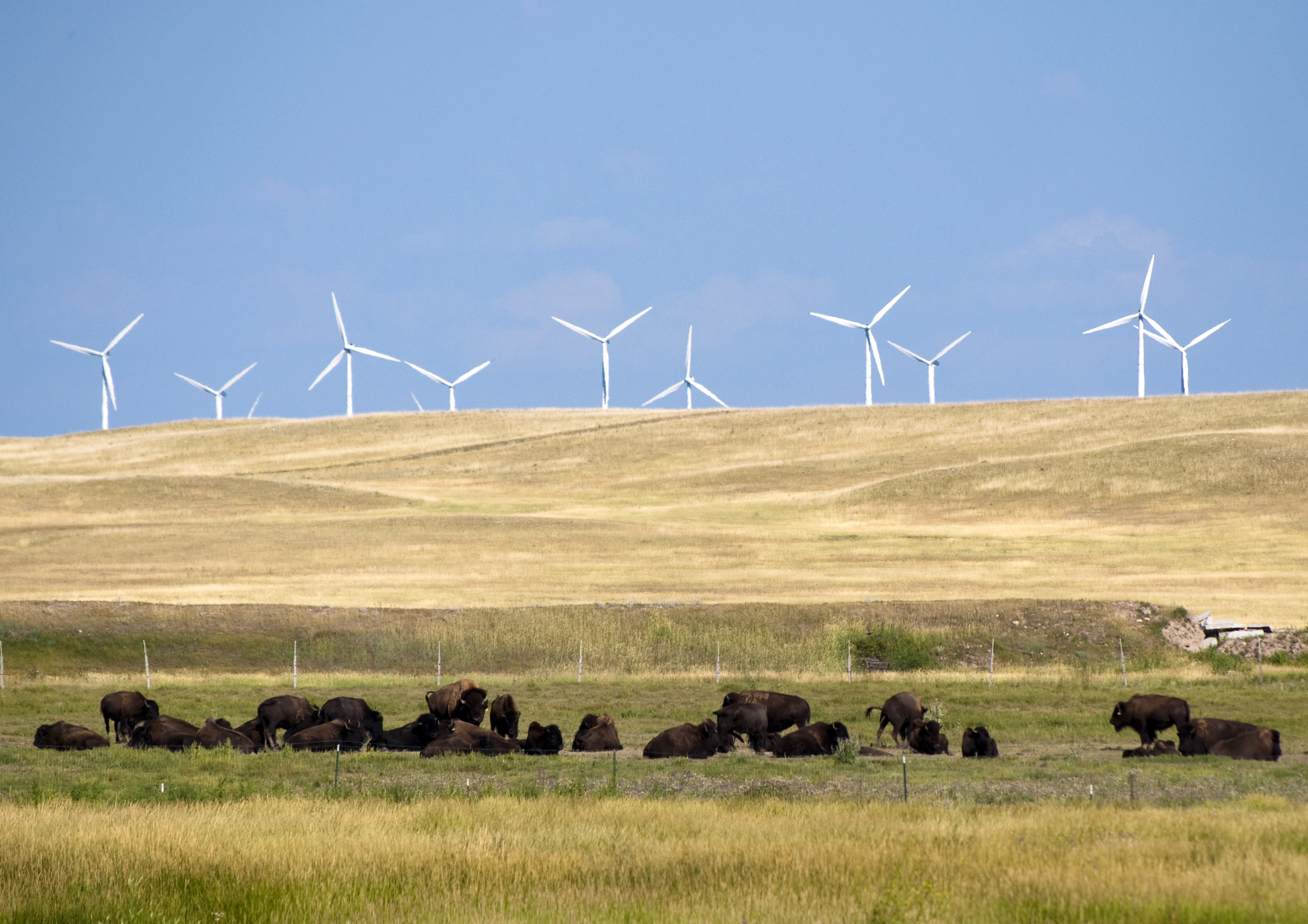
Wind farm

Warmer temperatures could increase the incidence of Lyme disease and other tick-borne diseases in Wyoming, because populations of ticks, and their rodent hosts, could increase under warmer temperatures and increased vegetation. Increased runoff from heavy rainfall could increase water-borne diseases such as giardia, cryptosporidia, and viral and bacterial gastroenteritis.

=== Water resources ===
The headwaters of several rivers originate in Wyoming and flow in all directions into the Missouri, Snake, and Colorado River basins. Within the state, water is plentiful in some parts and scarce in others.

Winter snow accumulation and spring snowmelt strongly affect many of Wyoming’s rivers. A warmer climate could result in less winter snowfall, more winter rain, and faster, earlier spring snowmelt. In the summer, without increases in rainfall of at least 15-20%, higher temperatures and increased evaporation could lower streamflows and lake levels. Less water would be available to support irrigation, hydropower generation, public water supplies, fish and wildlife habitat, recreation, and mining.

Competition for water could increase on the plains, where agricultural and industrial users compete for available water. Similarly, in northeastern Wyoming, which has large deposits of minerals, coal, and petroleum, competition between mining, energy, and other users could intensify for the meager summer streamflows.

Groundwater levels in several areas of the state are declining because of increased pumpage for irrigation and urban development. Less spring and summer recharge could lower groundwater levels.

Tourism and recreation, important components of Wyoming’s economy, also depend on adequate supplies of clean water.

Higher temperatures and lower flows could impair water quality by concentrating pollutants and reducing assimilative capacity.

=== Agriculture ===
Warmer climates and less soil moisture due to increased evaporation may increase the need for irrigation. However, these same conditions could decrease water supplies, which also may be needed by natural ecosystems, urban populations, industry, and other users.

Under these conditions, livestock tend to gain less weight and pasture yields decline, limiting forage.

=== Forests ===
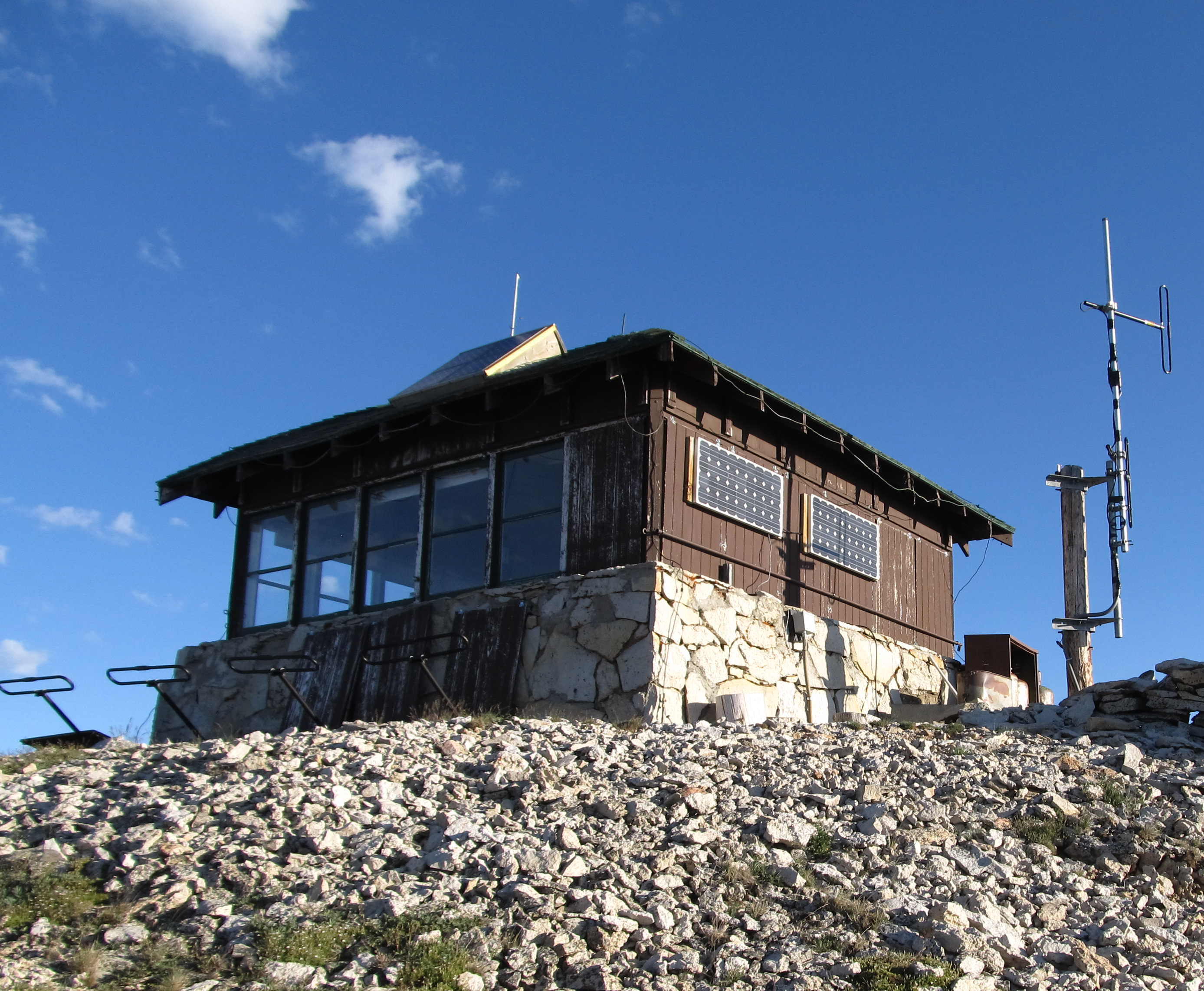

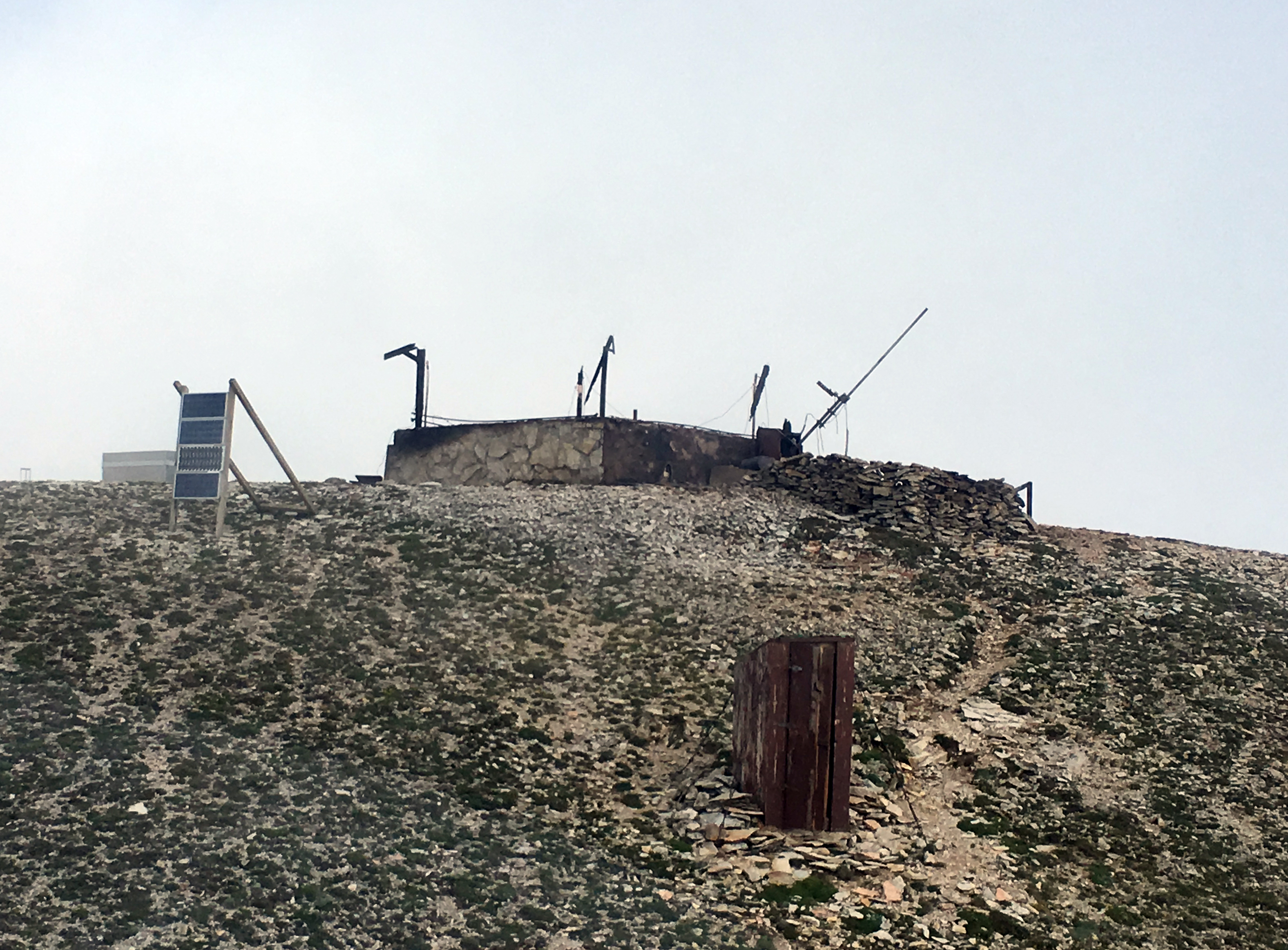
Mount Holmes Fire Lookout before and after it burned down in the eponymous 2019 wildfire

With changes in climate, the extent of forested areas in Wyoming could change little or decline by as much as 15-30%.

Hotter, drier weather could increase the frequency and intensity of wildfires, threatening both property and forests. Drier conditions would reduce the range and health of ponderosa and lodgepole forests, and increase their susceptibility to fire. Grasslands and rangeland could expand into previously forested areas in the western part of the state. Milder winters could increase the likelihood of insect outbreaks and of subsequent wildfires in the dead fuel left after such an outbreak.

=== Ecosystems ===
Since the massive fires of 1988, when about a third of Yellowstone National Park burned, scientists have been paying close attention to the possible threats from climate change. Experts agree that the fires of 1988 came about as result of a winter drought, a hot dry summer, and unusually strong winds. Also important were the large areas of highly flammable, old-growth lodgepole pine forest.

Under normal conditions, large fires like those of 1988 occur only once in every few generations. But, with approximately 40% of the Yellowstone still vulnerable to large-scale burns, any increased fire risk due to climate change would pose a significant problem. The replacement of old-growth forest stands by younger stands could threaten northern twinflower, Fairy Slipper, pine marten, and goshawk. Outbreaks of defoliating attacks by western spruce budworms could occur more frequently and become much more damaging for the conifer forests.

Climate change also poses a threat to the high alpine systems, and this zone could disappear in many areas. Local extinctions of alpine species such as arctic gentian, alpine chaenactis, rosy finch, and water pipit could be expected as a result of habitat loss and fragmentation. Even a modest warming and drying could reduce whitebark pine habitat by up to 90% within 50 years. Whitebark pine nuts and army cutworm moth caterpillars, which are found in these forests, provide vital food for Wyoming’s grizzly bear population. Whitebark pine forest may be replaced with Douglas fir, and on the lower slopes, forest would give way to treeless landscapes dominated by big sagebrush, Idaho fescue, and bluebunch wheatgrass.

== Action on climate change ==
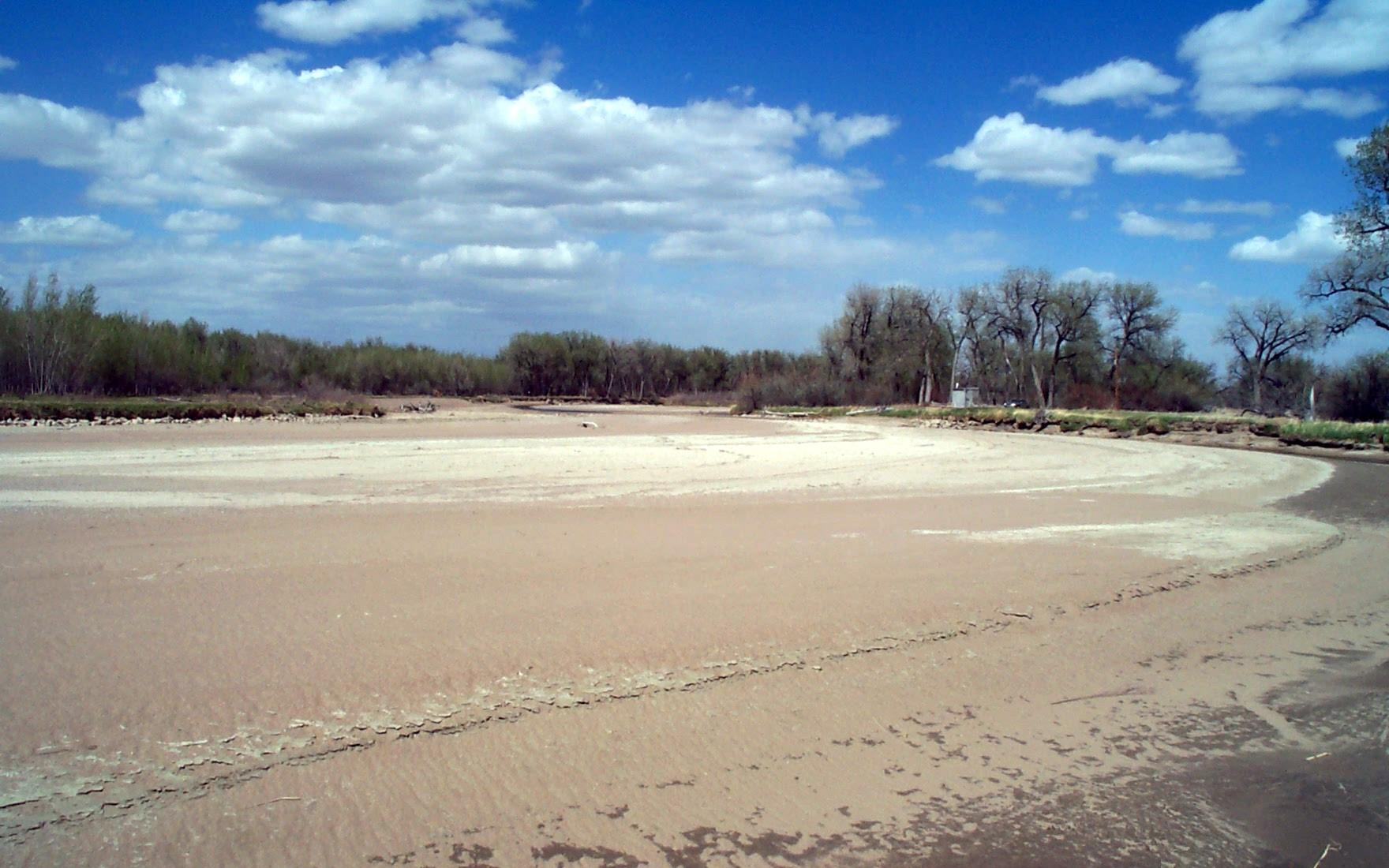
Dried-up North Platte River, 2002

=== Renewable energy ===
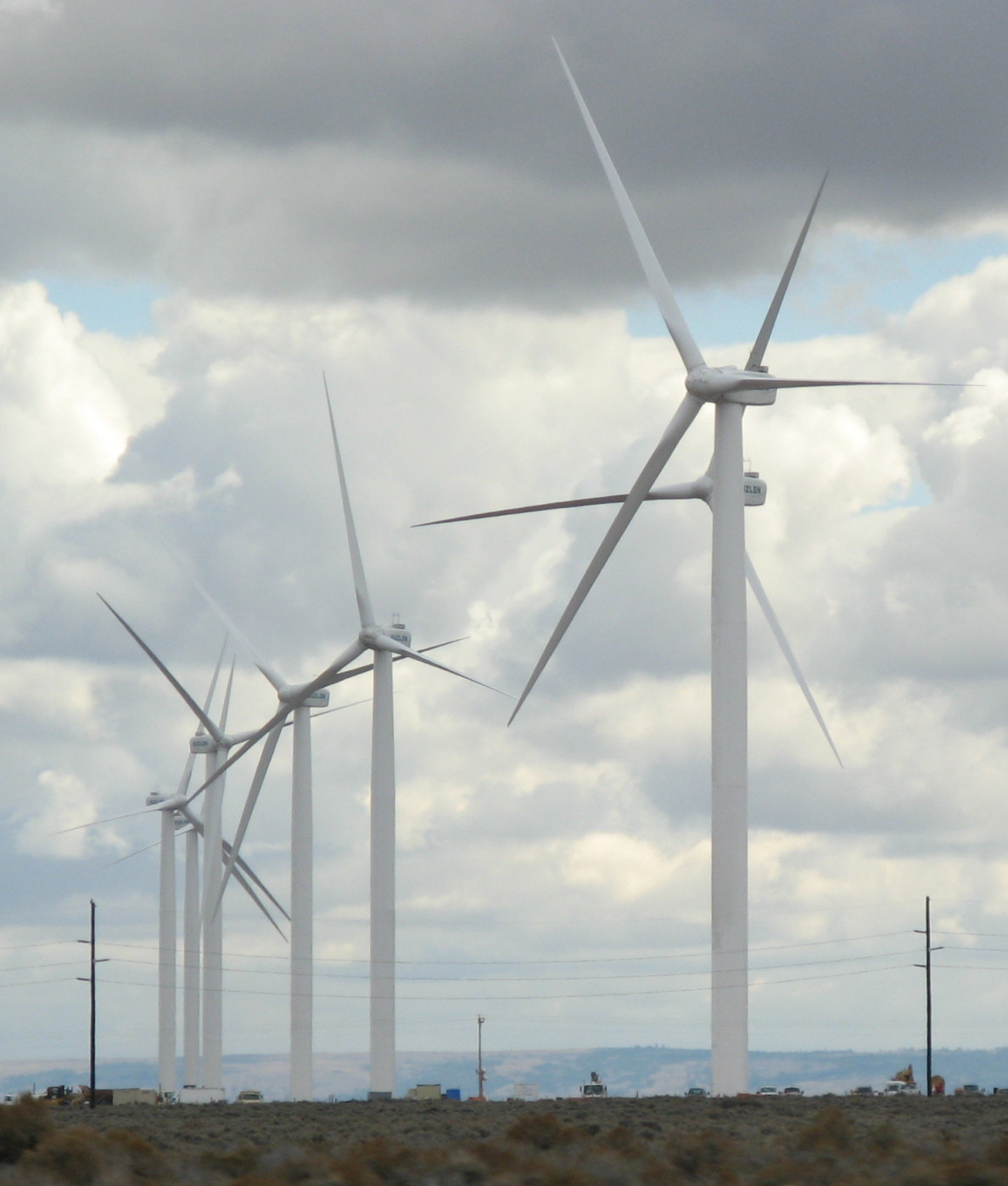
Wind farm

The Wyoming Infrastructure Authority (WIA) used to have partnerships to secure tax credit bonds for construction of renewable energy projects. WIA accepted proposals for projects using resources from wind, biomass, geothermal, solar, small irrigation power, trash combustion, certain refined coal production, and certain hydropower projects.

The Energy Policy Act of 2005 authorized $500 million Clean Renewable Energy Bonds (CREBS) for government agencies. The bonds served as tax credits for the private-sector partners and provide as tax-free capital financing for renewable energy projects.

WIA was an organization formed by the Wyoming Legislature in 2004 to encourage economic development in Wyoming through the expansion of the state's electricity transmission capacity. Since the renewable power projects would use the transmission capability managed by WIA, the agency evaluated proposals that meet its criteria.

==== Geothermal energy ====
In cooperation with the Wyoming Business Council, the Converse Area New Development Organization drafted an initiative to advance geothermal energy development in Wyoming. The state is a prime candidate for geothermal direct use applications such as home heating and cooling, spas, agriculture, aquaculture, greenhouses, and space heating.

The Wyoming Geothermal Outreach Program aims to increase public awareness of opportunities in geothermal energy, as it works with government and industry to improve the state's regulatory and economic environment. It will promote environmentally compatible heat and power, industrial growth, and economic development. The program will create geothermal information-sharing tools, including workshops, a Web site, and information packets. Representatives will engage in trade missions to other states to research best practices in geothermal development.

==== Solar ====
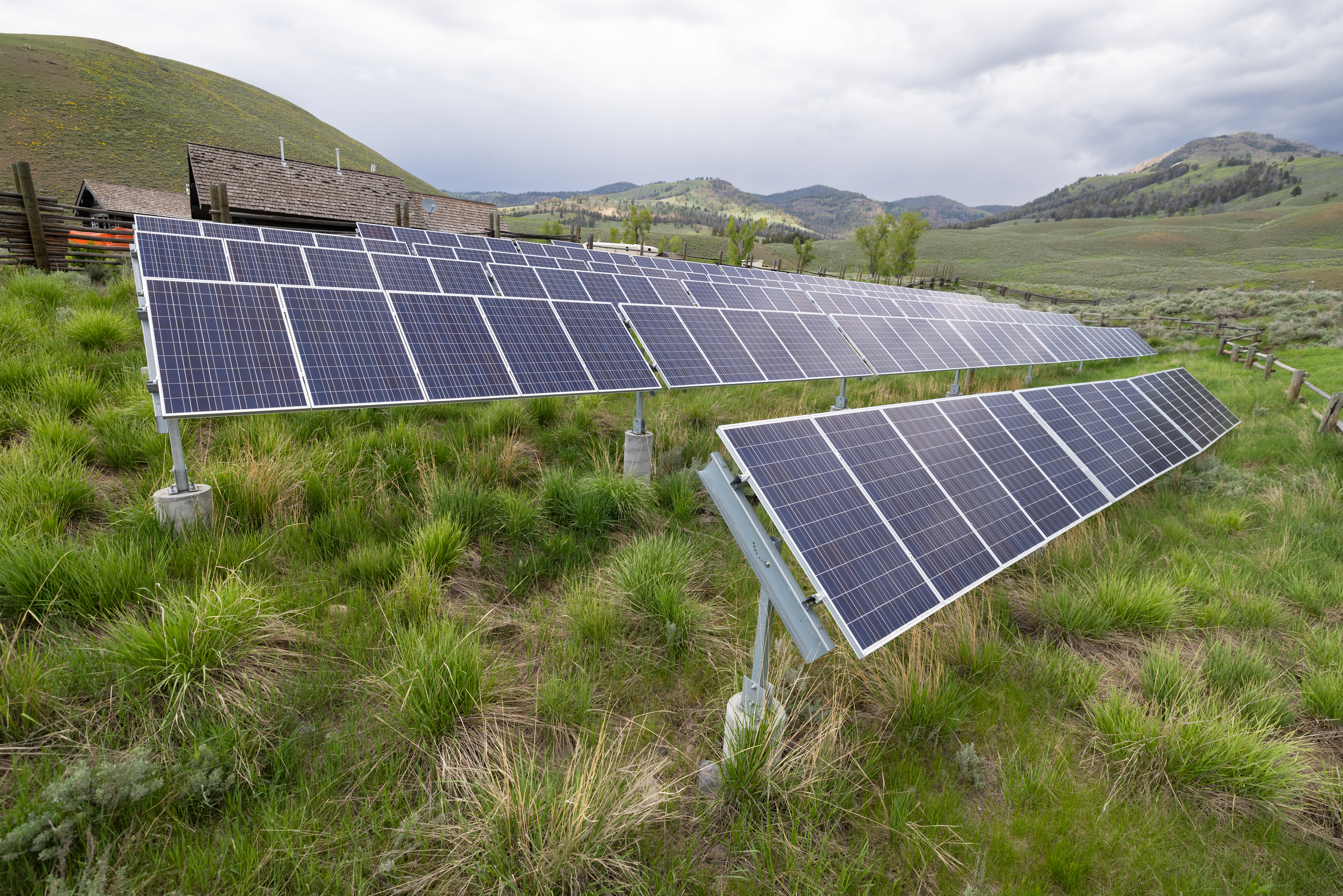
Solar panel system, Lamar Buffalo Ranch

The Wyoming Business Council offers grants for homeowners who want to install photovoltaic (PV) systems . Wyoming's Residential Photovoltaic Grant Program promotes the use of PV by granting half the cost of installing a PV system up to $3,000. The grant program has provided matching grants for 139 residential PV installations, which have a combined rated capacity of 80 kilowatts.

Twenty-five grants were awarded in 2008. Because of the demand for these grants, the program will be using a lottery system to select recipients.

==== Biofuels ====
===== Wyoming potential biofuel production =====
- Gasoline Use: 307 million US gallons (1,160×10^{3} m^{3})
- Diesel Use: 340 million US gallons (1,300×10^{3} m^{3})
- Total Cellulosic Biomass: 0.5 million dry T
- Total Crop Biomass: 0.1 million dry T
- E85 Stations: 5
- Biodiesel Stations: 14
- Ethanol Plants: 1
- Ethanol Production Capacity: 12 million US gallons (45×10^{3} m^{3}).
- Biodiesel Plants: 0
- Biodiesel Production Capacity: 0 million gal

===== Ethanol motor fuel production tax credit =====
Ethanol fuel producers may redeem a tax credit of $0.40 per gallon with the Wyoming Department of Transportation. Ethanol blended motor fuel is defined as a blend of 10% ethanol and 90% gasoline that is used to operate motor vehicles. To be eligible to receive this credit, at least 25% of an ethanol producer's distillation feedstock purchases must be products that originate in Wyoming, excluding water, during the year the tax credits were earned. The total credits redeemed by all ethanol producers may not exceed $4 million per year, and the total credits redeemed by any individual ethanol producer may not exceed $2 million per year.

Additionally, an ethanol producer constructing a new ethanol production facility may receive tax credits for a period not to exceed 15 years after the date that construction is completed. Any ethanol producer that expands its production by at least 25% is eligible for tax credits with an increased maximum amount. Qualifying ethanol producers may only receive a tax credit through June 30, 2009.

=== Energy conservation ===
The Wyoming Energy Conservation Improvement Program (WYECIP) is a performance contracting program for energy conservation in public and private nonprofit facilities. These facilities include state agencies, local governments, schools, colleges, hospitals, nursing homes, and other nonprofit agencies.

The Wyoming Business Council, which also manages the State Energy Program in Wyoming, has prequalified 10 energy service companies under the program and manages the process of implementing performance contracts for the facility owners.

Through performance contracting, participating state and nonprofit agencies can hire the prequalified contractors for energy efficiency upgrades and pay for it with energy savings.

== See also ==
- Almy, Wyoming
- Coal mining
- Coal electricity
- Coal phase out
- Falsifiability
- Plug-in electric vehicles in Wyoming
