= Boreus bomari =

Scientific classification
- Kingdom: Animalia
- Phylum: Arthropoda
- Class: Insecta
- Order: Mecoptera
- Family: Boreidae
- Genus: Boreus
- Species: B. bomari

Binomial name
- Boreus bomari Byers & Shaw, 2000

Species of insect

Boreus bomari is a species of winter scorpionfly in the family Boreidae. The species has been recorded from high-elevation mountainous regions of Wyoming, United States, including areas within the Medicine Bow National Forest and near the Abraham Lincoln Memorial Monument.

== Morphology ==
Adults of Boreus bomari are dark brown to black with a shiny dorsum and sparse setae above the eyes. Body length is approximately 1.3–1.6 times greater than that of Boreus brumalis. Fine black setae occur on the tibiae and tarsi, with very limited setation on the femora, a characteristic that distinguishes B. bomari from other species in the genus.

Male genitalia are sharply tapered, featuring a thumb-like lobe and a row of black spines along the inner margin. Females possess an ovipositor approximately 1.8–1.9 times the length of the rostrum, with long, pointed, fused cerci.

== Behavior and ecology ==
Adults emerge from late fall through winter, when mating and oviposition occur beneath snow cover. Larvae hatch near their primary food source and overwinter within moss substrates. Both larvae and adults feed primarily on mosses and liverworts.

== Taxonomy ==
The species is recognized by major taxonomic and biodiversity databases, including the Integrated Taxonomic Information System, Catalogue of Life, and GBIF.
