= Caurinus dectes =

Scientific classification
- Domain: Eukaryota
- Kingdom: Animalia
- Phylum: Arthropoda
- Class: Insecta
- Order: Mecoptera
- Family: Boreidae
- Genus: Caurinus
- Species: C. dectes

Binomial name
- Caurinus dectes Russell, 1979

Species of insect

Caurinus dectes is a species of snow scorpionfly in the family Boreidae. It is found in North America.
