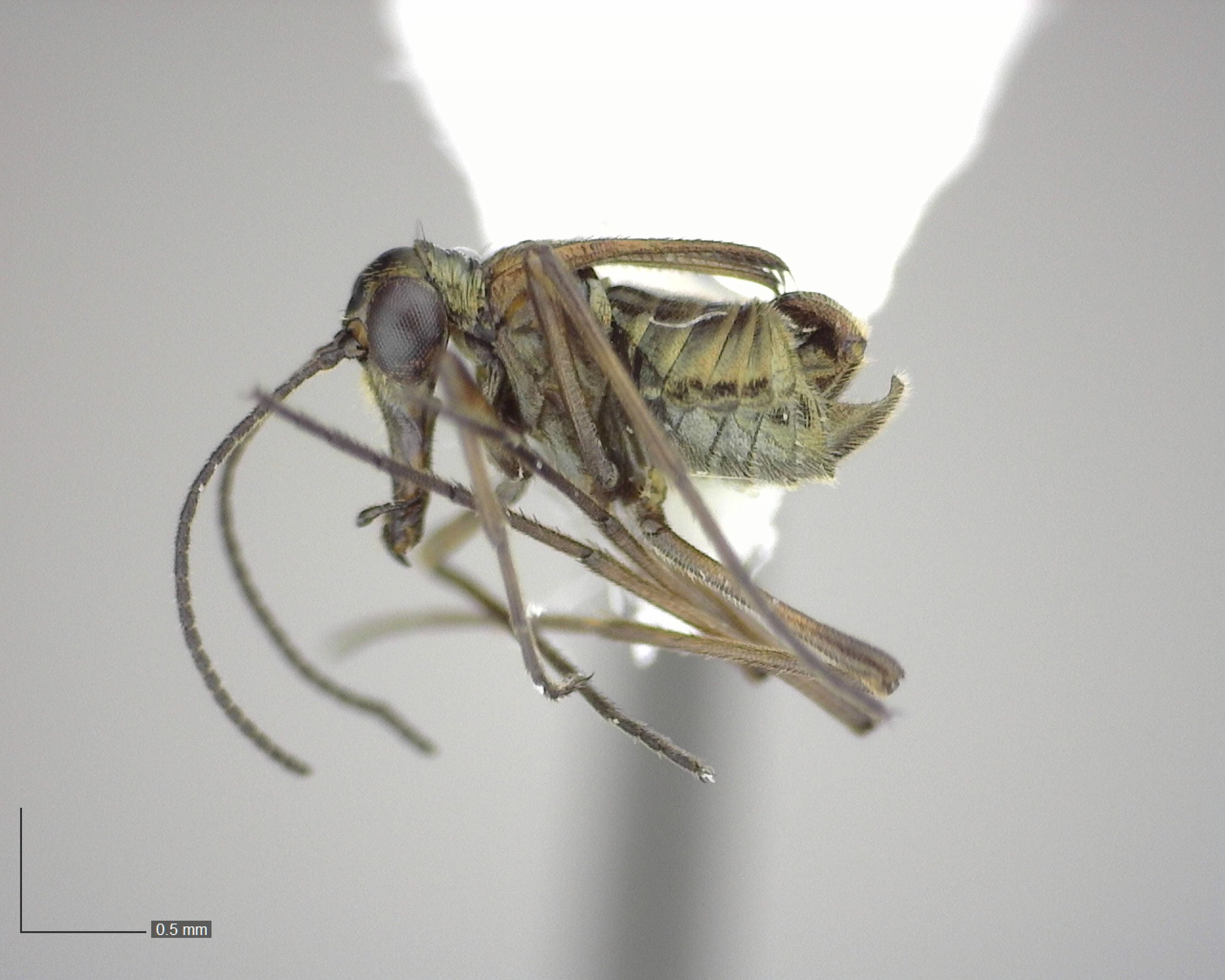

Scientific classification
- Kingdom: Animalia
- Phylum: Arthropoda
- Class: Insecta
- Order: Mecoptera
- Family: Boreidae
- Genus: Boreus
- Species: B. brumalis

Binomial name
- Boreus brumalis Fitch, 1847

= Boreus brumalis =

Species of insect

Boreus brumalis, the mid-winter boreu, is a species of snow scorpionfly in the family Boreidae. It is found in North America.
