= Boreus nivoriundus =

Scientific classification
- Domain: Eukaryota
- Kingdom: Animalia
- Phylum: Arthropoda
- Class: Insecta
- Order: Mecoptera
- Family: Boreidae
- Genus: Boreus
- Species: B. nivoriundus

Binomial name
- Boreus nivoriundus Fitch, 1847

Species of insect

Boreus nivoriundus, known generally as the snow-born boreus or snow scorpionfly, is a species of snow scorpionfly in the family Boreidae. It is found in North America.
