= Boreus coloradensis =

Scientific classification
- Domain: Eukaryota
- Kingdom: Animalia
- Phylum: Arthropoda
- Class: Insecta
- Order: Mecoptera
- Family: Boreidae
- Genus: Boreus
- Species: B. coloradensis

Binomial name
- Boreus coloradensis Byers, 1955

Species of insect

Boreus coloradensis is a species of snow scorpionfly in the family Boreidae. It is found in North America.
