= Boreus nix =

Scientific classification
- Kingdom: Animalia
- Phylum: Arthropoda
- Clade: Pancrustacea
- Class: Insecta
- Order: Mecoptera
- Family: Boreidae
- Genus: Boreus
- Species: B. nix

Binomial name
- Boreus nix Carpenter, 1935

Species of insect

Boreus nix is a species of snow scorpionfly in the family Boreidae. It is found in North America.
