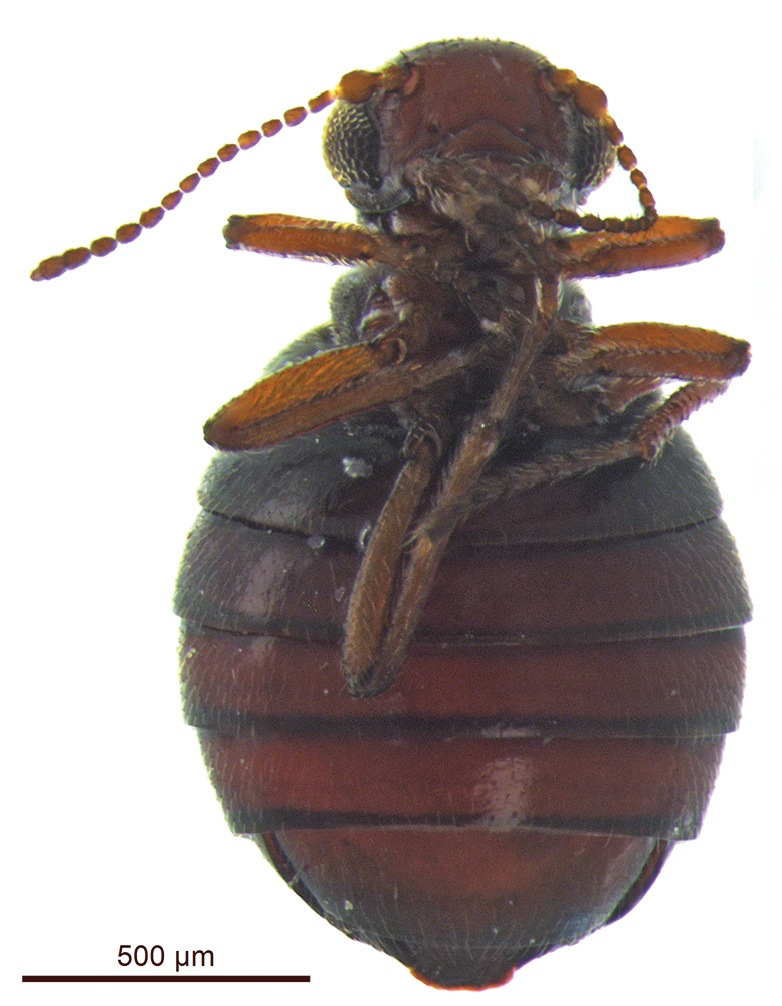
- Female specimen

Scientific classification
- Kingdom: Animalia
- Phylum: Arthropoda
- Class: Insecta
- Order: Mecoptera
- Family: Boreidae
- Genus: Caurinus
- Species: C. tlagu

Binomial name
- Caurinus tlagu Sikes & Stockbridge, 2013

= Caurinus tlagu =

Species of scorpionfly

Caurinus tlagu is a species of scorpionfly in the family Boreidae, a group known as snow scorpionflies. C. tlagu and was first described by Derek Sikes & Jill Stockbridge in 2013 in Prince of Wales Island, Alaska. Its description made it the second accepted member of the genus Caurinus.

== Morphology ==
Visible morphological features of Caurinus tlagu, along with the presence of cytochrome oxidase II gene sequences, help differentiate the species from its sister species C. dectus.

C. tlagu is reddish-brown in hue and measures 1.5 to 2.3 mm (0.06 to 0.09 in) in length. When viewed from the side, it resembles a flea; soft hairs are found sparsely throughout the insect's body, and the insect is covered with sclerites. C tlagu lacks ocelli and the rostrum is either reduced or completely absent.

In C. tlagu, hindwings are lacking, and female forewings resemble pads; male forewings end at the first section of the abdomen. The insect's hairless tarsi have five segments and include tarsal claws. The widest segments of Caurinus tlagu's abdomen are the fourth and fifth segments, and the first two segments are fused. The mandibles contain two teeth, located below the apex.

== Etymology ==
The specific epithet of this scorpionfly, tlagu, is a Tlingit word that roughly translates to "ancient". The insect was named "in honor of the place it occurs, its people, and history, in addition to the apparent great age of the genus Caurinus."

== Ecology and habitat ==
The diet of C. tlagu consists of liverwort found in coastal, forested locations. Instances of the species have been found in open, clearcut spaces, tundra, between trees, and heaths that contain alpine trees.
