= Boreus insulanus =

Scientific classification
- Kingdom: Animalia
- Phylum: Arthropoda
- Clade: Pancrustacea
- Class: Insecta
- Order: Mecoptera
- Family: Boreidae
- Genus: Boreus
- Species: B. insulanus

Binomial name
- Boreus insulanus Blades, 2002

Species of insect

Boreus insulanus is a species of snow scorpionfly in the family Boreidae. It is endemic to Vancouver Island.
