= Chionea valga =

Scientific classification
- Domain: Eukaryota
- Kingdom: Animalia
- Phylum: Arthropoda
- Class: Insecta
- Order: Diptera
- Family: Limoniidae
- Genus: Chionea
- Species: C. valga

Binomial name
- Chionea valga Harris, 1841

Synonyms
- Chionea aspera Walker, 1848; Chionea gracilis Alexander, 1917; Chionea noveboracensis Alexander, 1917; Chionea waughi Curran, 1925

Species of fly

Chionea valga, the snow fly, is a species of limoniid crane fly in the family Limoniidae.
