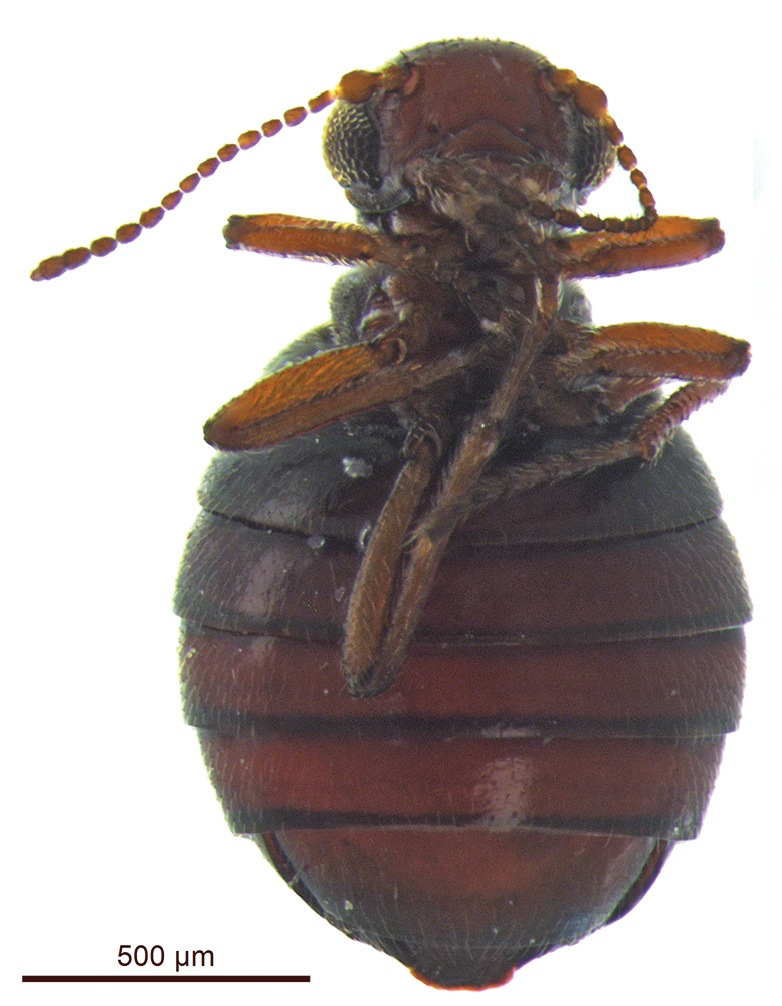
- Caurinus tlagu

Scientific classification
- Kingdom: Animalia
- Phylum: Arthropoda
- Clade: Pancrustacea
- Class: Insecta
- Order: Mecoptera
- Family: Boreidae
- Genus: Caurinus; Russell, 1979

= Caurinus =

Genus of insects

Caurinus is a genus of snow scorpionflies in the family Boreidae found in western North America. There are at least two described species in Caurinus.

== Species ==
These two species belong to the genus Caurinus:

- Caurinus dectes Russell, 1979
- Caurinus tlagu Sikes & Stockbridge, 2013
