= Chionea alexandriana =

Scientific classification
- Domain: Eukaryota
- Kingdom: Animalia
- Phylum: Arthropoda
- Class: Insecta
- Order: Diptera
- Family: Limoniidae
- Genus: Chionea
- Species: C. alexandriana

Binomial name
- Chionea alexandriana Garrett, 1922

Species of fly

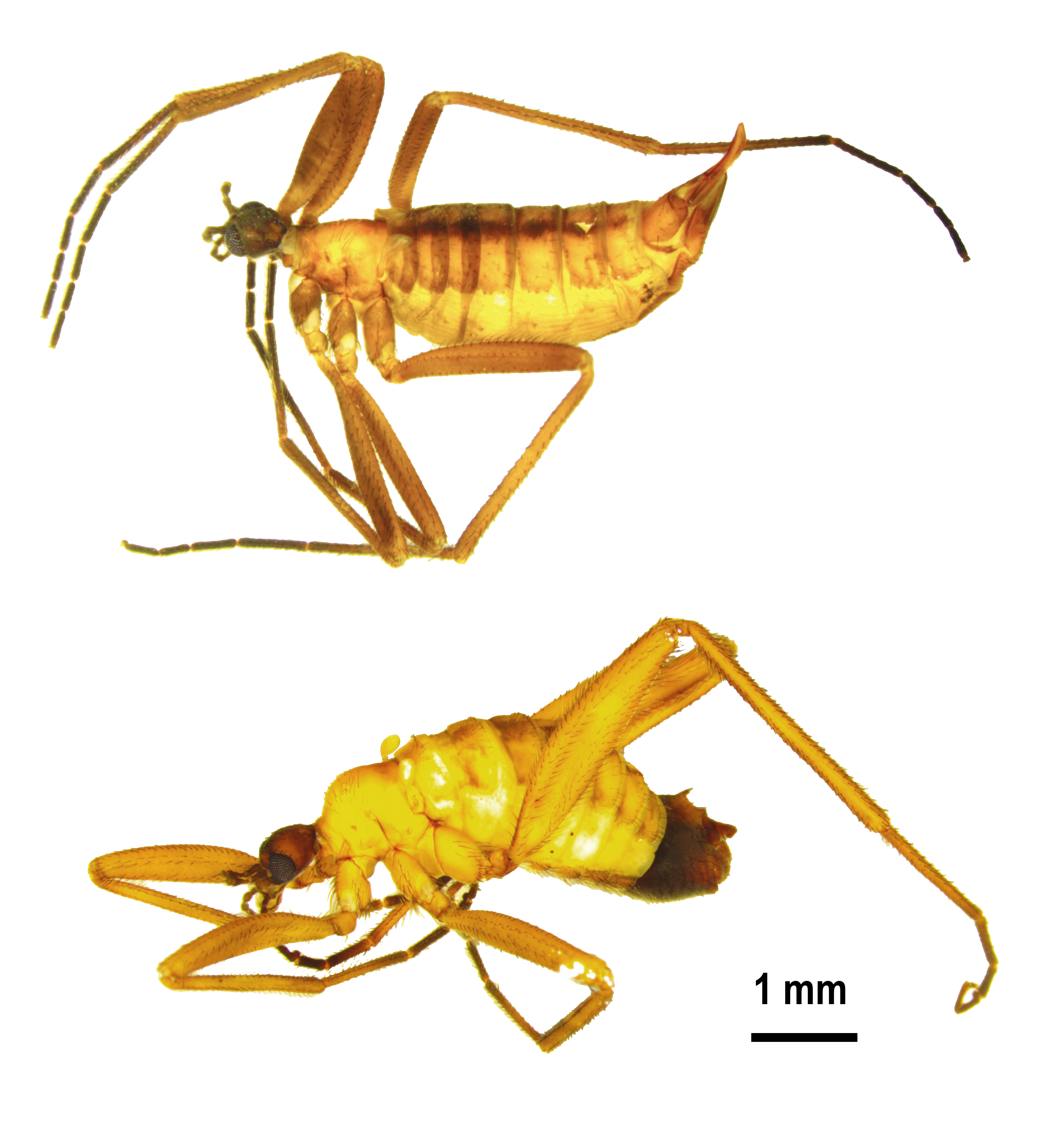
Chionea alexandriana adult female (top) and male (bottom). These are alcohol-preserved specimens from the Cascade mountain range, Washington State USA.

Chionea alexandriana is a species of snow fly (chionea) in the family Limoniidae. The species is common in the western mountains of North America, including Alberta, British Columbia, Washington State, Oregon, Idaho, Montana, Utah, and California. J.A. Chapman (1954), working in Montana, found them to be most abundant in snow fields at 3600-7000 feet elevation from November to April at temperatures ranging from 21-32 degrees F.

Chionea alexandriana adults are 4-8 mm. Based on their morphology and range they are thought to be most closely related to the snow fly species Chionea nigra, jellisoni, excavata and lyrata. They are distinguished from other species by their dark grayish brown heads, light brown to brown bodies, and dorsal midline stripe. Chionea alexandriana antennae are shorter than most other snow fly species, with only three to four flagellomeres.
