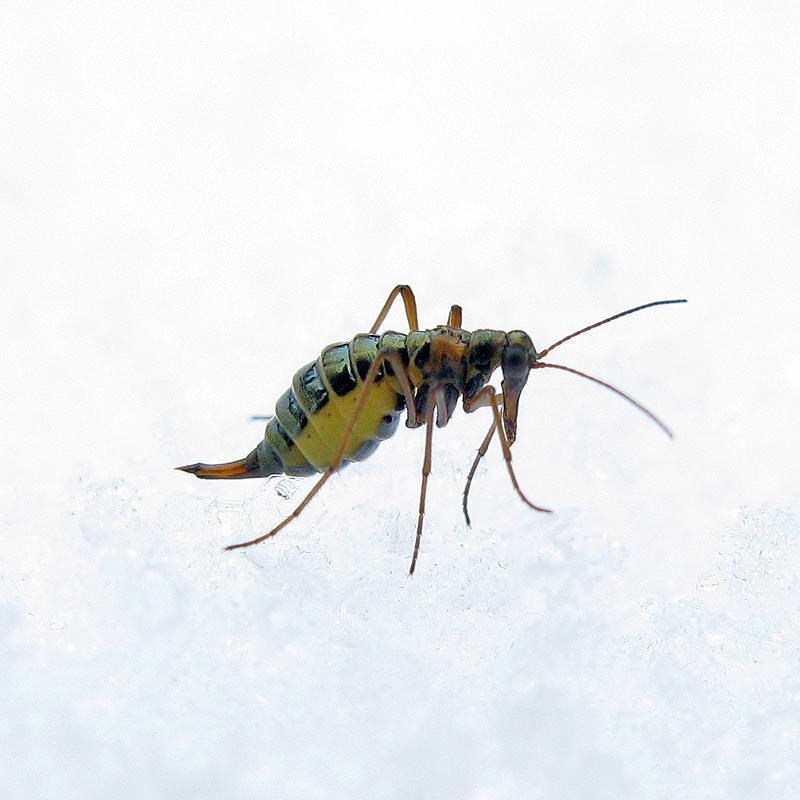
- B. westwoodi female

Scientific classification
- Kingdom: Animalia
- Phylum: Arthropoda
- Clade: Pancrustacea
- Class: Insecta
- Order: Mecoptera
- Family: Boreidae
- Genus: Boreus; Latreille, 1816

= Boreus =

Winter scorpionflies

Genus of insects

Boreus is the most diverse of three genera of insects in the family Boreidae. The type species is the "snow flea" of northern Europe and in North America insects of this genus may be known as "winter scorpionflies": due to their close relation to the true scorpionflies and preference for cold habitats.

== Description and distribution ==
Species of Boreus are dark in color, 3 to 5 mm long, and have reduced, non-functional wings. In males, the wings resemble straps, while in females they are short stubs. Females also have a pointed ovipositor. Both sexes have an elongated head, or rostrum. Larvae are grublike, mostly hairless and lacking prolegs.

They have a holarctic distribution and are found in boreal and high altitude habitats.

== Biology ==
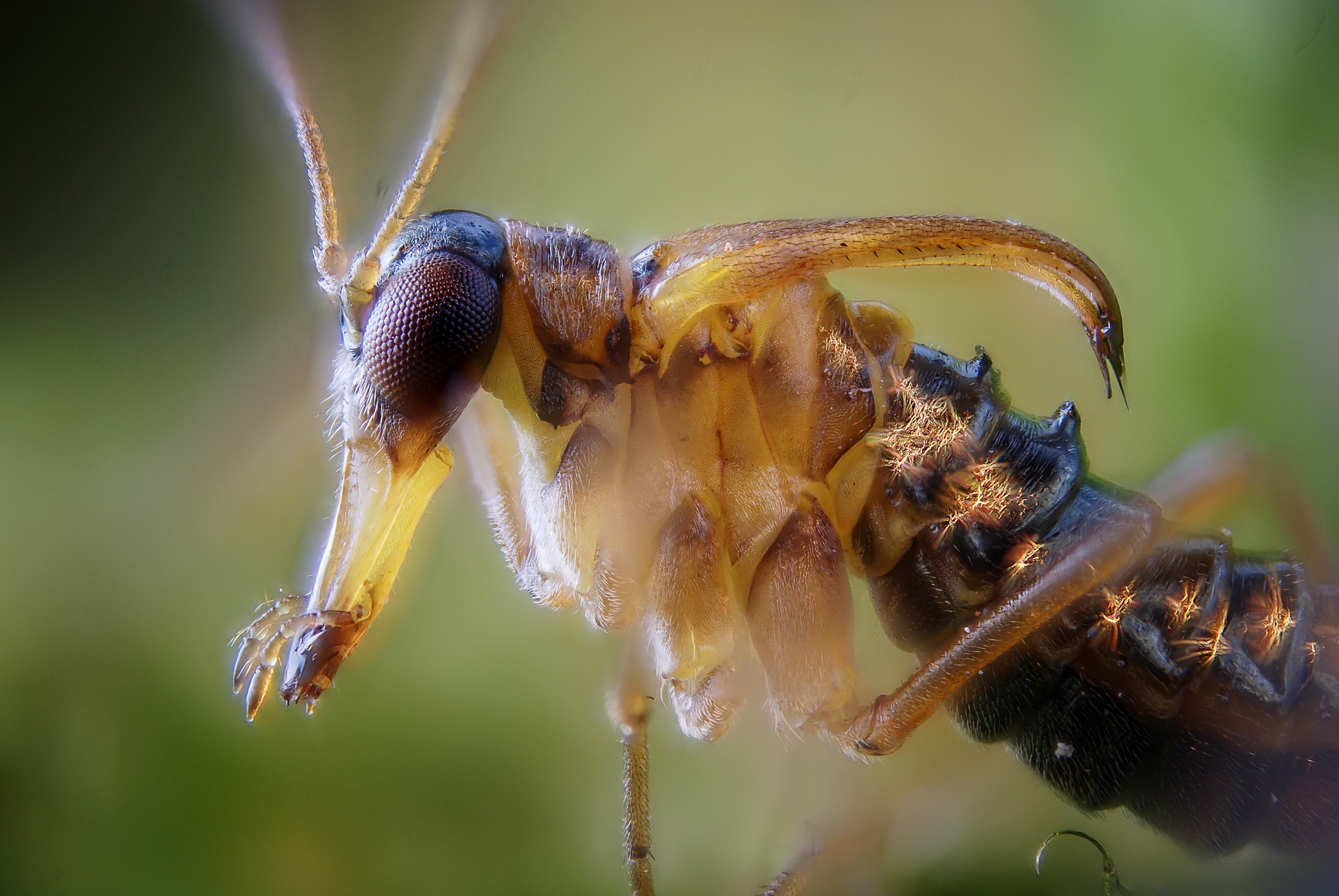
B. hyemalis male

Boreus species are highly adapted to cold environments and often found on the surface of snow. Although they cannot fly, they have the ability to hop or jump. All species are known to feed on mosses, both as adults and larvae. Males use their hardened wing straps to grasp the female and lift her above their backs during mating.

== Species ==
These 27 species belong to the genus Boreus:

- Boreus beybienkoi Tarbinsky, 1962^{i c g}
- Boreus bomari Byers and Shaw, 2000^{i c g}
- Boreus borealis Banks, 1923^{i c g}
- Boreus brumalis Fitch, 1847^{i c g b} (mid-winter boreus)
- Boreus californicus Packard, 1870^{i c g b}
- Boreus chagzhigireji Pliginsky, 1914^{i c g}
- Boreus coloradensis Byers, 1955^{i c g b}
- Boreus elegans Carpenter, 1935^{i c g b}
- Boreus hyemalis (Linnaeus, 1767)^{i c g}
- Boreus insulanus Blades, 2002^{i c g b}
- Boreus intermedius Lloyd, 1934^{i c g}
- Boreus jacutensis Plutenko, 1984^{i c g}
- Boreus jezoensis Hori and Morimoto, 1996^{i c g}
- Boreus kratochvili Mayer, 1938^{i c g}
- Boreus lokayi Klapálek, 1901^{i c g}
- Boreus navasi Pliginsky, 1914^{i c g}
- Boreus nivoriundus Fitch, 1847^{i c g b} (snow-born boreus)
- Boreus nix Carpenter, 1935^{i c g b}
- Boreus orientalis Martynova, 1954^{i c g}
- Boreus pilosus Carpenter, 1935^{i c g}
- Boreus reductus Carpenter, 1933^{i c g}
- Boreus semenovi Pliginsky, 1930^{i c g}
- Boreus sjostedti Navás, 1926^{i c g}
- Boreus tardokijanensis Plutenko, 1985^{i c g}
- Boreus unicolor Hine^{g}
- Boreus vlasovi Martynova, 1954^{i c g}
- Boreus westwoodi Hagen, 1866^{i c g}

Data sources: i = ITIS, c = Catalogue of Life, g = GBIF, b = Bugguide.net
