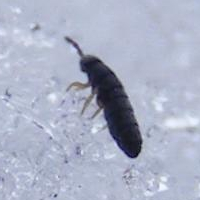

Scientific classification
- Kingdom: Animalia
- Phylum: Arthropoda
- Clade: Pancrustacea
- Class: Collembola
- Order: Poduromorpha
- Family: Hypogastruridae
- Genus: Hypogastrura
- Species: H. nivicola

Binomial name
- Hypogastrura nivicola (Fitch, 1846)

= Hypogastrura nivicola =

Species of springtail

Hypogastrura nivicola is a species of dark blue springtail. Its English name in the United States is snow flea, but there are also additional springtail species (as well as insects) known by that name. They are unrelated to the more commonly known flea.

They are often seen in large clusters on the surface of snow on warm winter days in North America. They are about 1/16 inch long. They have short antennae and two eye clusters with 16 eyes each.

Tight knit colonies have been observed to migrate unidirectionally across the forest floor during spring and autumn days, delicately maneuvering around obstacles such as tree stumps, and dispersing locally at nightfall. Migrations by a single colony have been recorded as far as 25 meters. The reason for this behavior is currently not clear.

Researchers at Queen's University (Canada) have sequenced and synthesised the anti-freeze-like protein that allows H. nivicola to operate in sub-zero environments, and found it to be glycine-rich. There are hopes that similar proteins may be useful for storing transplant organs and for producing better ice cream. Unlike proteins with similar functions in other species, the protein found in H. nivicola breaks down easily at higher temperatures.

In addition to the furcula used for propelling springtails, minuscule sac-like organs project from the hind gut just prior to jumping. These organs are speculated to aid in the action of jumping, either to protect internal organs or dispersal of pheromones but further research is needed.

== See also ==
- Snow scorpionfly - a group of insects (Boreidae) also known as snow fleas, including:
  - Boreus hyemalis
