= Chionea scita =

Scientific classification
- Kingdom: Animalia
- Phylum: Arthropoda
- Class: Insecta
- Order: Diptera
- Family: Limoniidae
- Genus: Chionea
- Species: C. scita

Binomial name
- Chionea scita Walker, 1848

Synonyms
- Chionea primitiva Alexander, 1917

Species of fly

Chionea scita is a species of crane fly in the family Limoniidae. C. scita is known as a type of snow crane fly because it is commonly seen walking on piles of snow during the winter months. These flies are also often observed in caves and heavily wooded areas. C. scita flies are small, hairy, wingless, and somewhat spider-like in appearance, unlike other flies.

Both sexes are yellow-brown in color and are similar in size; however, sexual dimorphism is observed with respect to elements of external genitalia as well as femora length. C. scita are native to North America and are commonly seen in the northeast United States, as well as parts of Canada. The adults emerge during the winter months and can live for multiple months before their life cycle ends.

== Naming origin ==
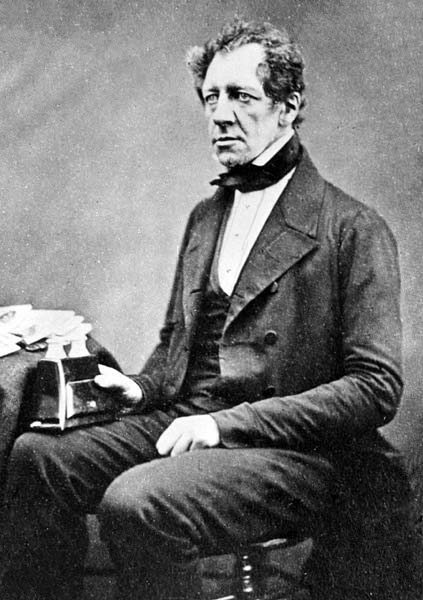
Francis Walker identified and named Chionea scita in 1848.

C. scita was first identified and named as such by English entomologist Francis Walker in 1848. The genus Chionea comes from the Greek word "chion" meaning snow. This is relevant because Chionea flies are very commonly seen walking along snow. The species name scita is Latin for beautiful or handsome.

== Physical description ==
C. scita adults are yellow-brown in color with long, thin bodies and prolonged delicate legs. They differ from other species of flies in that both sexes of adults are wingless. C. scita are hairy and spider-like in appearance, and both sexes can vary greatly in size, with some males being nearly twice as large as others. They are generally fairly small in size, normally between 5 mm (.197 inches) and 8 mm (.315 inches) in length.

The head is usually slightly darker in color than the abdomen, which contains sclerites that are mottled-brown in color. Both antennae are normally made up of around 12 segments, sometimes 9 or 13. The antennae are covered in short, delicate hairs.

=== Male ===
Male C. scita have a thin aedeagus, a male sex organ that secretes sperm, that projects posteriorly. The gonapophyses, organs in the anal region that aid in copulation, project vertically and are shank-like. There is a small space in between the two gonapophyses. The penis is uniformly curved, with a sclerotized section of the ventral side. Males have enlarged femora, whereas females do not.

=== Female ===
Females have three spermathecae, which are receptacles in which sperm is stored after mating. Female cerci are light brown, uniformly curved and are less elongated compared to other species of Chionea. The female has a genital furca with two extending arms which deviate from the basal plate and eventually curve to join the 9th sternum.

== Distribution ==
=== Geographic ===
C. scita are common throughout the continental United States as well as Canada. They have been identified as far south as Georgia and Tennessee. They are primarily located in colder regions, where snow is present in the winter.

=== Seasonal ===
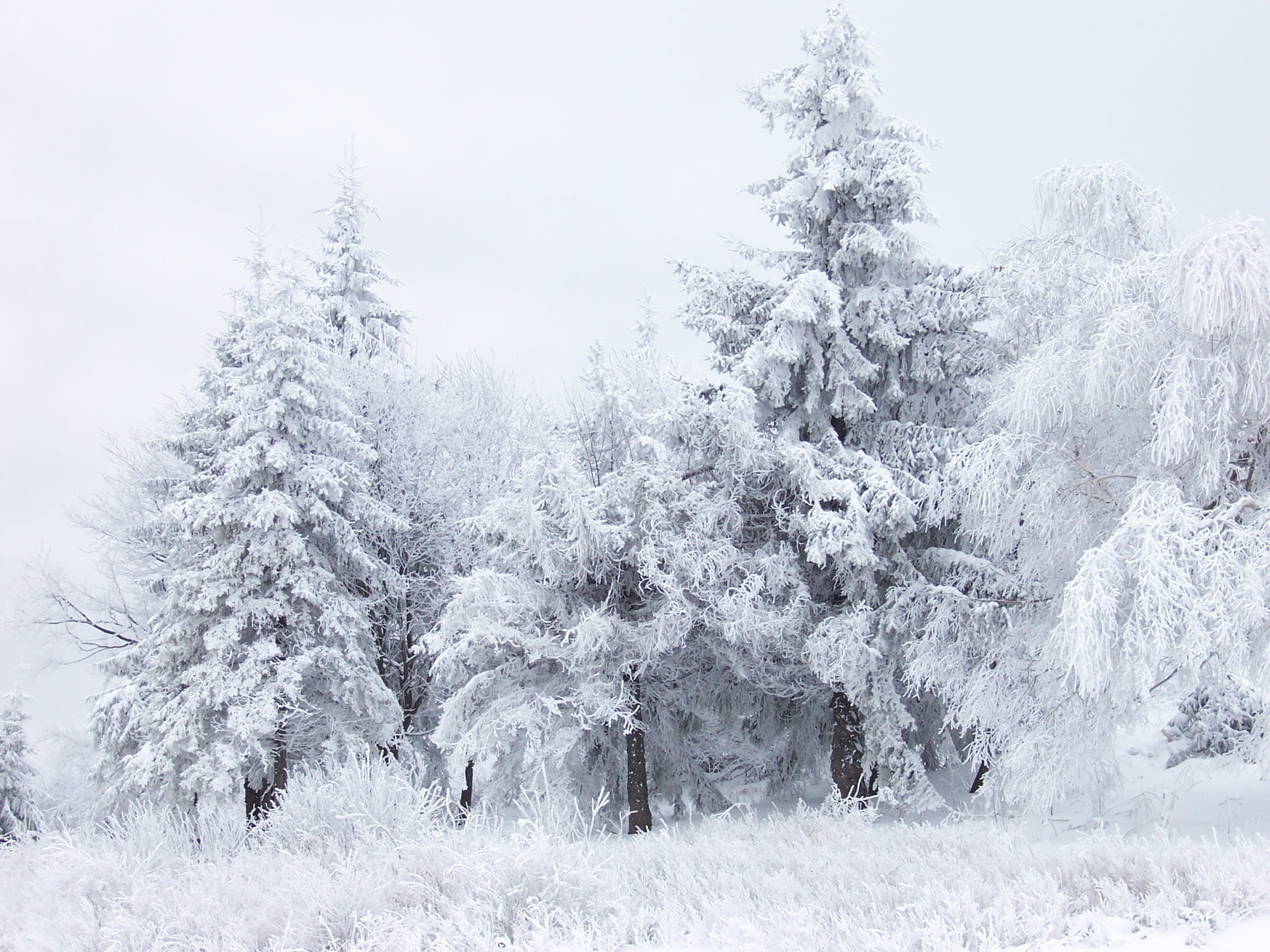
Example of snowy region

In general, only one generation of adults emerges per year, with adults emerging between the months of September and February. Most adult samples have been collected in the months of November and December; however, in the northernmost territory, C. scita have been seen as early as September, and in the southernmost territory, they have been seen to emerge as late as February.

== Habitat ==
While most snow crane flies are often found on the surface of snow, C. scita have been found in various other environments such as lightly wooded forests and inside caves. C. scita have been found deep in caves, far from any exit, suggesting that they can live at least semi-permanently in this environment. There may be an association between the nesting sites of small mammals and the appearance of C. scita but this connection requires further study.

== Life history ==
More research is needed to elaborate on the life cycle of C. scita. However, it is known that females generally lay their eggs in the late winter/early spring months, after a fresh snow, and that the larvae emerge in the spring. Adults emerge in the fall/early winter and can survive for a fairly extended period. It may take several months for adults to mate, reproduce, and then reach the end of their life cycle.

== Mating ==
Matings often occur on piles of snow or dead plant material. Males appeared to have external genitalia that comes into contact with the ovipositor of females. While males varied widely in overall body size, male genitalia were relatively similar in size despite overall size difference. This implies that during their seemingly random search for mates, males do not have to differentiate females based on their overall size.

=== Male ===
C. scita males have a uniformly curved penis with a sclerotized region located on the ventral side. This external genitalia comes into direct contact with the female genitalia during mating. More research is needed on the exact mechanics of the C. scita mating ritual.

=== Female ===
C. scita females have three separate spermathecae chambers, which are structures found in many Dipterans that store sperm after copulation has occurred. Flies with spermathecae often differentially allocate the sperm to fertilize eggs after mating.

== Parental care ==
=== Oviposition ===
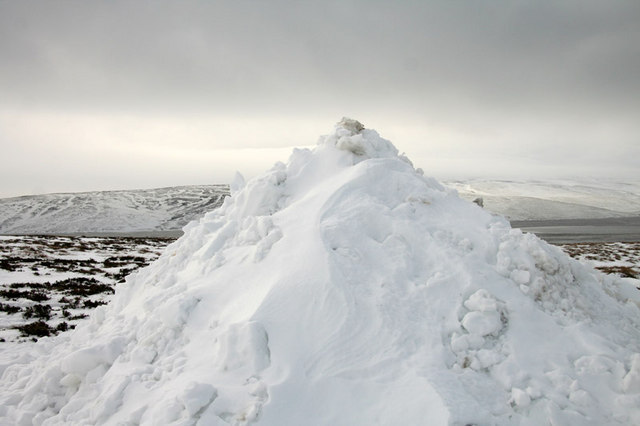
C. scita can often be seen in association with piles of snow

Fly wings require bulky muscles in the abdomen in order to support them. Since adult C. scita are wingless, they also lack these bulky muscle structures, which allows females to carry many eggs at a time. Little research has been done on the process of oviposition in C. scita, however females generally lay eggs after they emerge in the winter months, usually after a snow fall when temperatures are between 28 °F and 38 °F.

== Interactions with snow ==
Snow crane flies, such as C. scita, are relatively unique in that they are one of the few Dipterans that emerge during the winter months and are viewed slowly walking across patches of snow. They have been seen to exhibit these behaviors in temperatures as low as 14 °F. It has been suggested that the snow piles may act as a site for mating, but more research must be done to substantiate these claims.
