= Chionea obtusa =

Scientific classification
- Domain: Eukaryota
- Kingdom: Animalia
- Phylum: Arthropoda
- Class: Insecta
- Order: Diptera
- Family: Limoniidae
- Genus: Chionea
- Species: C. obtusa

Binomial name
- Chionea obtusa Byers

Species of fly

Chionea obtusa is a species of limoniid crane fly in the family Limoniidae.
