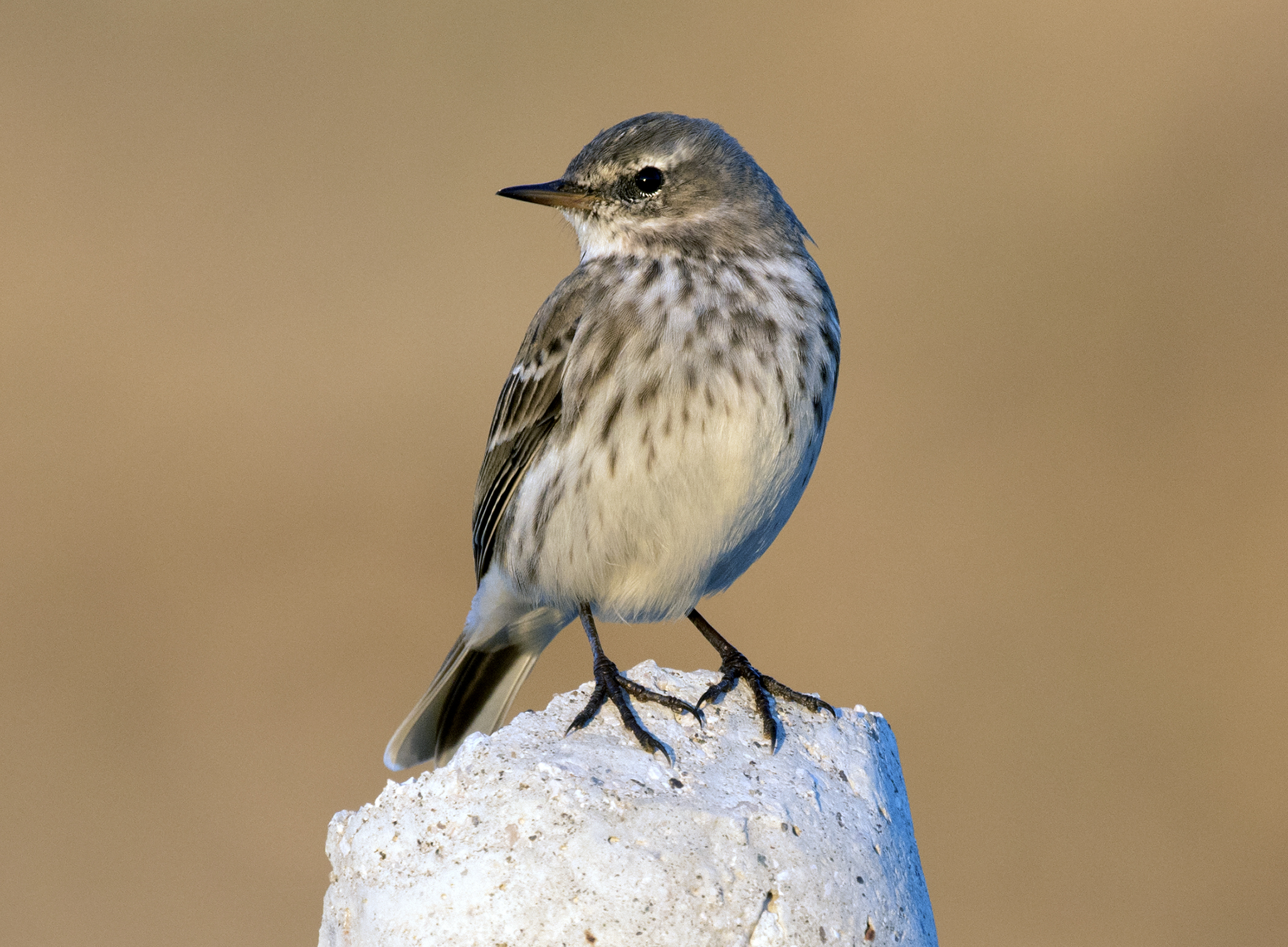
- Anthus spinoletta spinoletta

Conservation status
- Least Concern (IUCN 3.1)

Scientific classification
- Kingdom: Animalia
- Phylum: Chordata
- Class: Aves
- Order: Passeriformes
- Family: Motacillidae
- Genus: Anthus
- Species: A. spinoletta

Binomial name
- Anthus spinoletta (Linnaeus, 1758)
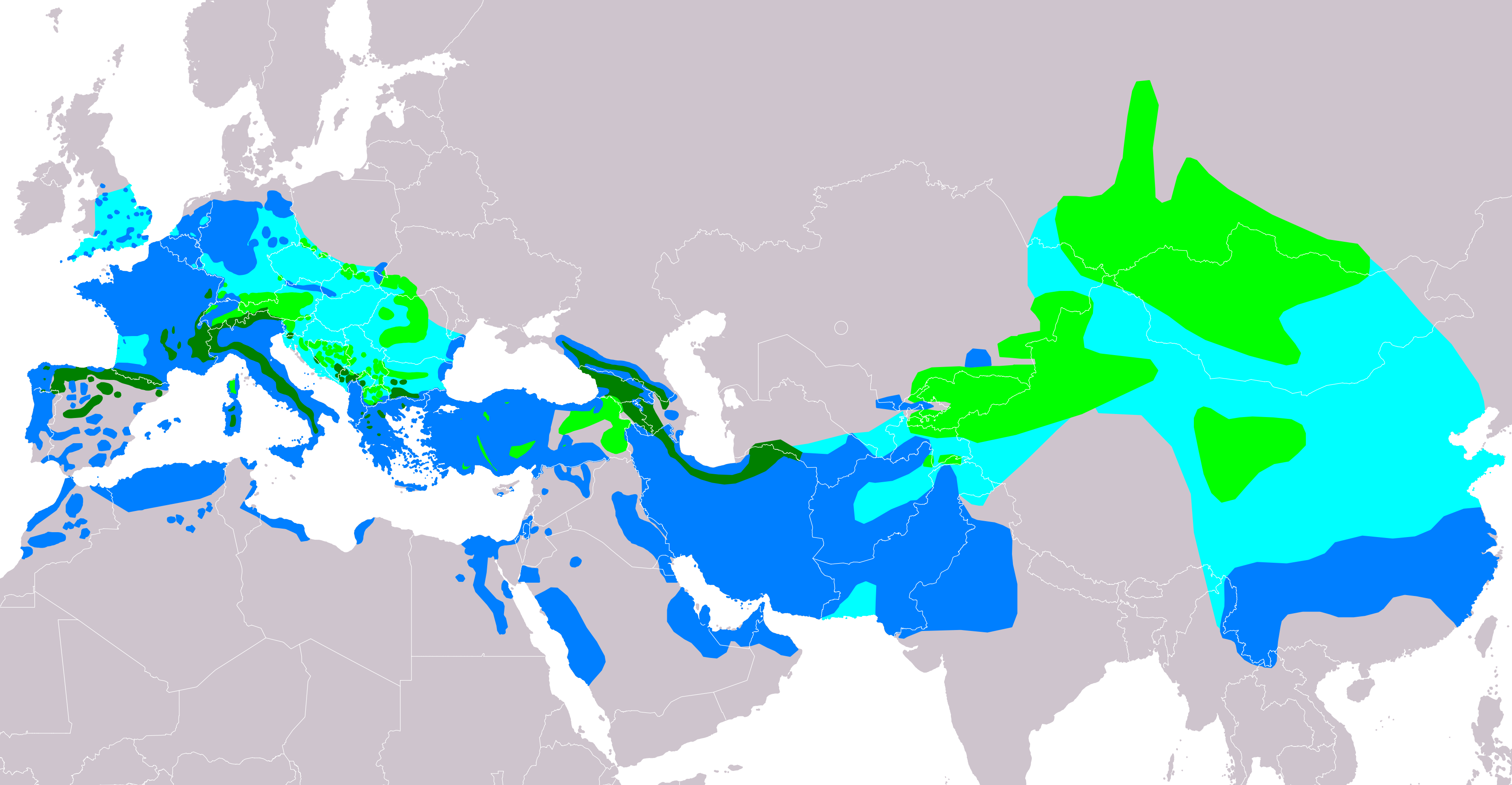
- Range of A. spinoletta Breeding Resident Passage Non-breeding

Synonyms
- Alauda spinoletta Linnaeus, 1758

= Water pipit =

Species of passerine bird

The water pipit (Anthus spinoletta) is a small passerine bird which breeds in the mountains of Southern Europe and the Palearctic eastwards to China. It is a short-distance migrant; many birds move to lower altitudes or wet open lowlands in winter.

The water pipit in breeding plumage has greyish-brown upperparts, weakly streaked with darker brown, and pale pink-buff underparts fading to whitish on the lower belly. The head is grey with a broad white supercilium ("eyebrow"), and the outer tail feathers are white. In winter, the head is grey-brown, the supercilium is duller, the upperparts are more streaked, and the underparts are white, streaked lightly with brown on the breast and flanks. There are only minor differences among the three subspecies, the sexes are almost identical, and young birds resemble adults. The water pipit's song is delivered from a perch or in flight, and consists of four or five blocks, each consisting of about six repetitions of a different short note.

Water pipits construct a cup-like nest on the ground under vegetation or in cliff crevices and lay four to six speckled grey-ish white eggs, which hatch in about two weeks with a further 14–15 days to fledging. Although pipits occasionally catch insects in flight, they feed mainly on small invertebrates picked off the ground or vegetation, and also some plant material.

The water pipit may be hunted by birds of prey, infested by parasites such as fleas, or act as an involuntary host to the common cuckoo, but overall its population is large and stable, and it is therefore evaluated as a species of least concern by the International Union for Conservation of Nature (IUCN).

== Taxonomy and systematics ==
The family Motacillidae consists of the wagtails, pipits and longclaws. The largest of the three groups is the pipits, genus Anthus, which are typically brown-plumaged terrestrial insectivores. Their similar appearances have led to taxonomic problems; the water pipit and the buff-bellied pipit were both formerly considered subspecies of the European rock pipit. Of these, the rock pipit is the more closely related to the water pipit, based on external and molecular characteristics. Other near relatives are the meadow, red-throated and rosy pipits.

The water pipit was first described by Carl Linnaeus in the tenth edition of his Systema Naturae in 1758 as Alauda spinoletta (characterised as A. rectricibus fuscis : extimis duabus oblique dimidiato-albis). The current genus Anthus was created for the pipits by German naturalist Johann Matthäus Bechstein in 1805. Anthus is the Latin name for a small bird of grasslands, and the specific spinoletta is a local dialect word for a pipit from the Florence area of Italy.

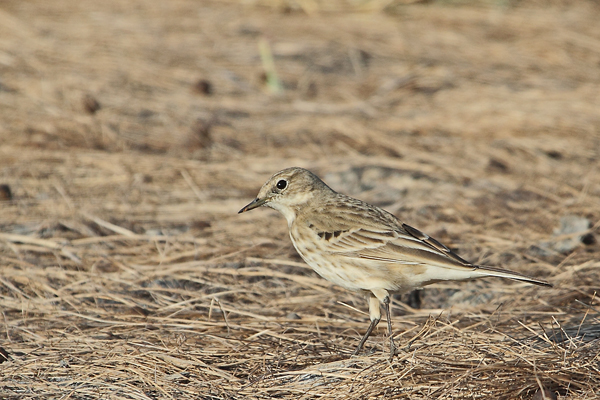
Wintering Anthus spinoletta blakistoni at Tal Chhapar Sanctuary

There are three recognised subspecies of the water pipit:

- Anthus spinoletta spinoletta, (Linnaeus, 1758), (Note: The parentheses show that the current genus name differs from that given originally) the nominate subspecies, breeds in the mountains of southern Europe from the Pyrenees eastwards to northwestern Turkey, and on Sardinia and Corsica.
- Anthus spinoletta coutellii, Audouin, 1828, breeds in the mountains of Turkey other than the northwest, the Caucasus, northern Iran and Turkmenistan.
- Anthus spinoletta blakistoni, R. Swinhoe, 1863, breeds in mountains across Asia from southern Russia east to central China.

A possible fourth race from the northwestern Caucasus, Anthus spinoletta caucasicus, cannot be reliably separated from A.s. coutellii. The latter form is itself a potential new species, based on genetic data, appearance and a characteristic flight call.

== Description ==
The water pipit is 15–17 centimetres (5.9–6.7 in) long and weighs 18.7–23 grams (0.66–0.81 oz). The adult of the nominate race in spring plumage has greyish-brown upperparts, weakly streaked with darker brown, and pale pink-buff underparts fading to whitish on the lower belly. There may be some faint streaking on the breast and flanks. The head is grey with a broad white supercilium. The outer tail feathers are white, and the legs, bill and iris are dark brown or blackish. In non-breeding plumage, the head is grey-brown and the supercilium is less distinct. The upperparts are more streaked, and the underparts are white, marked lightly with brown on the breast and flanks.

The sexes are similar although the female has, on average, a greyer head. Young birds resembles the non-breeding adult, but are browner and more streaked above with prominent streaking on the underparts. A. s. coutellii is smaller than the nominate subspecies and the white of the outer tail feathers has a hint of grey. It is paler and more heavily streaked above, and in summer plumage the underparts' colour covers a larger area and has a rusty tint. A. s. blakistoni is large, pale and less strongly streaked.

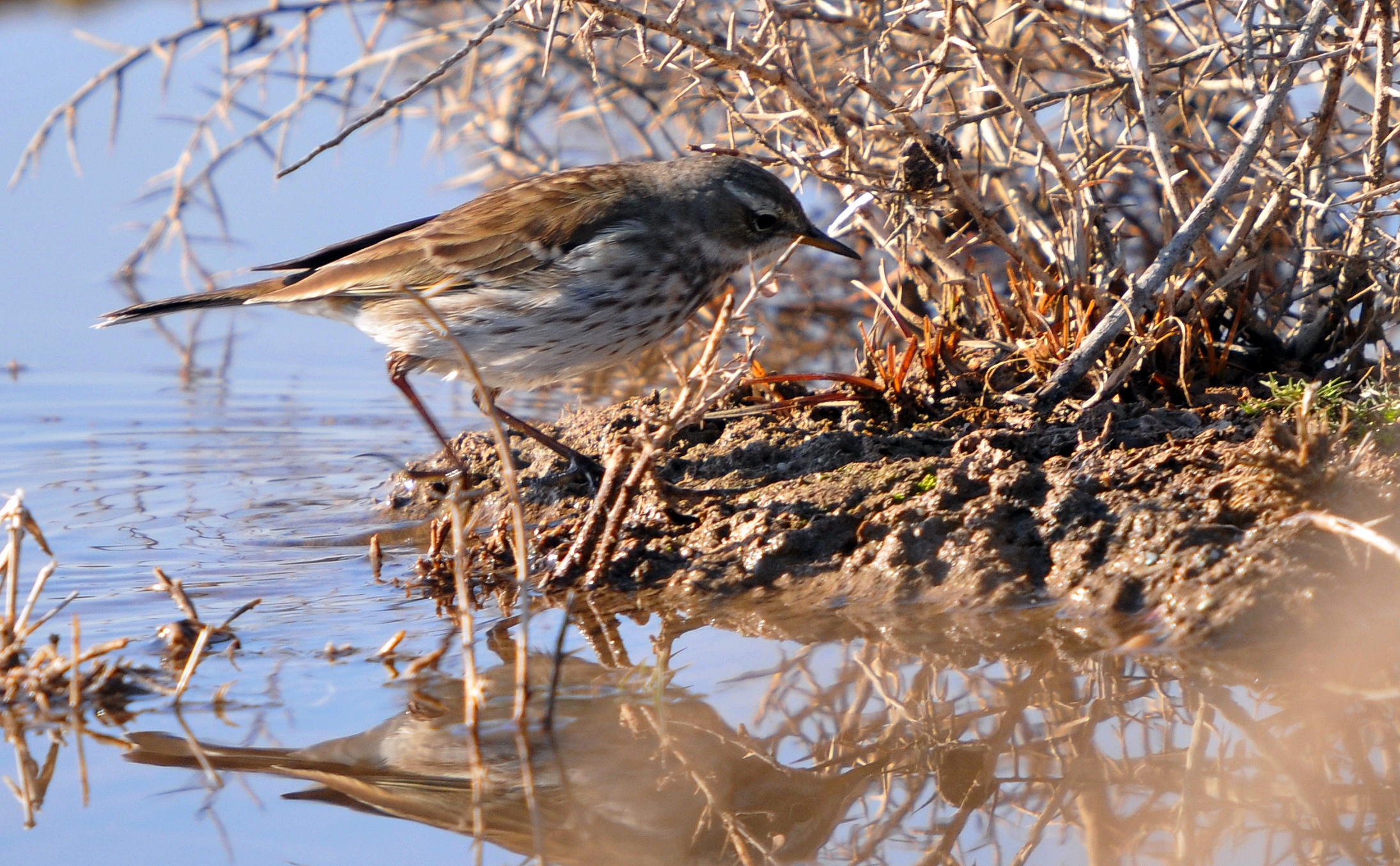
Conspicuous head markings

The water pipit has a complete moult between July and September, although there is considerable individual variation in timing. There is a partial pre-breeding moult, mainly between January and March, but with much variability in timing. This moult typically involves replacing the head, body and some wing feathers, but the extent is again variable. Very occasionally, females may moult into what looks like non-breeding plumage, rather than the expected brighter garb. The chicks start to gain juvenile plumage as soon as a month after hatching, and most have completed the transition to near-adult appearance by September. The first pre-breeding moult is similar to that of the adult, but may be less complete or even absent.

The water pipit is closely related to the Eurasian rock pipit and the meadow pipit, and is rather similar to both in appearance. Compared to the meadow pipit, the water pipit is longer-winged and longer-tailed than its relative, and has much paler underparts. It has dark, rather than pinkish-red, legs. The water pipit in winter plumage is also confusable with the Eurasian rock pipit, but has a strong supercilium, greyer upperparts, and white, not grey, outer tail feathers; it is also typically much warier. The habitats used by European rock and water pipits are completely separate in the breeding season, and there is little overlap even when birds are not nesting. There is also little mixing with breeding meadow pipits, although since 1960 some overlapping territories have been found where the species coexist.

The European rock pipit's subspecies Anthus petrosus littoralis in summer plumage is particularly close in outward appearance to the water pipit. The rock pipit normally has a bluer tint to the head, streaking on the breast and flanks, and buff outer tail feathers, and the songs are also different. The species mostly occupy different habitat types even when they occur in the same general area.

=== Voice ===
The water pipit's song is delivered from a perch or in flight, and consists of four or five blocks, each consisting of about half a dozen repetitions of a different short note. In comparison, the European rock pipit's song is a sequence of about twenty tinkling cheepa notes followed by a rising series of thin gee calls, and finishing with a short trill. The call of the water pipit is a single or double sharp "dzip" or similar, slightly harsher than soft sip sip sip of the meadow pipit or the shrill pseep of the European rock pipit. The short, thin fist flight call is intermediate between the sip of the meadow pipit and the rock pipit's feest. The differences between the calls of the pipit species are very subtle, and not diagnostic in the absence of other evidence. The flight call of the subspecies A. s. coutellii is shorter and more buzzing than that of the nominate race.

== Distribution and habitat ==
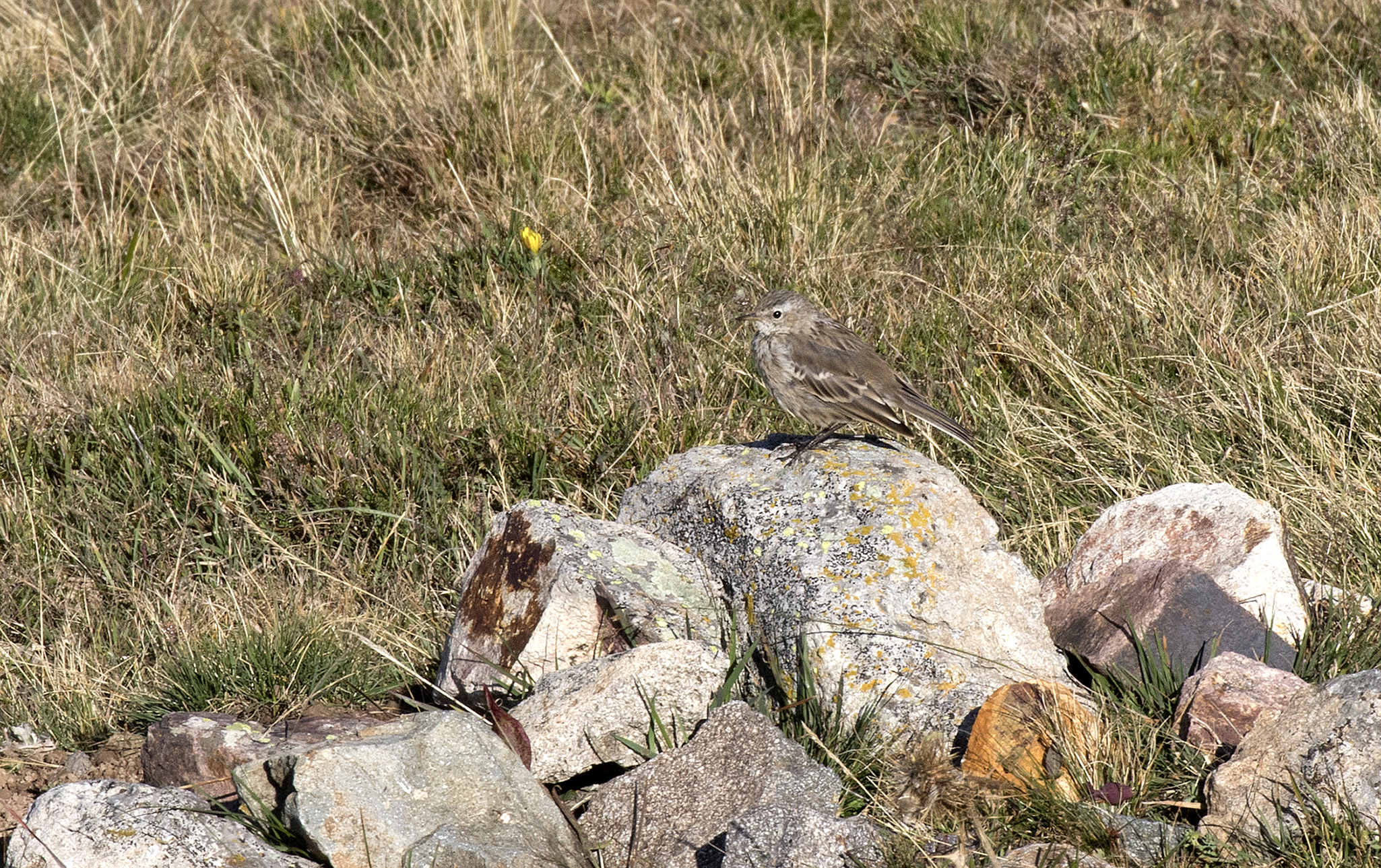
In typical breeding habitat

The breeding range of the water pipit is the mountains of southern Europe and Asia from Spain to central China, along with the Mediterranean islands of Sardinia and Corsica.

The water pipit is predominantly a mountain species in the breeding season, found in alpine pasture and high meadows with short grass and some bushes or rocks. It is typically found close to wetter areas and often on slopes. It breeds between 615–3,200 metres (2,020–10,500 ft) altitude, mostly 1,400–2,500 metres (4,600–8,200 ft). It migrates relatively short distances in autumn to lower ground, typically wintering on coastal wetlands, marshes, rice fields and similar habitats. Although most birds move to lowlands, some may remain at up to 2,000 metres (6,600 ft). Nominate A. s. spinoletta winters mainly in western and southern Europe and in northwestern Africa; in western Europe some birds show fidelity to the same wintering site, returning each year. Birds in Spain appear to move only lower down the mountains in which they breed. A.s. coutellii winters at lower altitudes near its breeding areas and also in the Arabian Peninsula and northeast Africa. A.s. blakistoni winters in Pakistan, northwest India and southern China.

Water pipits leave their breeding sites from mid-September, although the eastern subspecies may start moving south before then. The spring migration starts in February and March, with arrival on the breeding grounds in April and May. The water pipit has been recorded as a vagrant in Belarus, Gibraltar and Latvia, and on islands including the Canaries, Iceland, Malta and Svalbard.

== Behaviour ==
The water pipit is a much less approachable bird as compared to the European rock pipit. It is warier than its relative and if approached it flies some distance before landing again, whereas the rock pipit typically travels only a short distance, close to the ground, before it alights.

=== Breeding ===
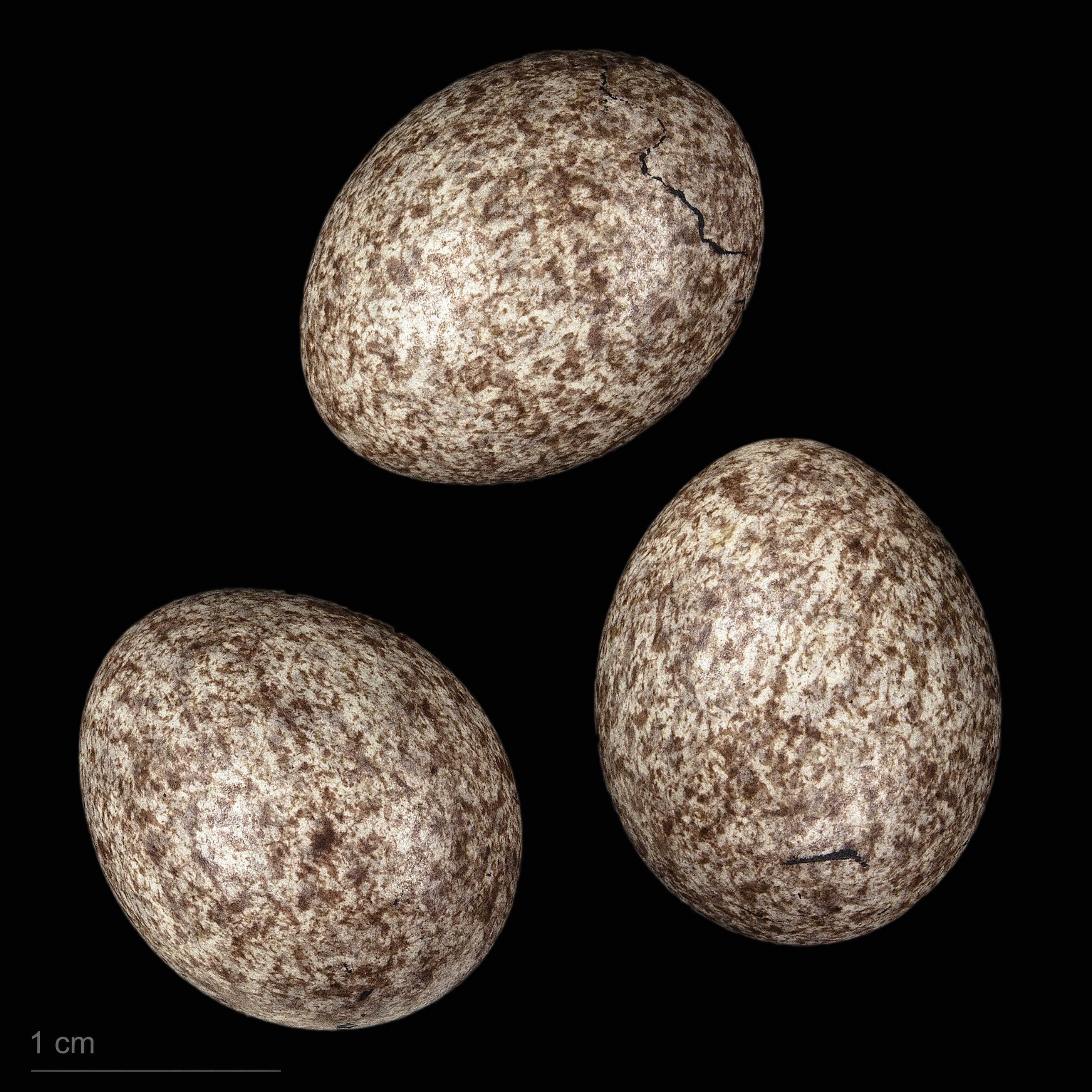
Eggs in the Muséum de Toulouse

The water pipit is mainly monogamous, although both sexes may deviate from this occasionally. The male has a display flight in which he climbs to 10–30 metres (33–98 ft), flies in an arc and glides back down, singing throughout. The female constructs a cup nest from grass and leaves which is lined with finer plant material and animal hairs. The nest is hidden in vegetation on the ground, sometimes in a hollow. The normal clutch is four to six eggs laid from the end of April to early July. Eggs are greyish white with darker grey or brownish speckles mainly at the wider end, and they measure 21 by 16 millimetres (0.83 in × 0.63 in) and weigh 2.7 grams (0.095 oz) of which 5% is shell.

The eggs are incubated by the female for 14–15 days to hatching. Chicks are fed initially by the male, both parents sharing the duty after a few days when the female does not need to brood so often, and they fledge in a further 14–15 days. There may be two broods in a year.

In a Swiss study of the nominate subspecies, 76% of eggs hatched, and 58% of chicks fledged. Birds of the race A. s. blakistoni in the Tian Shan hatched 90% of their eggs, and hatchlings survived to fledging in 47% of the nests. In the latter study, early nests were more likely to fail because less plant cover made them more likely to be found by predators. Neither the average lifespan nor the maximum age of survival are known.

=== Feeding ===
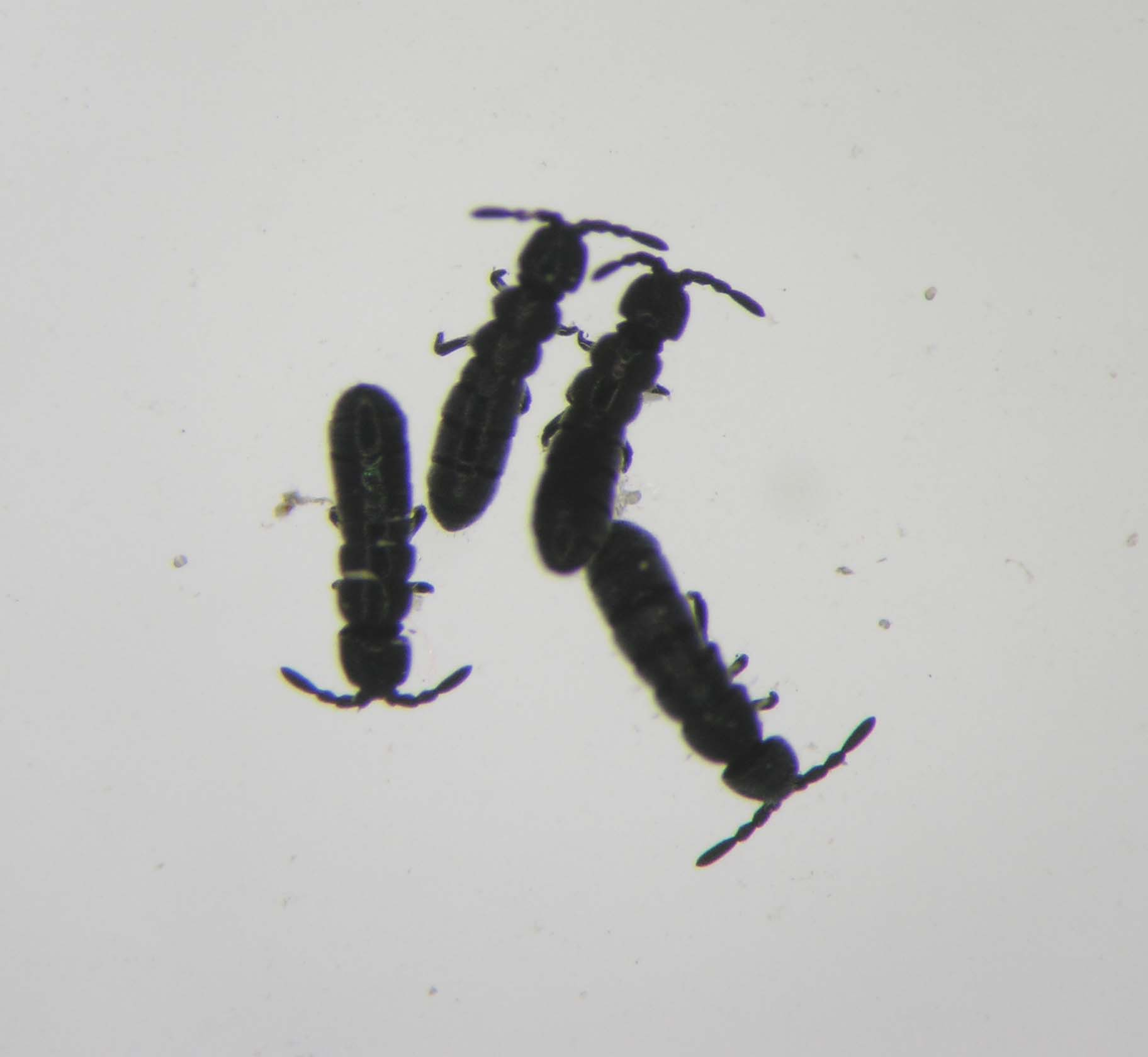
Glacier fleas are a prey item found on snow fields

The water pipit's feeding habitat is damp grassland, rather than the rocky coasts favoured by the Eurasian rock pipit. The water pipit feeds mainly on a wide range of invertebrates, including crickets and grasshoppers, beetles, snails, millipedes and spiders. Barkflies, true flies, caterpillars and homopterans can form a large part of the diet of fledglings. Birds close to snow fields take insects specialised for that habitat such as the springtails Isotoma saltans (the glacier flea) and I. nivalis, and the scorpion fly Boreus izyemalis.

Birds normally forage alone or in pairs; in bad weather, foraging is more frequent and involves longer flights, and may be concentrated around marmot burrow entrances. Prey items average 8.3 millimetres (0.33 in) in length and are mainly hunted on foot, although flying insects are occasionally caught in the air. Some plant material is taken, and one study on the border of Czechoslovakia and Poland found that 75% of the diet by volume consisted of algae, specifically Ulothrix zonata, despite large numbers of insects being available.

In areas with acidic soils, there is less calcium available, potentially leading to thinner egg shells. In such locations, pipits are more likely to select snails and similar prey with calcium-rich shells than is the case in limestone terrain.

== Predators and parasites ==
The water pipit is hunted by birds of prey including Eleonora's falcon, and eggs and young may be taken by terrestrial predators including stoats and snakes. As with other members of its genus, the water pipit is a host of the common cuckoo, a brood parasite. Eggs of cuckoos that specialise in parasitising pipits are similar in appearance to those of their hosts.

A new species of feather mite, Proctophyllodes schwerinensis, was discovered on the water pipit, which is also a host to the fleas Ceratophyllus borealis and Dasypsyllus gallinulae. Along with other Motacillidae species, the water pipit is a host of the protozoan parasite Haemoproteus anthi.

== Status ==
Estimates of the European breeding population of the water pipit vary widely, but may be as high as two million pairs, which would suggest a global population of tens of millions of individuals spread over 3.7 millionsquare kilometres (1.4 millionsq mi). The range is discontinuous due to the mountain habitat this species uses, but the population is considered overall to be large and stable, and for this reason the water pipit is evaluated as a species of least concern by the IUCN.

Breeding densities (in pairs per ten ha) have been recorded as 2.4 in the Jura Mountains, 3.0–3.6 in the Alps and 4.5 in the Tatra Mountains of Poland. (Note: The equivalents in pairs per ten acres are 1.0, 1.2–1.5 and 1.8 respectively)
