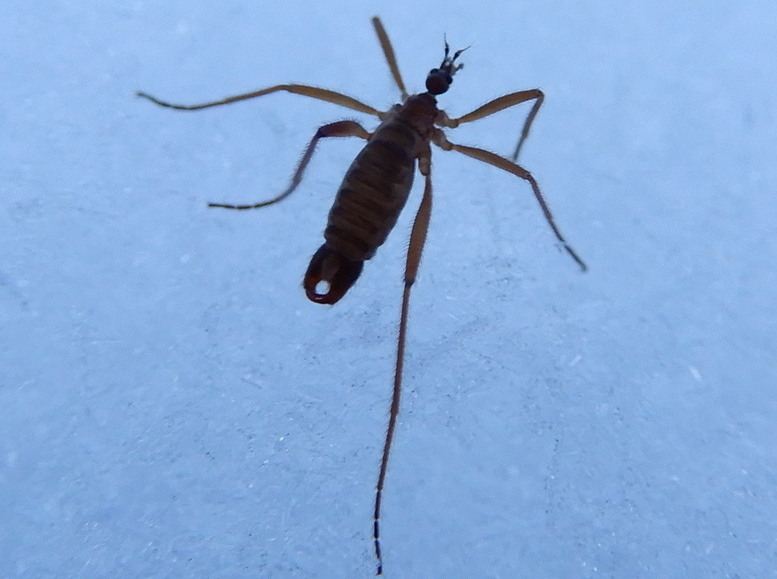
- Chionea lutescens

Scientific classification
- Kingdom: Animalia
- Phylum: Arthropoda
- Class: Insecta
- Order: Diptera
- Family: Limoniidae
- Subfamily: Chioneinae
- Tribe: Cladurini
- Genus: Chionea; Dalman, 1816

Type species
- Chionea araneoides Dalman, 1816

Species
- See text

Diversity
- ca. 40 species

= Chionea =

Genus of flies

Chionea is a genus of wingless limoniid crane flies. It consists of two subgenera, the holarctic Chionea and palaearctic Sphaeconophilus. About 37 species are currently recognized in the northern hemisphere, but there are probably several undescribed species. They are commonly called snow flies.

== Description ==
Snow fly running in the Cascade mountains

Adults are found during the winter season in forested environments, where they can be observed walking across the surface of the snow. Many species live at high elevations, with some examples of C. nigra found in the Rocky Mountains above 3400 m.

Adults seem to actively seek out the coldest place they can find and drink water by pressing their proboscis against the snow (Marchand, 1917). Adults are not known to feed. Adults have a significantly longer lifespan than other crane flies, living as long as two months.

Chionea are highly active in cold environments that are lethal to most insect species. Adults are often found in motion as they move across the surface of the snow, walking at speeds near their peak velocity. They have been observed walking at speeds at up to 0.8 metres (2.6 ft) per minute in sub-zero conditions, and males have been observed to leap when alarmed.

The winglessness of the genus is probably attributable to the fact that at sub-freezing temperatures, it is challenging to generate energy required for maintaining flight. Chionea lack flight musculature, allowing for the storage of additional eggs within the thoracic cavity. However, the halteres have not been reduced and remain innervated. Thus, halteres likely serve as sensory organs for Chionea.

Up to 200 eggs have been found in female snow flies, which are laid singly. The larvae develop in wooded regions, small caves, and rodent burrows. The diet of larvae likely consists of decomposing organic debris, such as decaying leaves, grass stems, and rodent feces found in burrows.

== Cold tolerance ==
As Chionea are adapted to living on snow and in subnivean habitats, they are considered cold tolerant insects. In the wild Chionea are frequently observed at temperatures as cold as 0 and -6°C. In experiments conducted in laboratory environments, Chionea are active and alive until the temperature drops to a mean low of -7°C, their supercooling point. Some individuals, however, have been observed to be active at temperatures as low as -17°C.

The antifreeze agent found in Chionea hemolymph has been determined to be sugar trehalose. They may also produce glycerol in their hemolymph, preventing them from freezing. Additionally, if a snow fly senses frostbite in its leg, it will instantly self-amputate or detach its leg to prolong survival, much like a lizard detaches a tail if it is attacked.

== Reproduction ==
Mating is indiscriminate (probably because it is very hard to find a specimen of the other sex for them) and takes 30 to 70 minutes. Winged crane flies and wingless snow crane flies mate tail to tail and this has been verified with video evidence by Vanessa Logsdon et al.

== Predators ==
One of the reasons why adults emerge in winter seems to be the absence of predators. However, "ice crawlers" (Grylloblattidae) have been shown to feed on them. Because the cysticercoid form of a tapeworm species has been found in two out of three C. stoneana specimens in eastern Kansas, they also have to be eaten by mice, which are the tapeworm's host. The snow fly larvae likely take up these tapeworms via mouse feces.

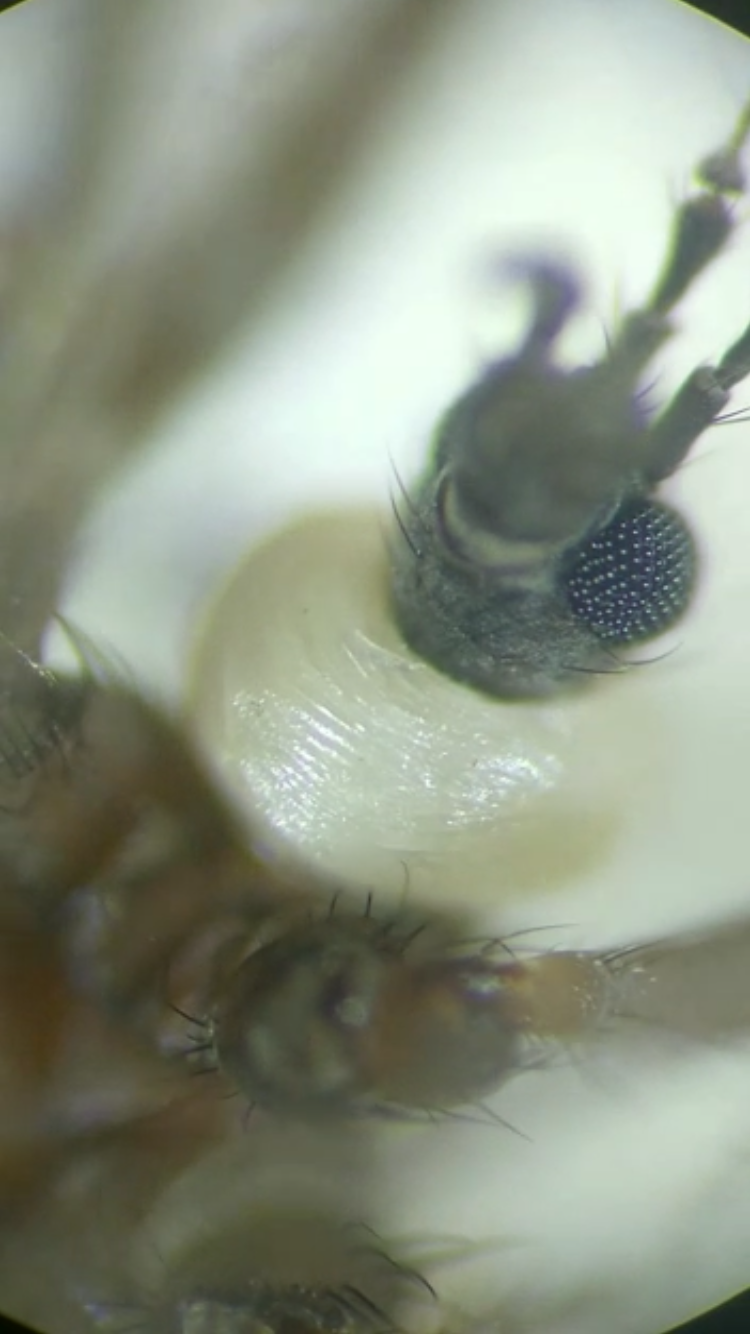
A high magnification dorsal view of a snow fly specimen with a nematode dauer placed around the snow fly's cervix ("neck").

== Parasites ==
Tapeworm cysticercoids, possibly of the genus Hymenolepis, have been found in the abdomens of Chionea stoneana.

While most likely not a parasite of snow flies, a species of nematode, similar to Rhabditis, can sometimes be found in a ringed capsule, which is called a dauer, around the neck of adult snow flies. Immature nematodes develop inside the dauer before ultimately dispersing from it. It has been speculated that the female nematode lays this ring around the fly's neck when it emerges from the pupa and cannot yet move properly. These nematodes are presumed to be phoretic, meaning that they use the snow fly as a mechanism for dispersal, and not snow fly parasites.

== Species ==
This list was adapted from the "Catalogue of the Craneflies of the World (Diptera, Tipuloidea: Pediciidae, Limoniidae, Cylindrotomidae, Tipulidae)". Naturalis Biodiversity Center. (January 2007).

Subgenus Chionea (Holarctic)

- Chionea albertensis Alexander, 1941 (Canada, United States south to Oregon, Idaho)
- Chionea alexandriana Garrett, 1922 (Canada, USA to California, Utah)
- Chionea araneoides Dalman, 1816 (Europe: Sweden to Italy, Romania and Russia)
- Chionea carolus Byers, 1979 (USA: California, Nevada)
- Chionea crassipes Boheman, 1846
  - Chionea crassipes crassipes (Scandinavia, Russia to Japan)
  - Chionea crassipes magadanensis Narchuk, 1998 (Russia: Magadan Oblast)
- Chionea durbini Byers, 1983 (USA: California)
- Chionea excavata Byers, 1983 (USA: California, Nevada)
- Chionea hybrida Byers, 1983 (USA: Idaho, Utah)
- Chionea jellisoni Byers, 1983 (USA: Montana, Idaho, Utah)
- Chionea jenniferae (Byers, 1995) (USA: California)
- Chionea kanenoi Sasakawa, 1986 (Japan: Honshū)
- Chionea lyrata Byers, 1983 (USA: California)
- Chionea macnabeana Alexander, 1947 (Canada, USA to Washington, Oregon)
- Chionea mirabilis Vanin, 2008 (Korea)
- Chionea nigra Byers, 1983 (USA: Utah, Colorado)
- Chionea nipponica Alexander, 1932 (Russia:Primorsky Krai, Japan)
- Chionea nivicola Doane, 1900 (USA: Washington, Oregon, Idaho, Montana)
- Chionea obtusa Byers, 1983 (Canada, USA to Oregon, Idaho)
- Chionea pusilla Savchenko, 1983 (Russia: Primorsky Krai)
- Chionea racovitzai Burghele-Balacesco, 1969 (Romania)
- Chionea reclusa Byers, 1995 (USA: Illinois)
- Chionea scita Walker, 1848 (Canada, USA to Kentucky, Tennessee and Georgia)
- Chionea stoneana Alexander, 1940 (USA: Minnesota to Indiana, south to Kansas, Oklahoma and Missouri)
- Chionea valga Harris, 1841 (Canada, USA south to Minnesota, Wisconsin, Tennessee, North Carolina and Virginia)
- Chionea wilsoni Byers, 1983 (USA: Alabama, Tennessee, North Carolina)

Subgenus Sphaeconophilus (Palaearctic)

- Chionea alpina Bezzi, 1908 (Europe: France to Spain, Germany to Montenegro)
- Chionea ancae (Menier and Matile, 1976) (France)
- Chionea arverna (Brunhes, 1986) (France: Massif Central)
- Chionea austriaca (Christian, 1980) (Austria)
- Chionea belgica (Becker, 1912) (Europe: Belgium, Denmark, Germany, Hungary, Netherlands, Switzerland)
- Chionea besucheti (Bourne, 1979) (Switzerland)
- Chionea botosaneanui (Burghele-Balacesco, 1969) (Czech Republic, Poland, Romania, Slovakia)
- Chionea catalonica (Bourne, 1979) (Spain: central Pyrenees)
- Chionea jurassica (Bourne, 1979) (France)
- Chionea lutescens
  - Chionea lutescens lutescens Lundstrom, 1907 (Europe: Sweden to Portugal, Ukraine, Russia)
  - Chionea lutescens stelviana Suss, 1982 (Italy: Lombardia)
- Chionea pyrenaea (Bourne, 1981) (France: Pyrenees)

== See also ==
- Snow scorpionflies
