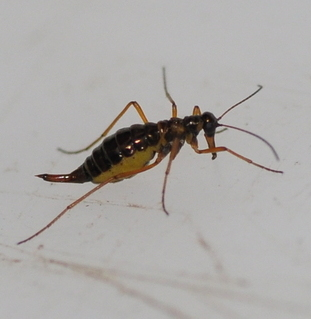

Scientific classification
- Kingdom: Animalia
- Phylum: Arthropoda
- Clade: Pancrustacea
- Class: Insecta
- Order: Mecoptera
- Family: Boreidae
- Genus: Boreus
- Species: B. hyemalis

Binomial name
- Boreus hyemalis Linnaeus, 1767

Synonyms
- Boreus hiemalis

= Boreus hyemalis =

Species of insect

Boreus hyemalis is a European insect known in Britain as the snow flea. Its family is the Boreidae and it is the type species of genus Boreus; (other species may also be called "snow scorpionflies" in North America).

== Description ==
This species is 3 to 4.5 mm long and has stubby, grey-brown wings with a metallic sheen. Snow fleas crawl or hop over the snow at temperatures around freezing point and thus resemble glacier fleas and snow flies.

The males have 4 short, wing vestiges which curve downwards at their ends. The females only have two scale-like wing vestiges. In general, the female may be recognised from a curved, sabre-like pipe that acts as an ovipositor. In their fully formed state, these animals are only found in the colder period of the year between October and March. During this time mating takes place. The larvae live on moss-covered areas and withdraw in September into holes in the ground to pupate.
