= Plug-in electric vehicles in Wyoming =

As of 2022, there were about 500 electric vehicles in Wyoming.

== Charging stations ==
As of April 2022, there were 58 public charging stations in Wyoming.

The Infrastructure Investment and Jobs Act, signed into law in November 2021, allocates US$25 million to charging stations in Wyoming.

As of June 2022, the state and federal governments recognize I-25, I-80, and I-90 as potential charging corridors.

== By region ==
=== Casper ===
As of March 2022, there were 34 electric vehicles registered in Natrona County.

=== Cheyenne ===
As of March 2022, there were 106 electric vehicles registered in Laramie County.
