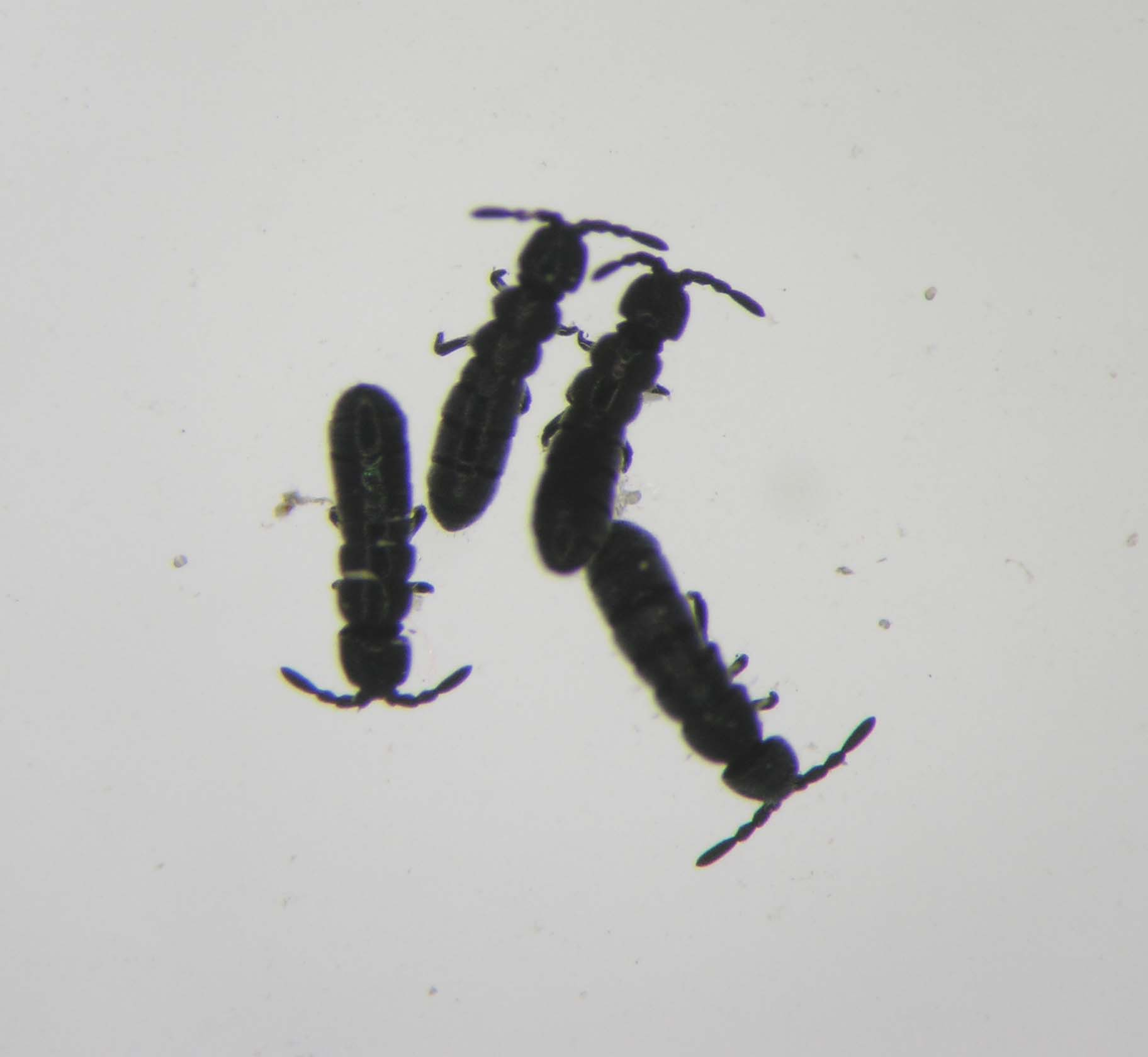
- A group of glacier fleas assembled on the Tiefenbachferner, Tyrol, Austria

Scientific classification
- Kingdom: Animalia
- Phylum: Arthropoda
- Clade: Pancrustacea
- Class: Collembola
- Order: Entomobryomorpha
- Family: Isotomidae
- Genus: Desoria
- Species: D. saltans

Binomial name
- Desoria saltans Nicolet, 1841

= Glacier flea =

Species of springtail

The glacier flea is a group of glacial springtail. D. saltans is the most famous species of glacier flea, the first one described (Nicolet, 1841) but there are several springtail species that are also called glacier fleas, and which catch the attention on snow surfaces due to their dark body colouring, their hopping motion and the fact that they often gather in large groups.

D. saltans is 1.5 – 2.5 millimetres long and lives on the glaciers and snowfields of the Alps, where it feeds on substances such as cryoconite, pollen and plant remains and snow algae of the genus Chlamydomonas. The jet black animal is easy to spot on light backgrounds and gathers in great numbers on surfaces during the melt season.

== See also ==
- Snow flea
- Boreus hyemalis, also known as the snow flea or snow scorpionfly

== Literature ==
- Eduard Handschin (1924): Die Collembolenfauna des Schweizerischen Nationalparks. Denkschriften der Schweizerischen Naturforschenden Gesellschaft 60: 89-174.
- Mikhail Potapov (2001): Synopses on Palearctic Collembola Part III: Isotomidae. Abhandlungen und Berichte des Naturkundemuseums Görlitz 73: 1-603.
