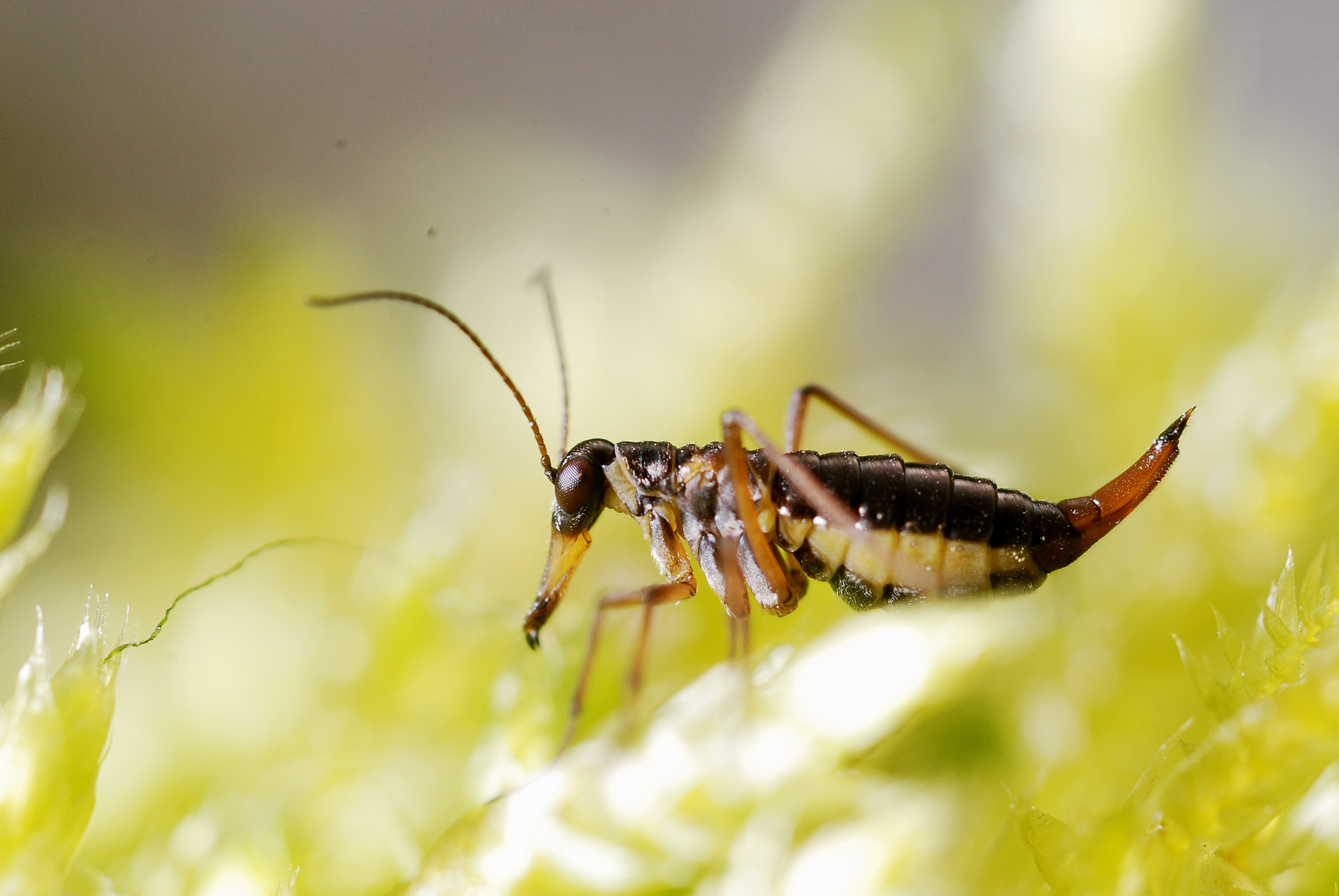
- Boreus hyemalis

Scientific classification
- Kingdom: Animalia
- Phylum: Arthropoda
- Clade: Pancrustacea
- Class: Insecta
- Order: Mecoptera
- Family: Boreidae

Genera
- Boreus; Caurinus; Hesperoboreus

= Snow scorpionfly =

Family of insects

Boreidae, commonly called snow scorpionflies, or in the British Isles, snow fleas (no relation to the snow flea Hypogastrura nivicola) are a very small family of scorpionflies, containing only around 30 species, all of which are boreal or high-altitude species in the Northern Hemisphere.

These insects are small (typically 6 mm or less), with the wings reduced to bristles or absent, and they are somewhat compressed, so in fact some resemblance to fleas is noted. They are most commonly active during the winter months, towards the transition into spring, and the larvae and adults typically feed on mosses. The adults will often disperse between breeding areas by walking across the open snow, thus the common name. The wings of females are small and vestigial oval pads with no ability to allow them to fly, but the male use his bristle-like wings to help grasp the female from below while she is positioned over him during mating. The adults have a long rostrum formed from the clypeus and labrum, genae, and maxillo-labium.

The body temperature, and therefore activity level, of this scorpionfly depends on its absorption of short-wave and long-wave radiation rather than surrounding air temperatures (by which it is completely unaffected). The boundary layer of snow that the insect occupies has very low thermal conductance, and so the insect loses its own heat very slowly here. This delicate balance between cold and heat means that the animal is easily killed by heat when held in a human hand.

Both their middle and hindlegs can be used for jumping. Males transfer their sperm as a spermatophore, which differs from most males in the order, where liquid ejaculation is the general rule. The genus Caurinus differ from Boreus and Hesperoboreus in having larvae with thoracic legs consisting of a single segment, while the larvae of the two latter has three-segmented thoracic legs.

The group has been proposed in some studies to be the closest relatives of fleas (Siphonaptera), which would render Mecoptera paraphyletic. This has been disputed by other studies, which find Nannochoristidae more closely related to fleas instead.

== Phylogeny ==
It is unclear as of 2020 whether the Mecoptera form a single clade, or whether the Siphonaptera (fleas) are inside that clade, so that the traditional "Mecoptera" is paraphyletic. However the earlier suggestion that the Siphonaptera are sister to the Boreidae is not supported. The two possible trees are shown below:

(a) Mecoptera is paraphyletic, Boreidae is sister to (Nannochoristidae + Siphonaptera):

- Antliophora
  - Diptera (true flies)
  - - Pistillifera (scorpionflies, hangingflies, 400 spp.)
    - - - Nannochoristidae (southern scorpionflies, 8 spp.)
        - Siphonaptera (fleas, 2500 spp.)
      - Boreidae (snow scorpionflies, 30 spp.)

(b) Mecoptera is monophyletic, Boreidae is sister to Pistillifera:

- Antliophora
  - Mecoptera
    - - Pistillifera (scorpionflies, hangingflies, 400 spp.)
      - Boreidae (snow scorpionflies, 30 spp.)
    - Nannochoristidae (southern scorpionflies, 8 spp.)
  - Siphonaptera
    (fleas, 2500 spp.)

== Genera ==
This list is adapted from the World Checklist of extant Mecoptera species, and is complete as of 1997. The number of species in each genus is indicated in parentheses.

- Boreus (24) Latreille, 1816 (North America, Europe, Asia)
  - Boreus hyemalis – also called the snow flea.
- Caurinus (2) Russell, 1979 (Oregon, Alaska)
- Hesperoboreus (2) Penny, 1977 (United States)

== See also ==
- Glacier flea
- Snow flies genus Chionea – a convergent genus of wingless crane flies
- Apteropanorpidae – another family of wingless scorpionflies
