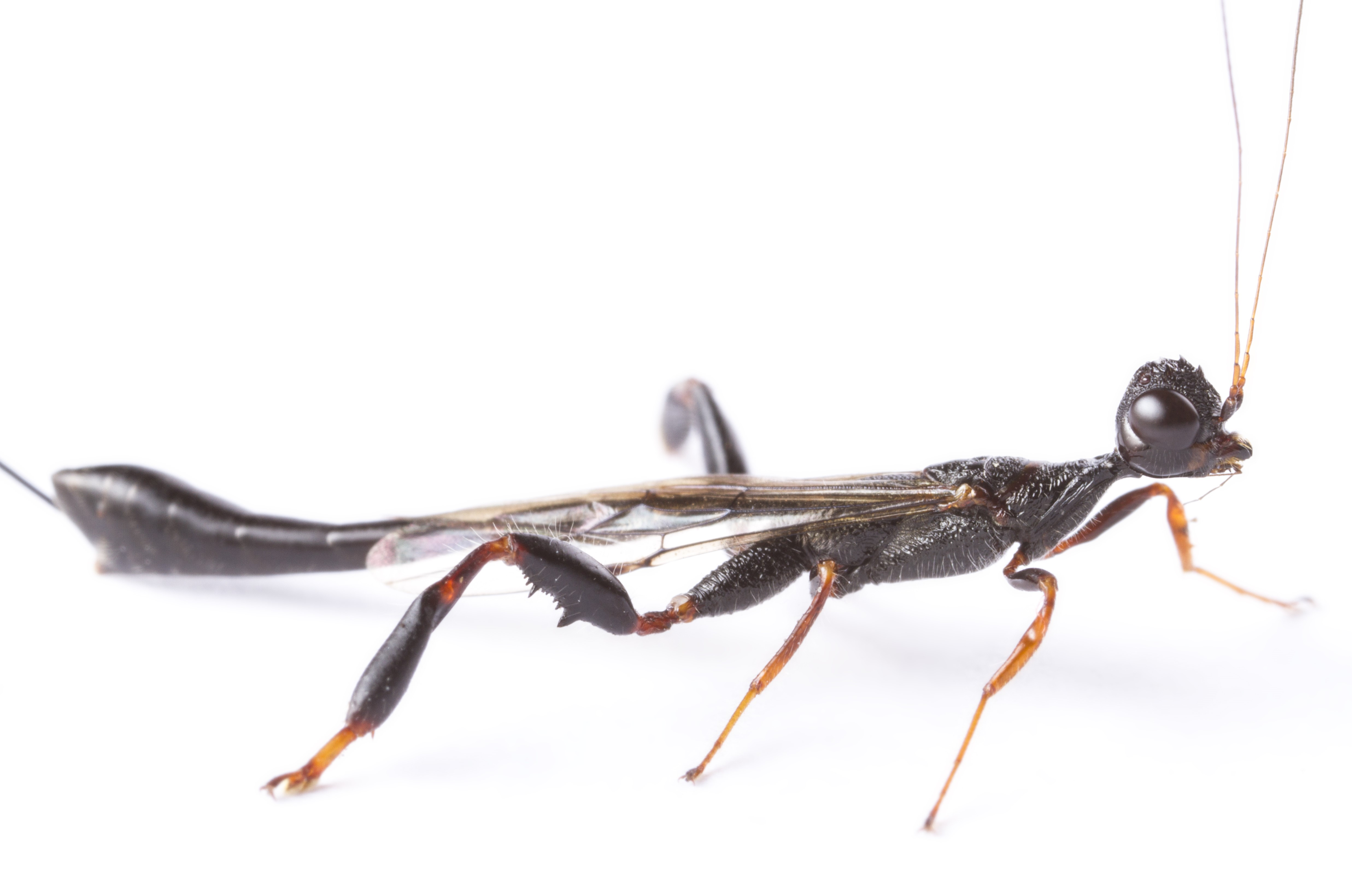

Scientific classification
- Kingdom: Animalia
- Phylum: Arthropoda
- Class: Insecta
- Order: Hymenoptera
- Family: Stephanidae
- Genus: Megischus
- Species: M. bicolor

Binomial name
- Megischus bicolor Westwood, 1841

= Megischus bicolor =

Species of wasp

Megischus bicolor is a species of parasitic wasp found in the United States and northern Mexico.
