= Protostephanus =

Protostephanus Temporal range: Late Eocene

Scientific classification
- Domain: Eukaryota
- Kingdom: Animalia
- Phylum: Arthropoda
- Class: Insecta
- Order: Hymenoptera
- Family: Stephanidae
- Genus: †Protostephanus
- Species: †P. ashmeadi

Binomial name
- †Protostephanus ashmeadi Cockerell, 1906

Extinct genus of wasps

Protostephanus is an extinct genus of crown wasp in the Hymenoptera family Stephanidae known from an Eocene fossil found in the United States of America. The genus contains a single described species, Protostephanus ashmeadi placed in the stephanid subfamily Stephaninae.

== History and classification ==
Protostephanus is known only from a single fossil, the holotype, specimen number "2035" and formerly number 13913 of the Samuel Hubbard Scudder collection. The specimen is housed in the fossil collection of the Museum of Comparative Zoology, part of Harvard University. The specimen is composed of a partially complete adult female crown wasp that has been preserved as a compression fossil in shale of fine volcanic ash from the Florissant Formation in Colorado. When the fossil was first recovered and studied, the age of the Florissant Formation was not firmly determined, and a tentative Miocene date was advocated. The formation has subsequently been determined to be late Eocene in age. The Protostephanus fossil was first studied by paleoentomologist Theodore Dru Alison Cockerell of the Museum of Comparative Zoology. Cockerell's 1906 type description of the new genus and species was published in the journal Bulletin of the Museum of Comparative Zoology at Harvard College. The genus name Protostephanus was coined by Cockerell as a combination of the Greek word proto meaning "first" and the stephanid genus Stephanus. The specific epithet ashmeadi was coined in honor of William Harris Ashmead whose entomology works were referenced by Cockerell to determine the affinities of the insect. Protostephanus is the first crown wasp genus to have been described from a fossil, and is the youngest fossil genus in the family. Cockerell was uncertain of his placement for the Protostephanus as a crown wasp, not being able to see all the features typical of the family. This uncertainty remained until the holotype was reexamined by Alexandre Aguiar and Jens-Wilhelm Janzen in 1999. Aguiar and Janzen concluded that the placement was sound with most of the expected features being present partly or fully. The incomplete nature of the specimen lead to the genus being left unplaced in the subfamily Stephaninae when it was subdivided into tribes.

== Description ==
The Protostephanus adult is preserved in a side view, with an overall length of 9.5 millimetres (0.37 in). As with all crown wasps, a series of projections surrounding the middle ocellus, forming a "crown" head are present. The side and rear projections are clearly preserved in the Protostephanus holotype. The hyaline (translucent) fore-wings have an overall length of 6 millimetres (0.24 in) with veins that show a preserved brassy coloration. The wing venation is almost exactly the same as that seen in the modern genera Schlettererius and Megischus. The hind legs show a typical crown wasp structure, having an inflated tibia, and a lengthened tarsus that is divided into three segments. There is no definable male genitalia on the type specimen; rather, there is a probable ovipositor indicating the specimen is female.
