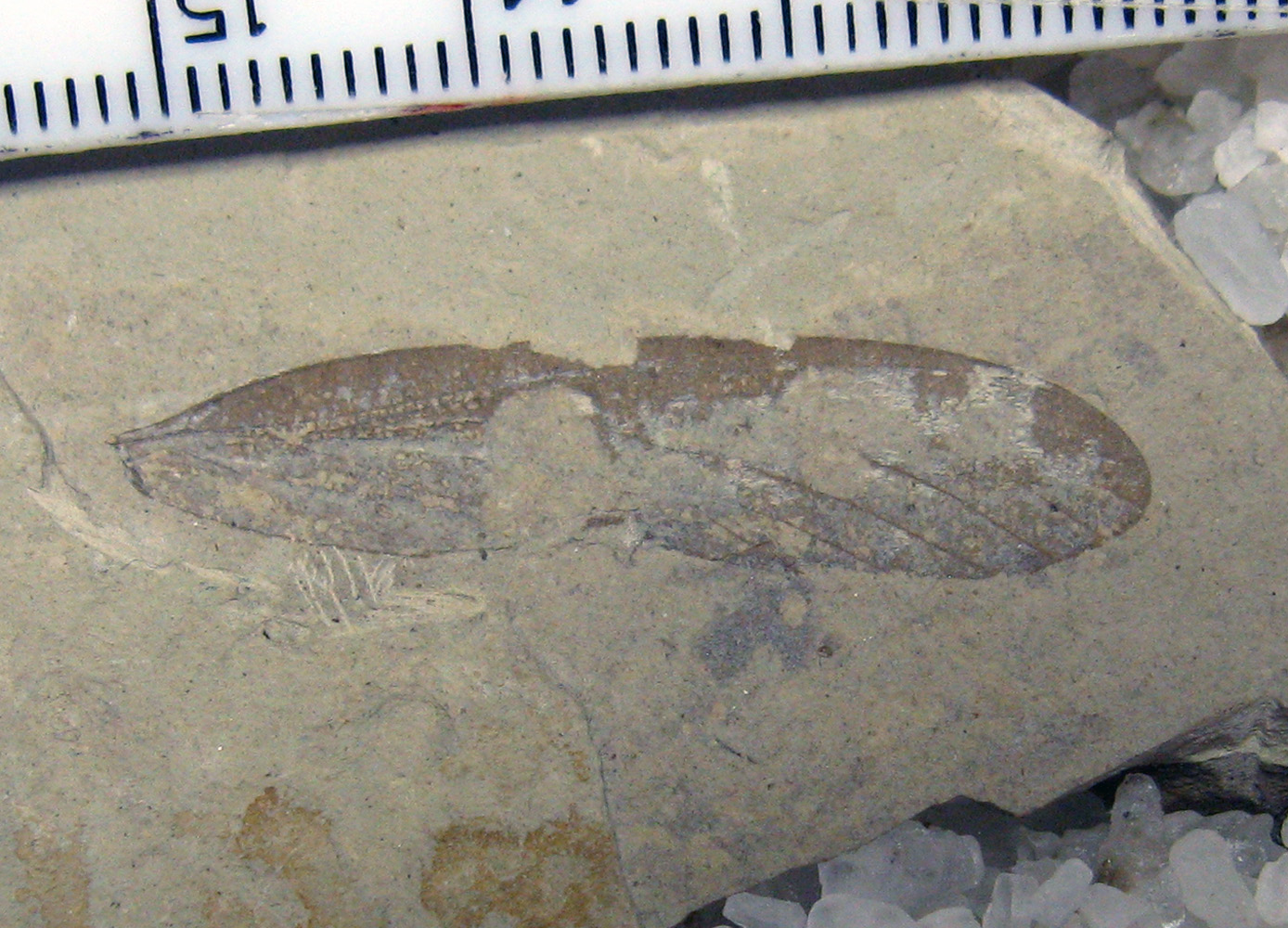
- Dinokanaga andersoni holotype

Scientific classification
- Kingdom: Animalia
- Phylum: Arthropoda
- Class: Insecta
- Order: Mecoptera
- Superfamily: Panorpoidea
- Family: †Dinopanorpidae; Carpenter, 1972

Genera
- Dinopanorpa; Dinokanaga

= Dinopanorpidae =

Dinopanorpidae Temporal range: Paleocene–Late Eocene

Extinct family of insects

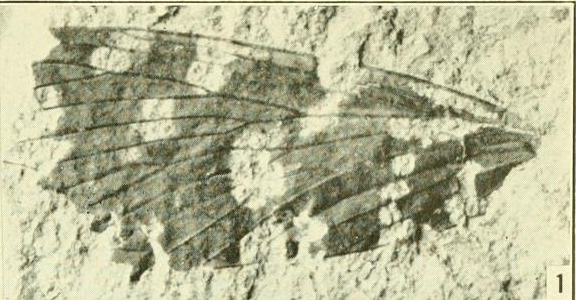
Dinopanorpa megarche holotype

Dinopanorpidae is a small family of extinct insects in the order Mecoptera (scorpionflies) that contains two genera and seven species.

The name is a combination of the Greek deino meaning "terrible" or "monstrous" and "Panorpidae", the family to which Dinopanorpa (the type genus of this family) was first assigned. The family was first described in 1972 by paleoentomologist Dr. Frank Carpenter to encompass the genus Dinopanorpa described by Dr. Theodore D.A. Cockerell in 1924. As with all members of order Mecoptera, dinopanorpids possess an elongated rostrum and four elongated wings of nearly equal size, and uniquely a "R_{1}" vein which almost reaches the apex of the wing. The elongated "R_{1}" vein is a character not found in any other extant or extinct mecopterans.

== Range ==
The distribution of Dinopanorpidae is restricted both in time and in location. An undescribed species of Dinopanorpa has been reported from the Paleocene Tadushi Formation, while the type and only specimen of Dinopanorpa megarche is from the Khutsin Formation of Primorsky Krai, Russia. The Khutsin Formation has been interpreted as dating from the early Eocene to the late Eocene/early Oligocene boundary. The genus Dinokanaga is known exclusively from fossil sites in western North America, which date to the Ypresian and constitute the Okanagan Highlands paleobiotic communities.

== Morphology ==
As most of the species are known from a limited number of compression wing fossils, few data on the general morphology of the family are available. The wings of Dinopanorpidae species are generally long with numerous reticulated cross veins and, when preserved, specimens show the coloration to have been mostly dark with light to clear patterning. The Okanagan Highlands flora is considered a possible antecedent of the modern eastern hardwood forests of North America. Six of the seven species currently described in Dinopanorpidae belong to Dinokanaga, while Dinopanorpa is monotypic with only D. megarche. Sizes vary widely, with forewing lengths ranging from 28 to 43 mm (1.1 to 1.7 in).
