= N. fenestrata =

N. fenestrata may refer to:

- Neopanorpa fenestrata, Needham, 1909, a scorpionfly species in the genus Neopanorpa found in India
- Nephila fenestrata, Thorell, 1859, a spider species in the genus Nephila found in South Africa
- Notoacmea fenestrata, the fenestrate limpet, a sea snail species in the genus Notoacmea

== See also ==
- Fenestrata (disambiguation)
