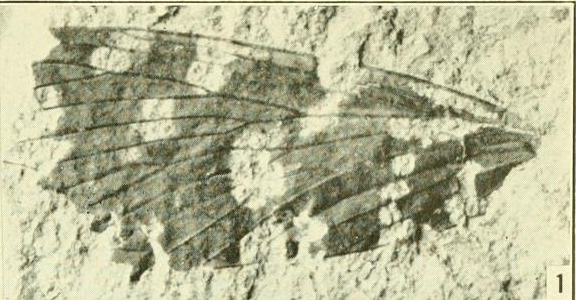
- Dinopanorpa megarche holotype hindwing

Scientific classification
- Kingdom: Animalia
- Phylum: Arthropoda
- Class: Insecta
- Order: Mecoptera
- Family: †Dinopanorpidae
- Genus: †Dinopanorpa; Cockerell, 1924
- Species: †D. megarche

Binomial name
- †Dinopanorpa megarche Cockerell, 1924

Synonyms
- Orthophlebia megarche Martynova, 1962

= Dinopanorpa =

Dinopanorpa Temporal range: Paleocene–Late Eocene

Extinct genus of insects

Dinopanorpa is an extinct monotypic genus of scorpionfly that contains the single species Dinopanorpa megarche and is the type genus of the extinct family Dinopanorpidae. The genus is known from a single hindwing specimen, the holotype, currently deposited in the collections of the National Museum of Natural History, as number "69173", and which was first described by Dr Theodore D.A. Cockerell in 1924. The name is a combination of the Greek deino meaning "terrible" or "monstrous" and "Panorpa", the type genus of Panorpidae the family in which Dinopanorpa was first placed.

The hindwing was found by A. Kuzentzov in Early Eocene to Early Oligocene Khutsin Formation deposits outcropping along the Kudya River in Primorsky Krai, Russia. The 30 millimetres (1.2 in) long specimen is a nearly complete compression fossil missing only a small section near the tip of the wing due to a break in the matrix, and having well preserved dark and light coloration. Dinopanorpa possesses an "R_{1}" vein which almost reaches the apex of the wing and turns down towards the wing tip near its termination. This elongated "R_{1}" vein is a character not found in any other extant or extinct mecopteran families and is only shared by the related genus Dinokanaga found in Eocene formations of British Columbia, Canada and Washington state, United States. The two genera are distinguished by the number of wing vein characters including lack of fine reticulated crossveins in Dinopanorpa, and the "Rs" vein branched 3-5 times in Dinokanaga.

Dr. Cockerell placed Dinopanorpa in the modern family Panorpidae when describing the genus in 1924. This placement was changed by Dr Robert Tillyard who reexamined the genus in 1933 and moved Dinoanorpa to the extinct family Orthophlebiidae. The move to Orthophlebiidae was not only maintained by Dr O. Martynova but strengthened when she synonymized Dinopanorpa with the genus Orthophlebia in 1962. This synonymy and familial placement was rejected in 1972 when Dr Frank Carpenter resurrected the genus Dinoanorpa and moved it to the new family Dinopanorpidae. Though the genus is considered monophyletic at this time, an undescribed new species has been reported. In a 1978 publication Dr. V. Zherikhin reported, but did not illustrate or figure, a scorpionfly specimen which belongs to a new species of Dinopanorpa from the Paleocene Tadushi Formation in Primorsky Krai. However, since the 1978 reference no further study of the specimen has occurred and the species remains unnamed.
