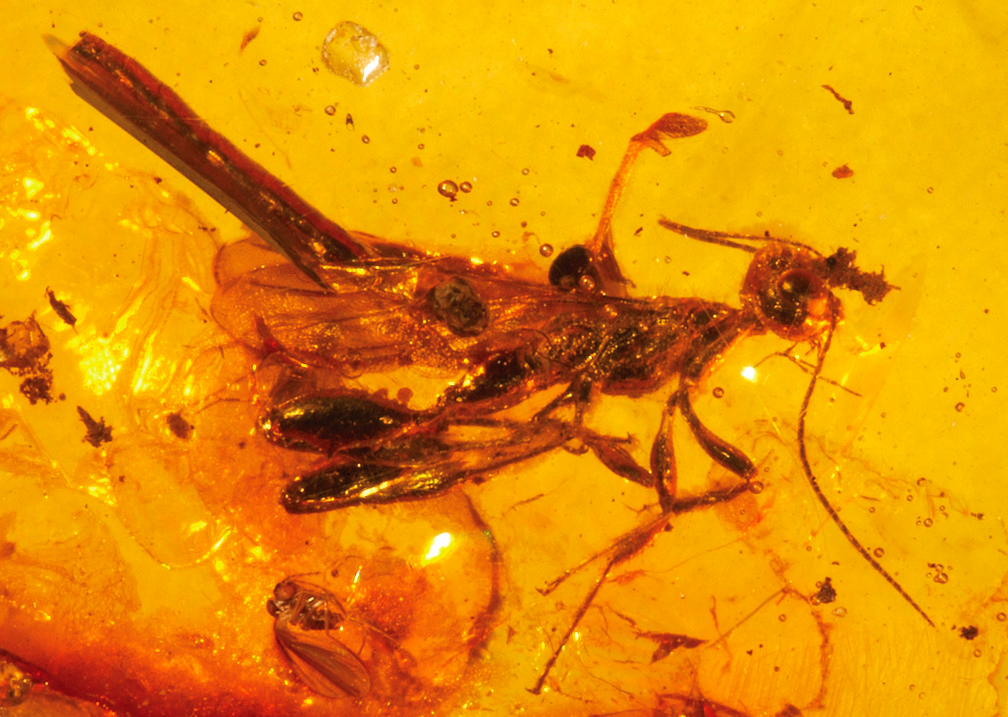
- Electrostephanus petiolatus neotype male

Scientific classification
- Kingdom: Animalia
- Phylum: Arthropoda
- Class: Insecta
- Order: Hymenoptera
- Family: Stephanidae
- Subfamily: †Electrostephaninae
- Genus: †Electrostephanus; Brues, 1933

Subgenera
- See text

= Electrostephanus =

Electrostephanus Temporal range: Lutetian

Extinct genus of wasps

Electrostephanus is an extinct genus of crown wasp in the hymenopteran family Stephanidae, and is the only genus placed in the subfamily Electrostephaninae. The genus contains four described species, E. brevicornis, E. neovenatus, E. janzeni, and E. petiolatus, placed in two subgenera E. (Electrostephanus) and E. (Electrostephanodes). Electrostephanus is known from several middle Eocene fossils which have been found in Europe.

== History and classification ==
Electrostephanus is known from a group of fossils preserved as an inclusions in transparent chunks of Baltic amber and is named after the Greek term for amber, ἤλεκτρον (elektron). Baltic amber is approximately forty-six million years old, having been deposited during Lutetian stage of the Middle Eocene. There is debate as to what plant family the amber was produced by, with evidence supporting relatives of either Agathis or Pseudolarix trees. The genus was originally described by paleoentomologist Charles Thomas Brues in 1933 with Brues designating E. petiolatus as the type species, and including two other species, E. tridentatus and E. brevicornis. A fourth species, "E." sulcatus and fifth, E. neovenatus, were described by Alexandre Aguiar and Jens-Wilhelm Janzen 1999, and a sixth species. E. janzeni, was described in 2005. The original type specimens for E. petiolatus, "E." tridentatus and "E." brevicornis were part of the Albertus Universität, Königsberg collection of ambers, and all were possibly lost to fire during the bombing of Kaliningrad in World War II.

Based on the structure of the petiole and abdomen in "E.". sulcatus and the suggestion that E. petiolatus had the same morphology, Electrostephanus was designated a junior synonym of Denaeostephanus in 2004. However, this move was reversed with the description of an additional male E. petiolatus specimen in 2008 by Michael S. Engel and Jaime Ortega-Blanco, who designated the new specimen the neotype for E. petiolatus. Engel and Ortega-Blanco transferred the species back to Electrostephanus along with E. brevicornis, E. neovenatus, and E. janzeni, but retaining D. tridentatus in Denaeostephanus. Based on the abdomen morphology Engel and Ortega-Blanco further split the genus into two distinct subgenera, E. (Electrostephanus) containing the type species E. petiolatus, and E. (Electrostephanodes) containing the remaining three species. They noted that Electrostephanodes may merit elevation to full genus status, but the lack of additional known fossil specimens to consult meant they opted for a conservative subgenus placement.

== Description ==
The Electrostephanus petiolus male adult has an elongated body which is 9.84 mm (0.387 in) long with an overall coloration ranging from black to dark brown and having scattered setae. The head capsule is generally spherical with rounded compound eyes on the lateral surface. The typical "crown" is a group of five tubercles places in front of four small ridges running crossways over the head capsule. The antennae are composed of 22 flagellomeres and scape, attaching to the head near the mid-line of the compound eyes. The wings are hyaline in coloration, with a dark brown pterostigma that is parallel sided and the estimated fore-wing length is 5.04 mm (0.198 in). The metasoma is narrow and forms a petiole.
