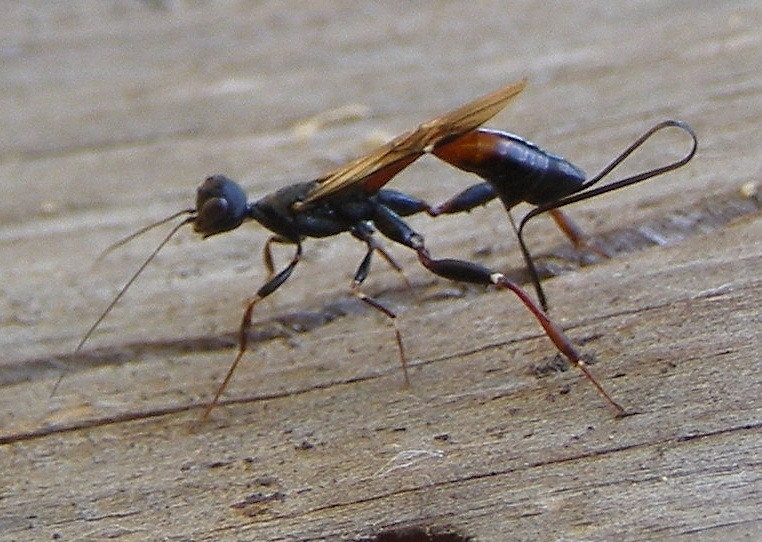
- Female ovipositing

Scientific classification
- Domain: Eukaryota
- Kingdom: Animalia
- Phylum: Arthropoda
- Class: Insecta
- Order: Hymenoptera
- Family: Stephanidae
- Genus: Stephanus
- Species: S. serrator

Binomial name
- Stephanus serrator (Fabricius, 1798)

Synonyms
- Ichneumon serrator Fabricius, 1798; Stephanus coronatus Jurine (in Panzer), 1801

= Stephanus serrator =

Parasitic wasp

Stephanus serrator is a species of parasitic wasp in the family Stephanidae, the crown wasps. This species is native to much of Europe and is to be seen in the breeding season on recently dead timber or wood products. The larvae are parasitoids of the larvae of wood-boring beetles.

== Description ==
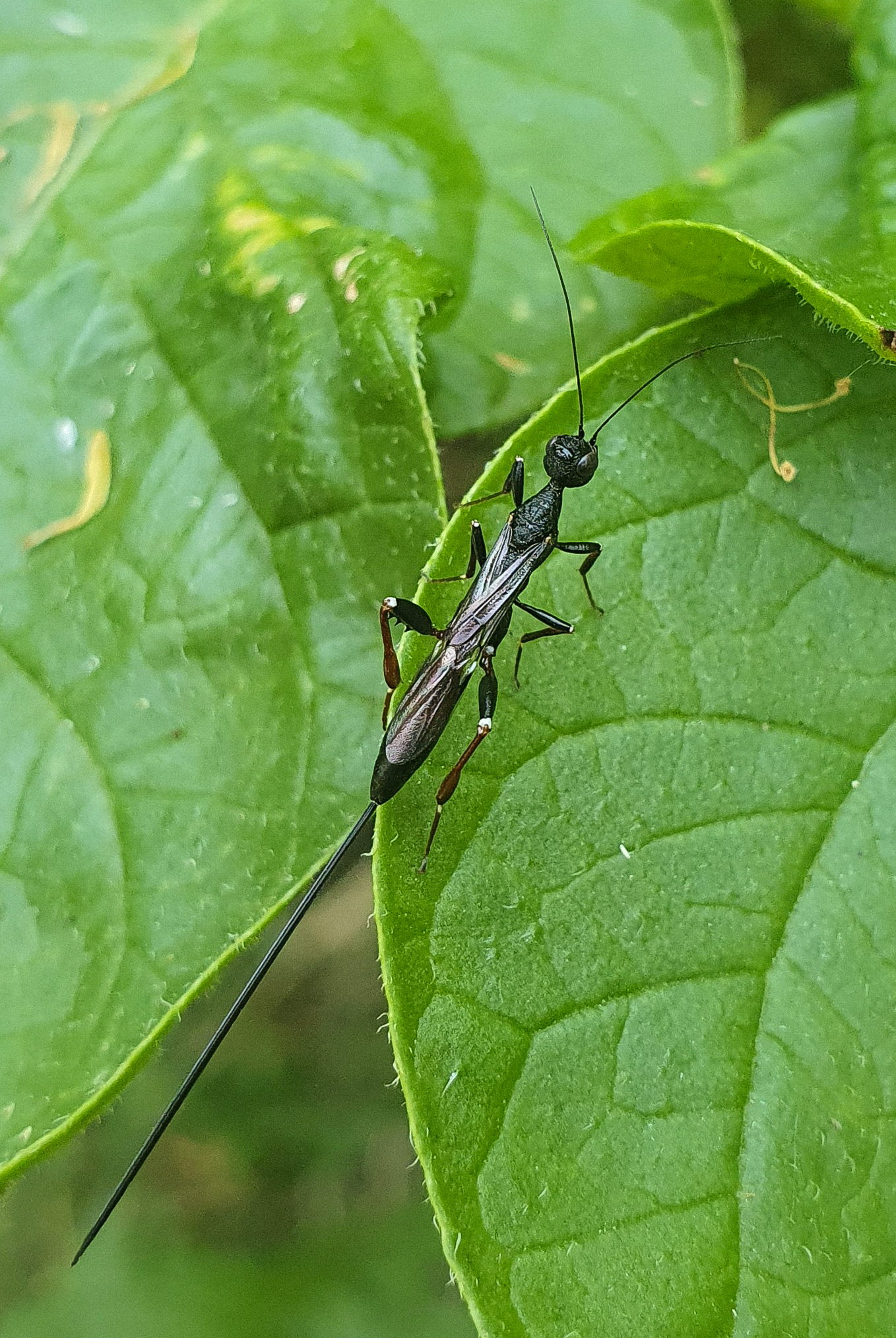
Stephanus serrator female

Stephanid wasps are known as crown wasps because the top of the wasp's head bears a group of five tubercles. The somewhat elongated prothorax is connected to the propodeum (the first abdominal segment) by a very long petiole, and the ventral side of the hind femur bears teeth. The male S. serrator averages 9.5 mm (0.37 in) in length and the female 13 mm (0.51 in), with an ovipositor of 11.4 mm (0.45 in). The slender body and legs are black, apart from the front half of the abdomen and certain leg segments, which are red.

== Distribution ==
S. serrator is known from Spain, France, Netherlands, Italy, Germany, Switzerland, Austria, Czech Republic, Hungary, Romania, Bulgaria, Croatia, Serbia and Montenegro. Adults can be found on and around trees that have been dead for about a year and which contain beetle larvae, but which have not yet been invaded by fungi; this wasp has been recorded parasitising several different host species. It is usually found in forests or other rural locations, but when recorded from Romania for the first time in 2015, the wasps were found on a timber shed in an urban environment. Other non-natural habitats where it has been observed include fencing, utility poles, wooden boarding and stacked firewood, in each case attracted by beetle larvae within.

== Ecology ==
S. serrator is a parasitoid of the larvae of wood-boring beetles. Despite being able to fly, these wasps usually move about by walking and usually avoid sunlight. Spiders such as Nuctenea umbratica and Parasteatoda spp. sometimes feed on the wasps, but the wasps usually manage to evade them. Female wasps that are trying to locate beetle larvae in wood adopt a characteristic posture with fore and hind legs spread widely, middle legs folded tightly against the body, antennae lowered and ovipositor sheath pressed against the wood; they then move a few centimetres to a new location and repeat the process. When a potential target is located, the ovipositor is bored into the substrate. Boring may take many hours, with rests in between the boring efforts, at which times the females withdraw their ovipositors. They seem to be able to re-locate the hole they were working on when they recommence boring. As the ovipositor is pushed deeper into the wood, the sheath arches upwards in a loop.

The eggs are laid in the galleries created by the beetle larvae. The developing wasp larvae feed on the beetle larvae, rejecting the most heavily chitinised parts. When fully developed they pupate in the galleries left by the beetle larvae. Male wasps emerge some ten days before the females and adopt a similar search posture, perhaps waiting for the females to emerge.
