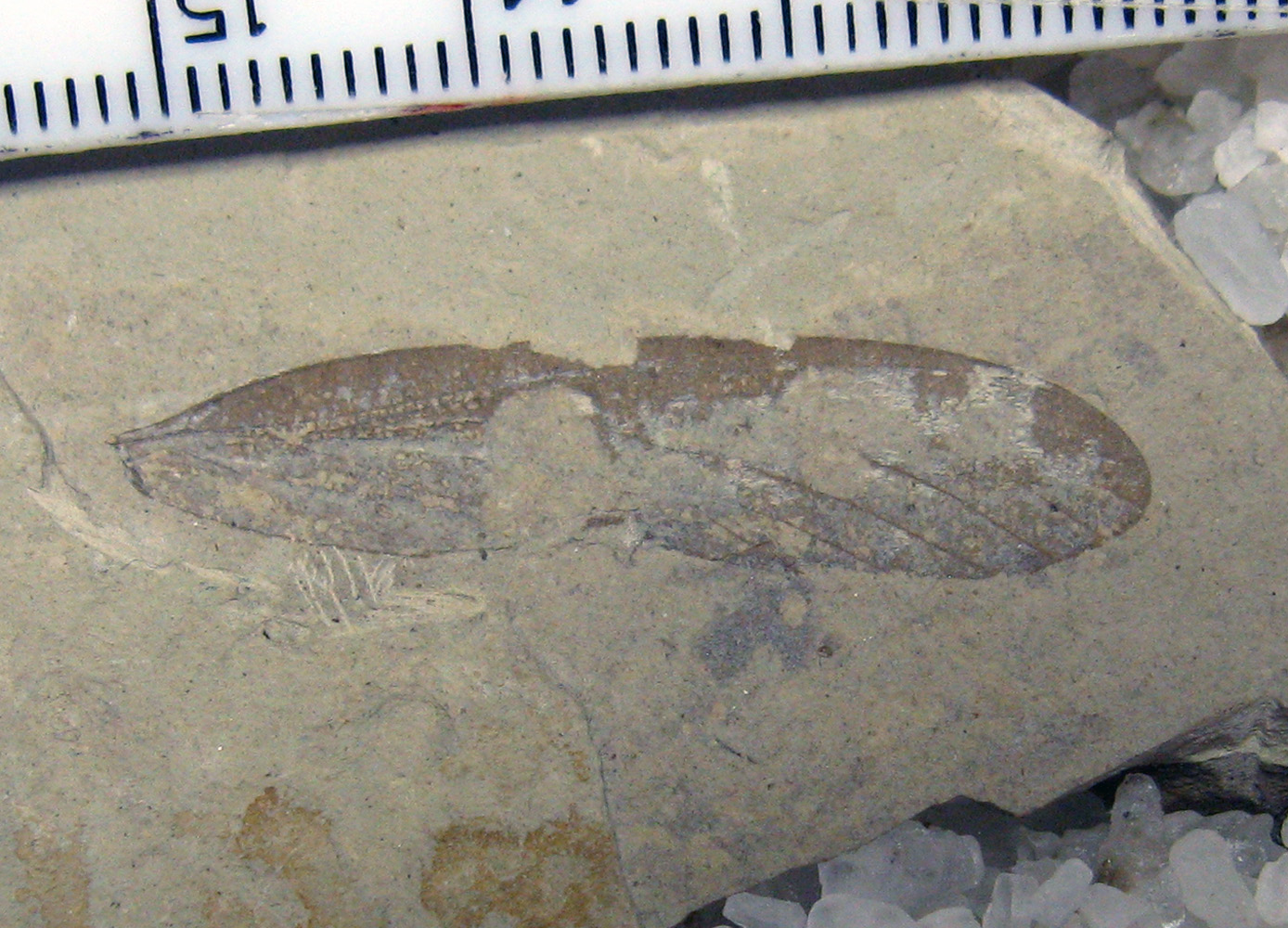
- Dinokanaga andersoni holotype

Scientific classification
- Kingdom: Animalia
- Phylum: Arthropoda
- Class: Insecta
- Order: Mecoptera
- Family: †Dinopanorpidae
- Genus: †Dinokanaga; Archibald, 2005

Species
- D. andersoni; D. dowsonae; D. hillsi; D. sternbergi; D. webbi; D. wilsoni

= Dinokanaga =

Dinokanaga Temporal range: Ypresian

Extinct genus of insects

Dinokanaga is a small genus of scorpionfly belonging to the extinct family Dinopanorpidae. The six species D. andersoni, D. dowsonae, D. hillsi, D. sternbergi, D. webbi, and D. wilsoni have all been recovered from Eocene fossil sites in British Columbia, Canada, and Washington state, United States.

== History and classification ==
Dinokanaga is a combination of the Greek word deino meaning "terrible" or "monstrous" and okanaga in reference to the Eocene Okanagan Highlands fossil sites where the specimens have been recovered. The type description of the genus was first published in 2005 by Dr. Bruce Archibald in the Canadian Journal of Earth Sciences. Description of the new genus was based on the study of over 20 compression fossil specimens from five fossil producing locations in the highlands. Dinokanaga and Dinopanorpa, currently the only known genera in the family Dinopanorpidae, are distinguished by a number of wing vein characters including lack of fine reticulated crossveins in Dinopanorpa, and the "Rs" vein branched 3-5 times in Dinokanaga. The fossil specimens of high preservation quality sometimes show the original color patterning, being mostly dark with light to clear areas. Within the genus wing characters are key to separating the species.

== Description ==
=== Dinokanaga hillsi ===
Dinokanaga hillsi, the type species, is identified by its subtriangular shaped wing which is widest at the middle, color pattern of three distinct dots, and an apical wing margin which is smoothly curved. D. hillsi along with D. dowsonae are the only two species in which part of the insects body is known, rather than just isolated wings. Though known from a number of specimens D. hillsi has only been found at the McAbee Fossil Beds near Cache Creek, British Columbia, and is named for Dr. Len Hills.

=== Dinokanaga dowsonae ===
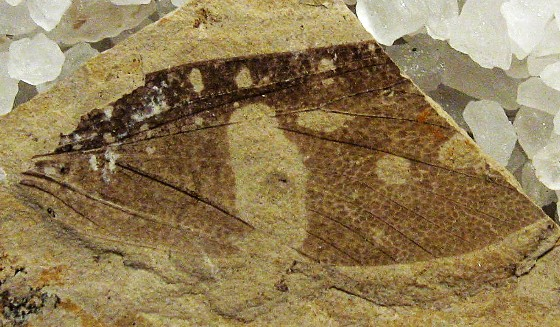
D. dowsonae forewing Klondike Mountain Formation

D. dowsonae is identified by the penniform shape of the wings, and by the size which is larger than similar shaped wings in the other species. D. dowsonae is he most wide spread of the species, occurring at three different fossil sites in the Okanagan Highlands while the five other species are restricted to a single site each. This species is named in honor of Shelley Dowson, collector of one of the specimen paratypes.

=== Dinokanaga andersoni ===
D. andersoni is known from only the holotype specimen, collected and housed at the Stonerose Interpretive Center in Republic, Washington. The species is notably narrower in the preserved areas of the holotype wing then other species. The species was named in honor of Eric Anderson who first collected the type specimen in 2001.

=== Dinokanaga sternbergi ===
The third species found in Republic is D. sternbergi, known from a 28 millimetres (1.1 in) long wing collected by Michael Sternberg in 1995, and for whom the species is named. The species is distinguished by the short length of the "Sc" vein and small size, D. webbi being the only species smaller in wing size.

=== Dinokanaga wilsoni ===
Only a single poorly preserved D. wilsoni hindwing has been found, but the shape is distinct enough to separate it from the other Dinokanaga species, being broadly a rounded oval. The sole specimen was found the Whipsaw Creek locality of the Allenby Formation near Princeton, British Columbia, and named for Dr. Mark Wilson of the University of Alberta.

=== Dinokanaga webbi ===
Easily distinguished from the other species, D. webbi is the smallest species of Dinokanaga with a hindwing only 24 millimetres (0.94 in) long and having numerous simple crossveins with only patches developing into a reticulated patterning. The type specimen was found in "Horsefly shale" outcrops along the Horsefly River near Horsefly, British Columbia, and the species named in honor of Robin Webb of British Columbia.

== Paleoenvironment ==
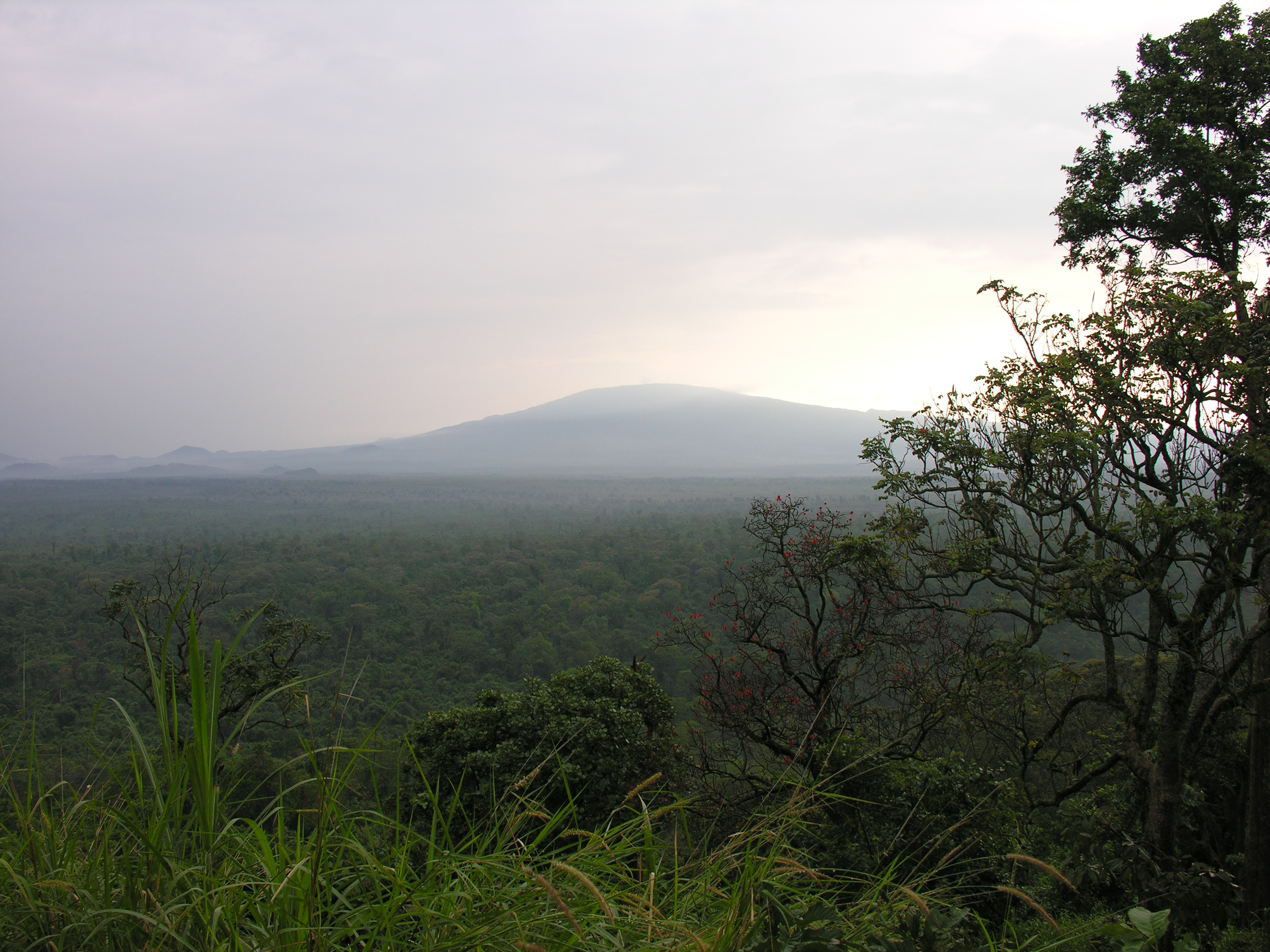
Virunga National Park, Albertine Rift, Africa

All three sites are part of a larger fossil site system collectively known as the Eocene Okanagan Highlands. The highlands, including the Early Eocene formations between Driftwood Canyon at the north and Republic at the south, have been described as one of the "Great Canadian Lagerstätten" based on the diversity, quality and unique nature of the paleofloral and paleofaunal biotas that are preserved. The highlands temperate biome preserved across a large transect of lakes recorded many of the earliest appearances of modern genera, while also documenting the last stands of ancient lines. The warm temperate highland floras in association with downfaulted lacustrine basins and active volcanism are noted to have no exact modern equivalents. This is due to the more seasonally equitable conditions of the Early Eocene, resulting in much lower seasonal temperature shifts. However, the highlands have been compared to the upland ecological islands in the Virunga Mountains within the Albertine Rift of the African rift valley.

The Republic and McAbee upland lake systems were surrounded by a warm temperate ecosystem with nearby volcanism. The highlands likely had a mesic upper microthermal to lower mesothermal climate, in which winter temperatures rarely dropped low enough for snow, and which were seasonably equitable. The paleoforests surrounding the lakes have been described as precursors to the modern temperate broadleaf and mixed forests of Eastern North America and Eastern Asia. Based on the fossil biotas the lakes were higher and cooler than the coeval coastal forests preserved in the Puget Group and Chuckanut Formation of Western Washington, which are described as lowland tropical forest ecosystems. Estimates of the paleoelevation range between 0.7–1.2 km (0.43–0.75 mi) higher than the coastal forests. This is consistent with the paleoelevation estimates for the lake systems, which range between 1.1–2.9 km (1,100–2,900 m), which is similar to the modern elevation 0.8 km (0.50 mi), but higher.

Estimates of the mean annual temperature have been derived from climate leaf analysis multivariate program (CLAMP) and leaf margin analysis (LMA) of the Republic and McAbee paleofloras. The CLAMP results after multiple linear regressions for Republic gave a mean annual temperature of approximately 8.0 °C (46.4 °F), with the LMA giving 9.2 ± 2.0 °C (48.6 ± 3.6 °F). CLAMP results from McAbee returned the higher 10.7 °C (51.3 °F) which was supported by the 10.4 ± 2.4 °C (50.7 ± 4.3 °F) returned from the LMA. These are lower than the mean annual temperature estimates given for the coastal Puget Group, which is estimated to have been between 15–18.6 °C (59.0–65.5 °F). The bioclimatic analysis for Republic and McAbee suggests mean annual precipitation amounts of 115 ± 39 cm (45 ± 15 in) and 108 ± 35 cm (43 ± 14 in) respectively.
