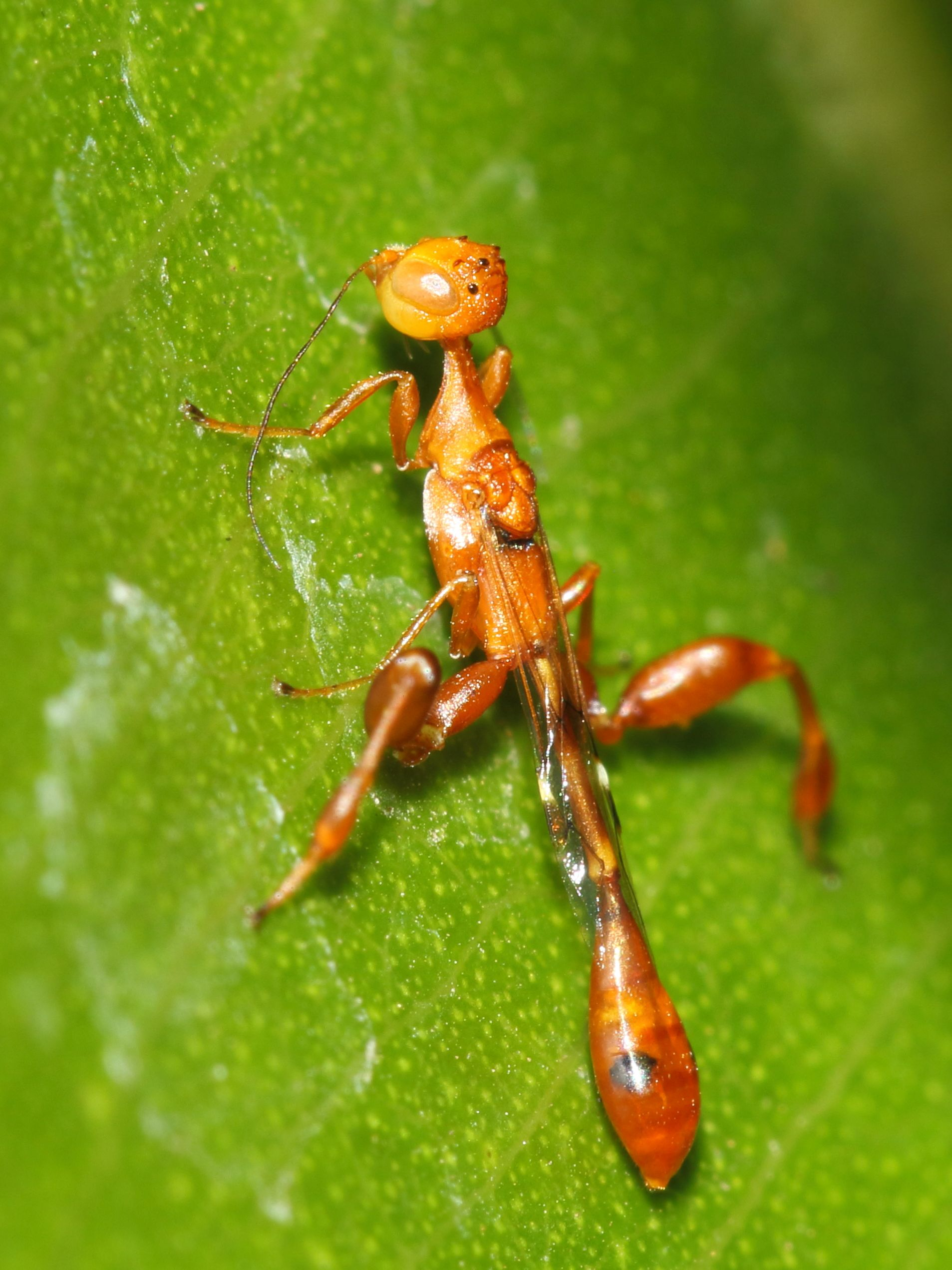
- Foenatopus alutaceous

Scientific classification
- Kingdom: Animalia
- Phylum: Arthropoda
- Class: Insecta
- Order: Hymenoptera
- Family: Stephanidae
- Subfamily: Stephaninae
- Genus: Foenatopus; Smith, 1861

Type species
- Stephanus indicus Westwood, 1841

= Foenatopus =

Genus of wasps

Foenatopus is a genus of parasitoid wasps in the family Stephanidae; it includes about half of the species in this family. They are mostly found tropical and subtropical regions within the Afrotropical, Neotropical, Palaearctic and Indomalayan realms. Little is known of their biology, but they are thought to be parasites (solitary idiobiont ectoparasitoids) of wood-boring insect larvae (mainly beetle larvae of the Cerambycidae and Buprestidae).

Most of the described species are listed in Aguiar (2004).
