= Sinopanorpa =

Scientific classification
- Domain: Eukaryota
- Kingdom: Animalia
- Phylum: Arthropoda
- Class: Insecta
- Order: Mecoptera
- Family: Panorpidae
- Genus: Sinopanorpa; Cai & Hua in Cai, Huang & Hua, 2008

Species
- See text

Genus of insects

Sinopanorpa is a genus of scorpionflies.

== Species ==
- Sinopanorpa baokangensis Wang, 2021
- Sinopanorpa digitiformis Huang & Hua in Cai, Huang & Hua, 2008
- Sinopanorpa minshanicola
- Sinopanorpa nangongshana Cai & Hua in Cai, Huang & Hua, 2008
- Sinopanorpa shennongjiaica
- Sinopanorpa tincta (Navás, 1931)
