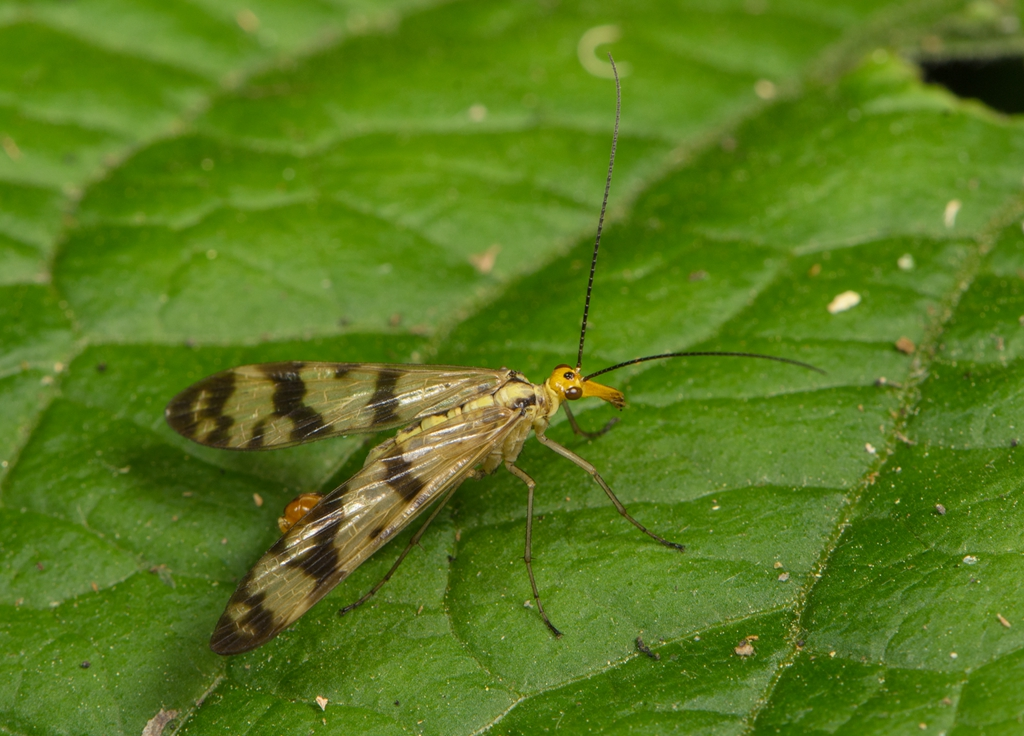

Scientific classification
- Domain: Eukaryota
- Kingdom: Animalia
- Phylum: Arthropoda
- Class: Insecta
- Order: Mecoptera
- Family: Panorpidae
- Genus: Dicerapanorpa; Zhong & Hua, 2013

Species
- See text

= Dicerapanorpa =

Genus of insects

Dicerapanorpa is a genus of scorpionflies endemic to China. They can be easily recognized by the two anal horns on the posterior margin of the sixth tergum in males.

The anal horns of Dicerapanorpa magna (Chou, 1981) are used to grasp the female's abdomen during mating.

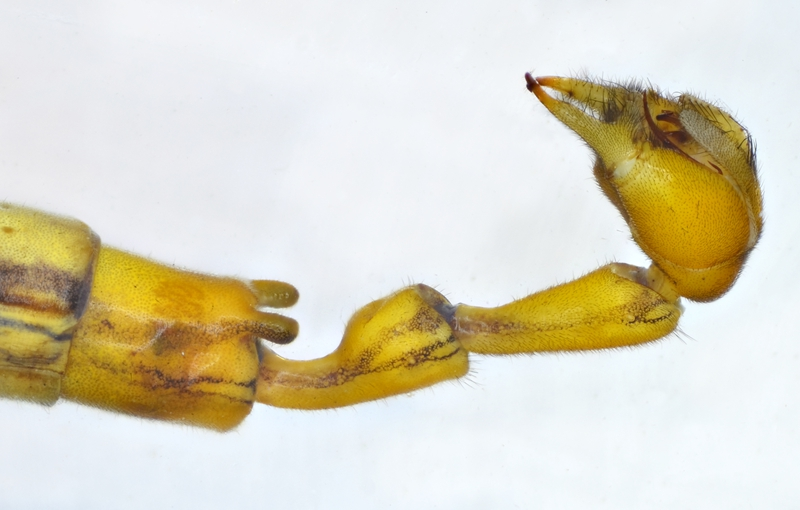
Terminal abdomen of a male Dicerapanorpa magna

== Species ==
Dicerapanorpa consists of 8 species.

- Dicerapanorpa baiyunshana Zhong et Hua, 2013
- Dicerapanorpa diceras (MacLachlan, 1894)
- Dicerapanorpa kimminsi (Carpenter, 1948)
- Dicerapanorpa magna (Chou in Chou et al., 1981)
- Dicerapanorpa shennongensis Zhong et Hua, 2013
- Dicerapanorpa stotzneri (Esben-Petersen, 1934)
- Dicerapanorpa tjederi (Carpenter, 1938)
- Dicerapanorpa triclada (Qian et Zhou, 2001)
