= Furcatopanorpa =

- Distribution of F. longihypovalva (orange)

Scientific classification
- Kingdom: Animalia
- Phylum: Arthropoda
- Clade: Pancrustacea
- Class: Insecta
- Order: Mecoptera
- Family: Panorpidae
- Genus: Furcatopanorpa; Ma & Hua, 2011
- Species: F. longihypovalva

Binomial name
- Furcatopanorpa longihypovalva Hua & Cai, 2009

Genus of scorpionflies

Furcatopanorpa is a genus of scorpionflies with a single species, Furcatopanorpa longihypovalva. It is endemic to the Qinling mountains of China and has a year-long life cycle: the larvae burrow underground to pupate, emerging as adults in the spring and summer. The adults are mostly black and brown in color, with some parts having yellow or orange tones. Originally considered a member of the genus Panorpa, its placement within the family Panorpidae has been heavily debated, proposals putting it in either panorpid subfamily or as part of a different one entirely.

== Taxonomy ==
F. longihypovalva was originally described by Bao-Zhen Hua and Li-Jun Cai under the name Panorpa longihypovalva in a 2009 paper in the Journal of Natural History. The species was transferred to its own genus, Furcatopanorpa, in 2011 by Hua and Na Ma, who argued that the several characteristics atypical of Panorpa it possessed warranted its separation. The family Panorpidae (scorpionflies), of which it is a member, is divided into two subfamilies: Panorpinae and Neopanorpinae. Furcatopanorpa is usually classified within Panorpinae, but morphological and molecular evidence has both supported and disputed this: molecular studies in the 2010s found Furcatopanorpa to be among the paraphyletic genus Panorpa, being particularly close to P. liui and P. japonica, (Note: Attributable to Hu et al. (2015), Miao et al. (2017), and Miao et al. (2018).) but those in the 2020s finding it to be a closer to Neopanorpinae, with Hua et al. proposing that it may belong to a new subfamily. A morphological study of the female scorpionfly genitalia found Furcatopanorpa to be in neither subfamily, instead being the most basal of all scorpionflies. Further morphological studies in 2021 found Furcatopanorpa to indeed be a part of Panorpinae, not being particularly close to any other Panorpa species. (Note: Attributable to Ning et al. (2021) and Wang & Hua (2021))

== Description ==
The eggs of F. longihypovalva are about a 0.74 mm (0.029 in) wide and 1.05 mm (0.041 in) long and covered in a hexagonal lattice, the color, dark gray, being markedly different from Panorpa species. After hatching, the larvae are about 3 mm (0.12 in) long, reaching about 14 mm (0.55 in) before pupating. The head bears two compound eyes with around 30 ommatidia and a set of protruding mouthparts. The thorax bears three pairs of segmented legs, and the first eight abdominal segments each bearing a pair of unsegmented prolegs. In adults, the back of the head and thorax are dark brown and the legs and side of the thorax are pale yellow to grayish-brown. The rostrum is long and slender and yellowish to orangish-brown. The wings are mostly clear with tan and brown markings, and are held at an angle relative to each other unlike other scorpionflies, which keep their wings parallel. They are significantly longer than the abdomen, being between 15 to 18 millimetres (0.59 to 0.71 in) long. The labrum is elongated compared to other scorpionflies. The mandibles are largely straight, ending in two curved teeth and a pointed bottom corner. In males, the abdomen is composed of eight segments and a genital bulb, which houses the reproductive system. They are all black in color except for the pleura, present in the fist five segments, which are yellow. The notal organ and anal horn are both lacking, used in reproduction in other species.

== Behavior and ecology ==
F. longihypovalva is endemic to the Qinling mountains of central China, residing in mixed coniferous forests primarily between elevations of 1,400 to 1,800 metres (4,600 to 5,900 ft). The adults emerge from their pupae from May to August annually and begin copulating about a week afterwards. Before mating, the male will vibrate his wings and swing his abdomen vertically, releasing sex pheromones to attract potential mates. Male scorpionflies typically use their notal organ to grasp onto the female during mating. As this is absent in F. longihypovalva, instead the male will secrete liquid saliva that is gifted to the female through mouth-to-mouth contact. This produces an O-shaped mating formation, the male and female being connected by the mouth and genitalia. The female will lay her eggs about 4-8 days after mating, hatching after an additional 8-12 days. The larva undergo 4 instar stages over 26-30 days, burrowing underground once fully grown to become pupae.
