= Anthidium exhumatum =

Anthidium exhumatum Temporal range: Priabonian to Rupelian

Scientific classification
- Kingdom: Animalia
- Phylum: Arthropoda
- Clade: Pancrustacea
- Class: Insecta
- Order: Hymenoptera
- Family: Megachilidae
- Genus: Anthidium
- Species: A. exhumatum

Binomial name
- Anthidium exhumatum Cockerell, 1906

Extinct species of bee

Anthidium exhumatum is an extinct species of mason bee in the Megachilidae genus Anthidium. The species is solely known from the late Eocene, Chadronian stage, Florissant Formation deposits in Florissant, Colorado, USA. Anthidium exhumatum is one of only four extinct species of mason bees known from the fossil record, and with Anthidium scudderi, one of two species from the Florissant Formation.

== History and classification ==
The species is known only from three fossils, the holotype and an additional fossil not designated a type specimen. The holotype, number "No. 2003", is a single male specimen consisting of part and counterpart fossils, originally part of the Samuel Hubbard Scudder collection as specimens "No. 13,709" and "No. 11,388". The additional specimen, "No.8444", is a female; all three fossils are currently residing in Harvard University's Museum of Comparative Zoology paleoentomology collections. A. exhumatum was first studied by Theodore Cockerell, who published the type description in the Bulletin of the Museum of Comparative Zoology, 1906. The derivation and meaning of the specific epithet exhumatum ("dug up") was not specified by Cockerell in the type description.

== Description ==
The holotype of Anthidium exhumatum is 13.5 millimetres (0.53 in) in length, however the body length is noted to probably be larger than in life due to crushing during fossilization. Both the head and thorax are a uniform dark coloration and were black in life and the mesothorax is rough in texture. The abdomen on contrast possesses large pale reddish bands which have no darkening along the margins and no spots visible. The female specimen, "No. 8444" had more strongly banded abdomen than that of the holotype male. The tip of the abdomen in the male is broadly rounded, a large section of which is occupied by the genitalia. The hind legs display flattened tarsi and the tibia have distinct and abundantly hairy scopa. The wings are clear with pale colored vein structure. The marginal cell of the wing is smaller than in the related Anthidium scudderi. Given the overall the coloration and structure of the wings, both A. exhumatum and A. scudderi have been placed in the genus Anthidium.
