= Primula rusbyi =

Scientific classification
- Kingdom: Plantae
- Clade: Tracheophytes
- Clade: Angiosperms
- Clade: Eudicots
- Clade: Asterids
- Order: Ericales
- Family: Primulaceae
- Genus: Primula
- Species: P. rusbyi

Binomial name
- Primula rusbyi Greene

Synonyms
- Primula ellisiae Pollard & Cockerell; Primula rusbyi var. ellisiae (Pollard & Cockerell) L.O. Williams; Primula serra Small

Species of flowering plant

Primula rusbyi is a species of Primula. A common name is Rusby's primrose.

This species was first collected by Henry Hurd Rusby in the Mogollon Mountains in the New Mexico Territory of the time (now the state New Mexico), Edward Lee Greene used these specimens as the holotype with which to describe P. rusbyi in 1881.

The species occurs from the southern Rockies in the United States through Mexico probably down to northern Guatemala. In the USA it occurs in Arizona and New Mexico. Although the range in the USA appears to be split into disjunct populations, this may be an artefact of ignoring the Mexican distribution.

Some plants from the Sandia Mountains of New Mexico have a longer corolla than the calyx, unlike the nominate type; these were described as Primula ellisiae in 1902 by Theodore Dru Alison Cockerell from a 1900 collection by Charlotte Cortlandt Ellis in the area of her family's ranch. However, individual plants with this phenotype grow together with plants having the normal form flowers, and no genetic distinctiveness was found between forms.
