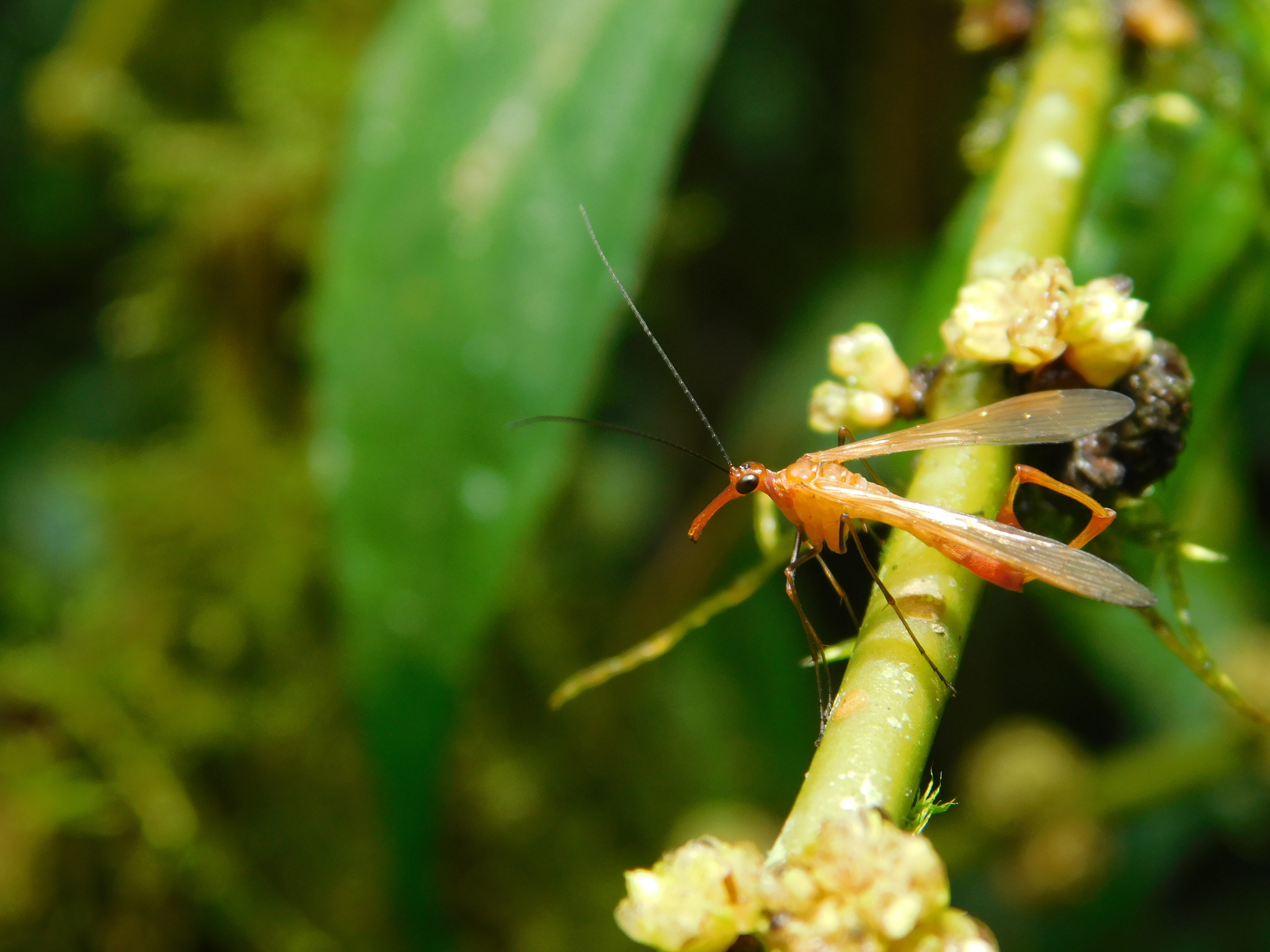
- Leptopanorpa filicauda

Scientific classification
- Domain: Eukaryota
- Kingdom: Animalia
- Phylum: Arthropoda
- Class: Insecta
- Order: Mecoptera
- Family: Panorpidae
- Genus: Leptopanorpa; MacLachlan, 1875

Species
- See text

= Leptopanorpa =

Genus of insects

Leptopanorpa is a genus of scorpionflies that mainly distributed in Java, with two species also occurring in Sumatra. The males have elongated abdomens which can they can use to compete with other males and these abdomen are also sexually displayed to females. A recent revision found that the genus was nested within a paraphyletic Neopanorpa.

== Species ==
This list is adapted from the World Checklist of extant Mecoptera species: Leptopanorpa and complete as of 1997.

- Leptopanorpa charpentieri (Burmeister, 1839) (Java, Sumatra)
- Leptopanorpa cingulata (Enderlein, 1912) (Java)
- Leptopanorpa filicauda Lieftinck, 1936 (Java)
- Leptopanorpa inconspicua Lieftinck, 1936 (Java)
- Leptopanorpa jacobsoni (van der Weele, 1909) (Java)
- Leptopanorpa javanica (Westwood, 1841) (Java, Sumatra)
- Leptopanorpa nematogaster (MacLachlan, 1869) (Java)
- Leptopanorpa peterseni Lieftinck, 1936 (Java)
- Leptopanorpa pi (van der Weele), 1909 (Java)

- Leptopanorpa pi decorata Lieftinck, 1936 (Java)

- Leptopanorpa ritsemae MacLachlan, 1875 (Java)
- Leptopanorpa robusta Lieftinck, 1936 (Java)
- Leptopanorpa sarangana Lieftinck, 1936 (Java)
