= Anthidium scudderi =

Anthidium scudderi Temporal range: Priabonian to Rupelian

Scientific classification
- Domain: Eukaryota
- Kingdom: Animalia
- Phylum: Arthropoda
- Class: Insecta
- Order: Hymenoptera
- Family: Megachilidae
- Genus: Anthidium
- Species: †A. scudderi

Binomial name
- †Anthidium scudderi Cockerell, 1906

Extinct species of bee

Anthidium scudderi is an extinct species of mason bee in the Megachilidae genus Anthidium. The species is solely known from the late Eocene, Chadronian stage, Florissant Formation deposits in Florissant, Colorado, USA. Anthidium scudderi is one of only four extinct species of mason bees known from the fossil record, and with Anthidium exhumatum, one of two species from the Florissant Formation.

== History and classification ==
The species is known only a single fossil, the holotype, number "No. 2002", is a single specimen of indeterminate genus, originally part of the Samuel Hubbard Scudder collection as specimen "No. 11381". The additional specimen, along with the three A. exhumatum fossils are currently residing in the Museum of Comparative Zoology paleoentomology collections at Harvard University. A. scudderi was first studied by Theodore Cockerell with his 1906 type description being published in the journal Bulletin of the Museum of Comparative Zoology. The specific epithet "scudderi" was coined by Theodore Cockerell in honor of Samuel Scudder who collected the specimens at Florissant.

== Description ==
The holotype of Anthidium scudderi, while incomplete, is approximately 15 millimetres (0.59 in) in length but is missing up to 5 millimetres (0.20 in) of the abdomen tip. The body length and width is noted to probably be larger than in life due to crushing during fossilization. Both the head and thorax are black with possible light patterning, with a large lighter patch on the vertex, the clypeus mostly light, and the mesothorax with two possible light stripes. Though not definitive the light stripes may have been a reddish. The abdomen in contrast is light in tone, possibly yellow in life, with the posterior edges of each segment darkening into a distinct stripe. There are indications of a possible subbasal band running along the abdomen in the subdorsal region. Due to preservation the antennae and legs are not visible in the specimen. The general coloration is similar to the modern Anthidium bernardinum, now a jr synonym of Anthidium placitum. The dark colored forewings of A. scudderi are 8 millimetres (0.31 in) in length and notably hairy in the basal region. The marginal cell of the wing is larger than in the related Anthidium exhumatum. Given the overall coloration and structure of the wings, both A. scudderi and A. exhumatum have been placed in the genus Anthidium.
