= Charlotte Cortlandt Ellis =

American botanist and plant collector

- Born: June 27, 1874; Joliet, Illinois
- Died: March 17, 1956 (aged 81)
- Known for: plant collector

Charlotte Cortlandt Ellis (June 27, 1874 – March 17, 1956) was an American amateur plant collector active in New Mexico. She discovered several plant taxa and collected some 500 plant specimens.

She was born to frontier family and had little education, but in 1892 she was able to enroll at the newly opened University of New Mexico at Albuquerque in the 'preparatory department', which was to ensure students were educated equivalent to a high school degree, and in the next school year she was to be promoted to the 'normal department'. She made her first plant collection here. In May 1893, however, after only 8 1/2 months her father took her out of college to help the family start a new ranch in a remote location in the Sandia Mountains. In the late 1890s she made contact with Theodore Dru Alison Cockerell and Elmer Ottis Wooton, both then at the New Mexico College of Agriculture and Mechanical Arts at Las Cruces (now on the campus of New Mexico State University) near Mesilla. She maintained correspondence with Cockerell and other notable botanists for decades afterwards.

== Plant collecting ==
Ellis is known to have collected over 980 plant specimens of at least 345 species, at least a few of which were used to create the formal scientific description and name of that particular taxon of plant. She did not maintain a numbering system and her specimens are spread out over at least fourteen herbaria, and are thus not maintained in a separate collection. These include those at the local University of New Mexico (2 sheets) and the New Mexico State University (75) herbaria, but also the United States National Herbarium and the herbaria of the New York Botanical Gardens and the Missouri Botanical Gardens. Because many of her collections were of very common plants, the majority of these voucher specimens have likely disappeared in the general collections -many millions of sheets by thousands of collectors, and have never been indexed for the database, thus some 80% of her are now 'lost' somewhere, but the specimens which are housed in New Mexican herbaria are indexed and accessible. Almost all, if not all, of her collections were made in the Sandia Mountains in the 1900s to 1910s. As at February 2021 specimens collected by Ellis have been used to help enable 18 recent scientific publications.

The holotype specimens she discovered and collected include Primula ellisiae (a synonym of P. rusbyi), Dodecatheon ellisiae (now D. dentatum subsp. ellisiae) and Astragalus praelongus var. ellisiae. These plants were named in her honour. She also collected the holotypes of Achillea laxiflora (a synonym of A. millefolium) and Tium stenolobum (a synonym of Astragalus scopulorum). She sent an Opuntia specimen she collected in 1910 in the mountains near Placitas to Joseph Nelson Rose.
