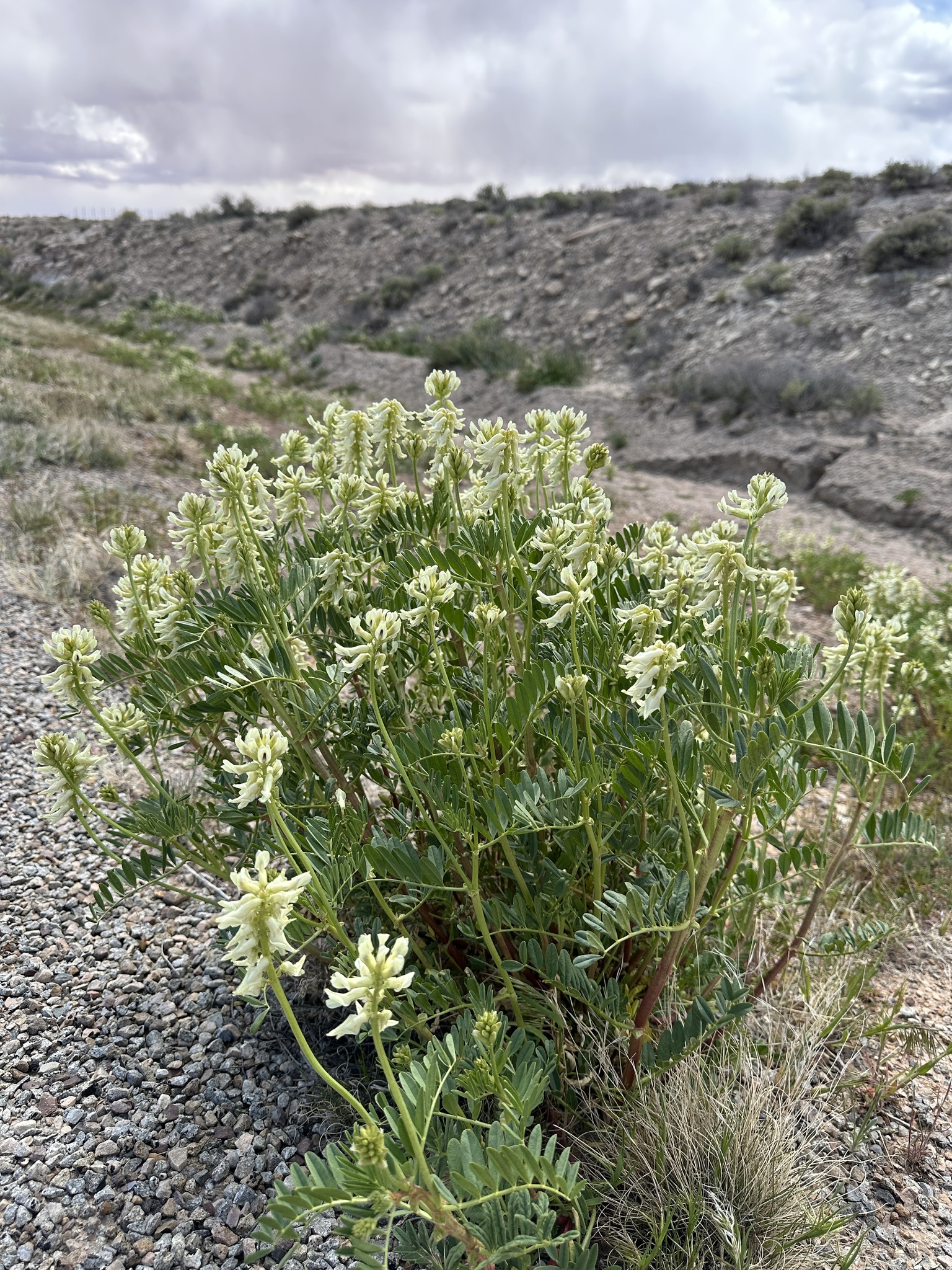
- Astragalus praelongus flowering Emery County, Utah

Conservation status
- Apparently Secure (NatureServe)

Scientific classification
- Kingdom: Plantae
- Clade: Tracheophytes
- Clade: Angiosperms
- Clade: Eudicots
- Clade: Rosids
- Order: Fabales
- Family: Fabaceae
- Subfamily: Faboideae
- Genus: Astragalus
- Species: A. praelongus

Binomial name
- Astragalus praelongus E.Sheld.

= Astragalus praelongus =

Species of legume

Astragalus praelongus (stinking milkvetch) is a perennial plant in the legume family (Fabaceae) found in the Colorado Plateau and Canyonlands region of the southwestern United States. It's fleshy seedpods become woody with age. It grows in soils containing selenium.

A. praelongus var. ellisiae was named for Charlotte Cortlandt Ellis, who collected the holotype specimen in the Sandia Mountains of New Mexico near where she lived.
