= Aulops =

Scientific classification
- Kingdom: Animalia
- Phylum: Arthropoda
- Clade: Pancrustacea
- Class: Insecta
- Order: Mecoptera
- Family: Panorpidae
- Genus: Aulops; Enderlein, 1910

Genus of insects

Aulops is a genus of scorpionflies belonging to the family Panorpidae.

Species:

- Aulops alpina
- Aulops plitvicensis
