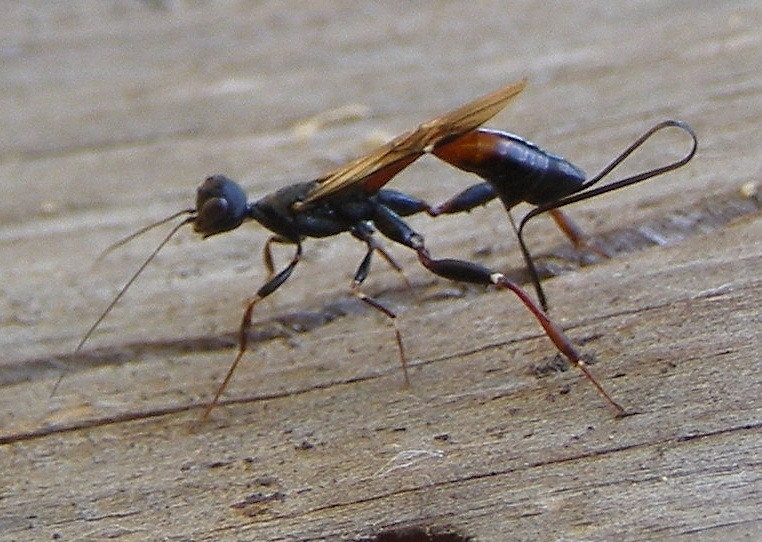
- Stephanus serrator

Scientific classification
- Kingdom: Animalia
- Phylum: Arthropoda
- Clade: Pancrustacea
- Class: Insecta
- Order: Hymenoptera
- Superfamily: Stephanoidea
- Family: Stephanidae; Leach, 1815

Subfamilies
- See text

= Stephanidae =

Stephanidae Temporal range: Cenomanian–Recent

Family of wasps

The Stephanidae, sometimes called crown wasps, are a family of parasitoid wasps. They are the only living members of the superfamily Stephanoidea. Stephanidae has about 365 living species. The family is considered cosmopolitan in distribution, with the highest species concentrations in subtropical and moderate climate zones. Stephanidae also contain four extinct genera described from both compression fossils and inclusions in amber.

== Description ==
Stephanids are noted for their ocellar corona, a semicircular to circular set of projections around the middle ocellus, forming a "crown" on the head. Only stephanids and the similarly old Hymenoptera family Orussidae have ocellar coronae, and it is uncertain if they developed the structure separately or if a common ancestor of both developed it and it was then lost in all but the two families. Weakly developed grooves starting at the base of the antennae and extending past the eyes to the back of the head capsule are present. This feature is seen more developed in hymenopteran families in which the adults emerge from pupal chambers in wood. All genera of Stephanidae have a pronotum that is modified to some extent. They bear highly modified hind legs, with a swollen hind femur that has large teeth on the underside, and the tibiae have a tip end that widens distinctly. The largest species, reaching up to 35 mm (1.4 in) in length, are found in the genus Megischus.

== Biology ==
Stephanids are noted as parasitoids of xylophagous beetle larvae, with a majority of the stephanids hosts coming from the families Cerambycidae and Buprestidae, though some Curculionidae and occasional hymenopteran hosts are taken. One species, Schlettererius cinctipes, is a known parasitoid of horntail wasps and has been introduced to Tasmania as a biological pest control agent. Members of the genus Foenatopus are parasitoids of Agrilus sexsignatus, wood-boring beetle larvae found infesting eucalyptus in the Philippines. The rate of parasitism for an A. sexsignatus population was recorded to vary from only 2% up to 50% of the population.

== Taxonomy and fossil record ==
The family is noted to be the most basal group of hymenopterans in the suborder Apocrita. They are the only living group left over from the early diversification of Apocrita. In general, the family is considered rare, with close to 95% of the species known to have been described from single specimens. Until the early 1800s, members of Stephanidae were grouped into the parasitic wasp superfamily Ichneumonoidea based on the superficial resemblance between some members of the two groups. William Elford Leach suggested a new family grouping for the stephanids in the 1815 edition of Edinburgh Encyclopædia. The name Stephanidae was first published by Alexander Henry Haliday in his 1839 Hymenoptera Britannica. About 110 years later, the stephanids were placed into a separate superfamily, Stephanoidea, by P.L.G. Benoit, along with the proposed family "Stenophasmidae". The latter group was moved out of Stephanoidea in 1969 by Alexandr Pavlovich Rasnitsyn, who transferred the "Stenophasmidae" to the family Braconidae and synonymized the two families.

Fossil specimens related to the family are uncommon, and most are dated to the Tertiary. The oldest confirmed members of the family are Kronostephanus zigrasi, Lagenostephanus lii, and Phoriostephanus exilis all known from the Late Cretaceous (Cenomanian) Burmese amber. Other early member of the family is the monotypic genus Archaeostephanus, which is known from a single species Archaeostephanus corae found in the late Cretaceous New Jersey amber and first described in 2004. The first species to be described from the fossil record was Protostephanus ashmeadi, which was first published in 1906 by paleoentomologist Theodore Dru Alison Cockerell. The specimen is also the youngest fossil found, dating from the Late Eocene Florissant Formation. All other extinct species in the family are known from fossils preserved in Baltic amber. Based on the fossil record of the family, Li et al. (2017) infer that the family originated during the Late Jurassic or Early Cretaceous.

Taxonomy of the family as outlined by Michael S. Engel and Jaime Ortega-Blanco in 2011:

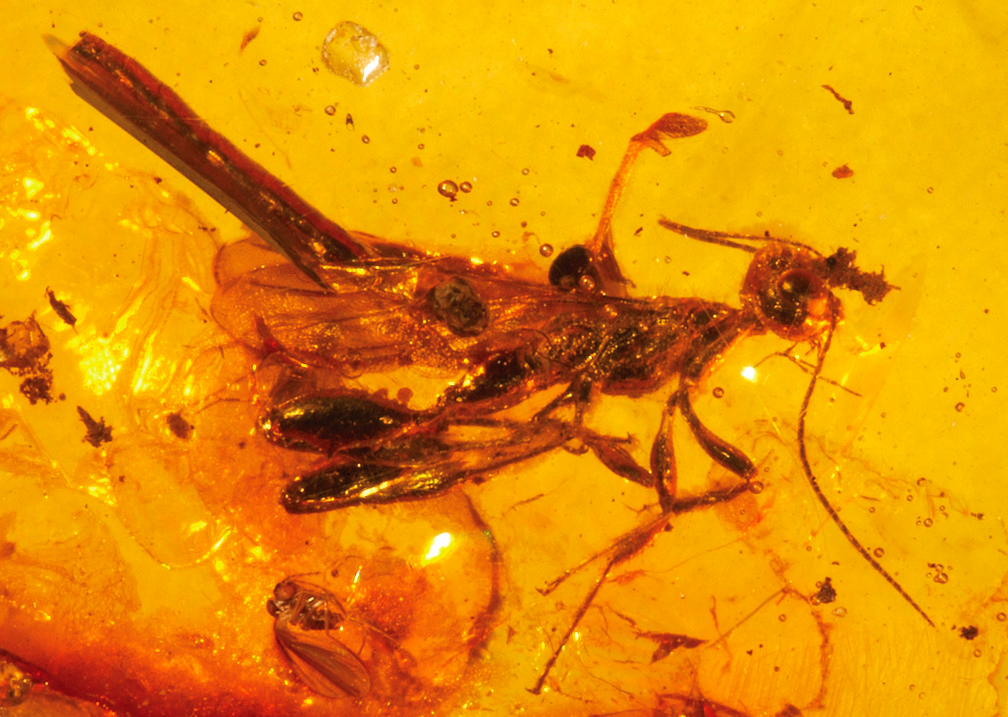
Electrostephanus petiolatus Neotype male

=== Subfamilies and Tribes ===
- Subfamily Schlettereriinae Orfila
  - Tribe †Phoriostephanini Engel & Huang
    - Genus †Phoriostephanus Engel & Huang Burmese amber, Myanmar, Late Cretaceous (Cenomanian)
  - Tribe Schlettereriini Orfila
    - Genus †Archaeostephanus Engel & Grimaldi New Jersey amber, Late Cretaceous (Turonian)
    - Genus †Kronostephanus Engel & Grimaldi Burmese amber, Myanmar, Late Cretaceous (Cenomanian)
    - Genus Schlettererius Ashmead
- Subfamily †Electrostephaninae Engel
  - Genus †Electrostephanus Brues Baltic amber, Eocene
    - Subgenus †Electrostephanodes Engel & Ortega-Blanco
    - Subgenus †Electrostephanus Brues
- Subfamily Stephaninae Leach
  - Tribe incertae sedis
    - Genus †Protostephanus Cockerell Baltic amber, Eocene
    - Genus †Denaeostephanus Engel & Grimaldi Baltic amber, Eocene
    - Genus †Lagenostephanus Li et al. Burmese amber, Myanmar, Late Cretaceous (Cenomanian)
  - Tribe Stephanini Leach
    - Genus Stephanus Jurine
  - Tribe Megischini Engel & Grimaldi
    - Genus Hemistephanus Enderlein
    - Genus Megischus Brullé
    - Genus Pseudomegischus Achterberg
      - Subgenus Pseudomegischus Achterberg
      - Subgenus Callomegischus Achterberg
  - Tribe Foenatopodini Enderlein
    - Subtribe Madegafoenina Engel & Grimaldi
      - Genus Madegafoenus Benoit
      - Genus Afromegischus Achterberg
    - Subtribe Foenatopodina Enderlein
      - Genus Parastephanellus Enderlein
      - Genus Comnatopus Achterberg
      - Genus Profoenatopus Achterberg
      - Genus Foenatopus Smith
