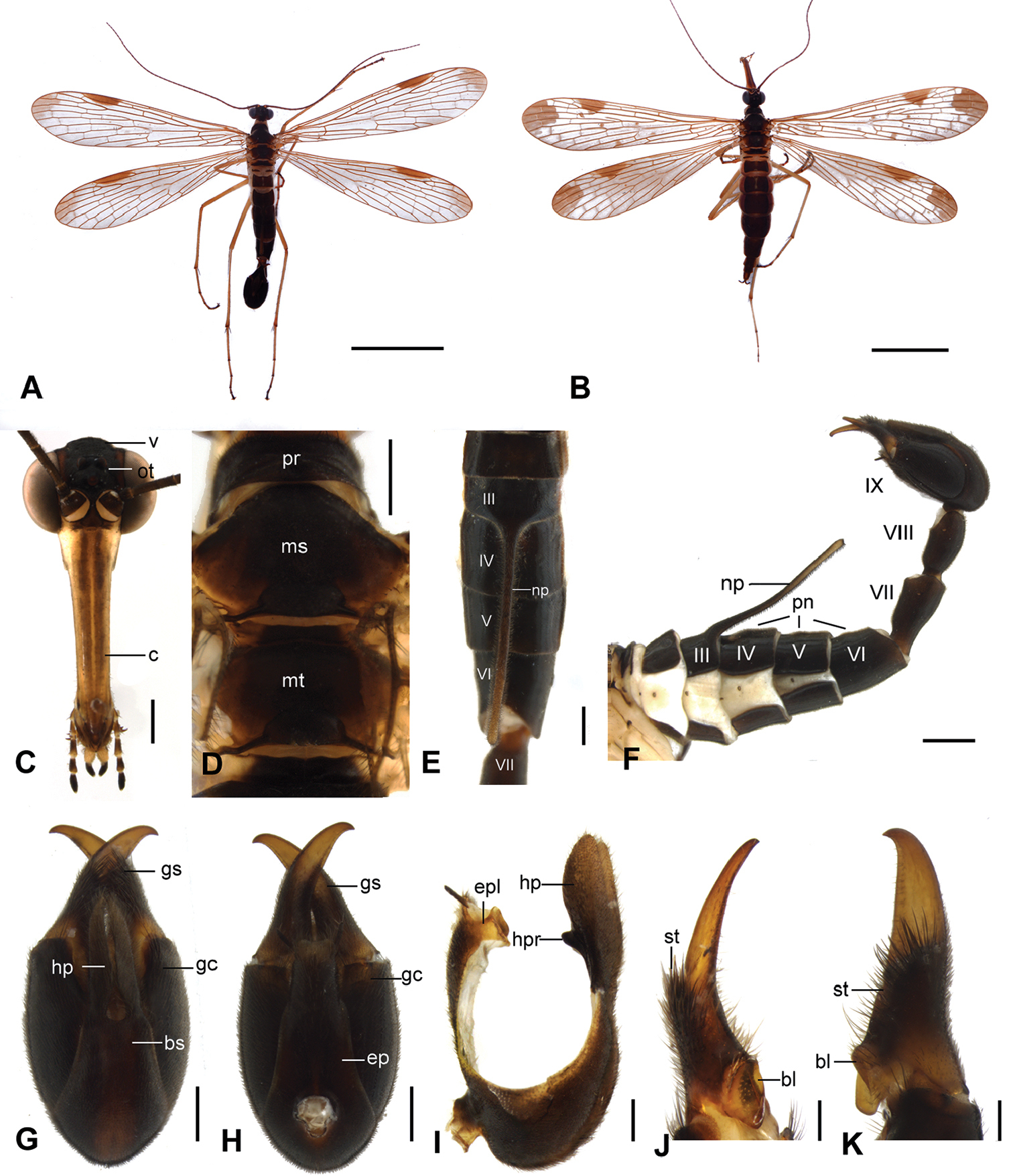
- Neopanorpa setigera

Scientific classification
- Kingdom: Animalia
- Phylum: Arthropoda
- Class: Insecta
- Order: Mecoptera
- Family: Panorpidae
- Genus: Neopanorpa van der Weele, 1909

Species
- See text

= Neopanorpa =

Genus of insects

Neopanorpa is a paraphyletic genus of around 170 species of scorpionfly in Southeast Asia, nesting the genus Leptopanorpa.

== Species ==
This list is adapted from the World Checklist of extant Mecoptera species: Neopanorpa and complete as of 2018.

- Neopanorpa abdida Byers, 1999 (Myanmar)
- Neopanorpa abstrusa Zhou & Wu, 1993 (China: Zhejiang)
- Neopanorpa acetabulifera Bicha, 2015 (Vietnam)
- Neopanorpa anchoroides Zhou, 2003 (China: Guizhou)
- Neopanorpa angustala Bicha, 2015 (Vietnam)
- Neopanorpa angustiapicula Chau & Byers, 1978 (Java)
- Neopanorpa angustipennis (Westwood, 1842) (Burma, Thailand, Malaysia)
- Neopanorpa annamensis Byers, 1965 (Vietnam)
- Neopanorpa apicata Navás, 1922 (China: Guizhou)
- Neopanorpa arcuatan Bicha, 2019 (Thailand)
- Neopanorpa auriculata Zhou, 2005 (China: Guizhou)
- Neopanorpa auripennisn Bicha, 2019 (Thailand)
- Neopanorpa appendiculata (Westwood, 1846) (India)
- Neopanorpa babai Miyamoto, 1994 (Taiwan)
- Neopanorpa banksi Carpenter, 1938 (China: Sichuan)
- Neopanorpa baviensis Cheng, 1953 (Vietnam)
- Neopanorpa benaci Navás, 1935 (India)
- Neopanorpa breviramus Byers, 1999 (Myanmar: Kachin)
- Neopanorpa borneensis Byers, 1966 (Malaysia: Sabah)
- Neopanorpa brevivalvae Chou & Wang, 1988 (China: Hunan)
- Neopanorpa brisi (Navás, 1930) (China: Sichuan, Yunnan)
- Neopanorpa burmana Byers, 1965 (Myanmar)
- Neopanorpa byersi Webb & Penny, 1979 (Thailand)
- Neopanorpa cangshanensis Zhou, 2006 (China: Guizhou)
- Neopanorpa cantonensis Cheng, 1957 (China: Guangdong)
- Neopanorpa carpenteri Cheng, 1957 (China: Guangdong)
- Neopanorpa cavaleriei (Navás, 1908) (China: Guizhou)
- Neopanorpa caveata Cheng, 1957 (China: Fujian)
- Neopanorpa chaohsiufui Wang % Hua, 2017 (China: Guizhou)
- Neopanorpa chaoi Cheng, 1957 (China: Fujian)
- Neopanorpa chelata Carpenter, 1938 (China: Sichuan)
- Neopanorpa chillcotti Byers, 1971 (Nepal)
- Neopanorpa choui Cheng, 1949 (China: Sichuan)
- Neopanorpa clara Chou & Wang, 1988 (China: Hunan)
- Neopanorpa claripennis Carpenter, 1938 (China: Sichuan)
- Neopanorpa clavata Byers, 1999 (Myanmar: Kachin)
- Neopanorpa contracta Cheng, 1953 (India)
- Neopanorpa cornuta Esben-Petersen, 1915 (India)
- Neopanorpa cucullata Bicha, 2017 (Vietnam)
- Neopanorpa curva Zhou, 2000 (China: Yunnan)
- Neopanorpa crinita Chau & Byers, 1978 (Sumatra)
- Neopanorpa cuspidata Byers, 1965 (Thailand)
- Neopanorpa denticulata Rust & Byers, 1976 (India)
- Neopanorpa diancangshanensis Wang & Hua, 2018 (Myanmar)
- Neopanorpa diloba Chau & Byers 1978 (Java)
- Neopanorpa dispar Issiki & Cheng 1947 (Taiwan)
- Neopanorpa dorsalis Byers 1965 (Vietnam)
- Neopanorpa dubis Chou & Wang 1988 (China: Hunan)
- Neopanorpa echinata Rust & Byers 1976 (India)
- Neopanorpa echinodes Byers, 1999 (Myanmar: Kachin)
- Neopanorpa effusa (Navás, 1914) (India: Sikkim, Bhutan)
- Neopanorpa ellengreeni Bicha, 2017 (Vietnam)
- Neopanorpa fangxianga Zhou & Zhou, 2007 (China: Guizhou)
- Neopanorpa fenestrata (Needham, 1909) (India)
- Neopanorpa fimbriata Byers, 1999 (Myanmar: Kachin)
- Neopanorpa flava Esben-Petersen, 1915 (India: Sikkim)
- Neopanorpa flavicauda Banks, 1931 (Malaysia: Sabah)
- Neopanorpa formosana (Navás, 1911) (Taiwan)
- Neopanorpa formosensis Navás, 1930 (Taiwan)
- Neopanorpa fractura Chau & Byers, 1978 (Sumatra)
- Neopanorpa furcata (Hardwicke, 1825) (Nepal)
- Neopanorpa furcata Zhou, 2005 (China: Guizhou) (unresolved homonymy to Neopanorpa furcata (Hardwicke, 1825))
- Neopanorpa fuscicauda Chau & Byers, 1978 (Java)
- Neopanorpa gestroi Navás, 1929 (Myanmar)
- Neopanorpa gibbosa Rust & Byers, 1976 (India)
- Neopanorpa globulifera Byers, 1982 (Laos)
- Neopanorpa gradana Cheng, 1952 (Taiwan)
- Neopanorpa gulinensis Zhou & Zhou, 2005 (China: Guizhou)
- Neopanorpa hainanica Hua & Chou, 1998 (China: Hainan)
- Neopanorpa harmandi (Navás, 1908) (Thailand, Vietnam)

- Neopanorpa harmandi conjuncta Navás, 1930 (Thailand)

- Neopanorpa hei Zhou & Fan, 1998 (China: Zhejiang)
- Neopanorpa heii Cheng, 1949 (China: Sichuan)
- Neopanorpa hirsuta (Crampton, 1931) (India)
- Neopanorpa hualizhongi Hua & Chou, 1998 (China: Hainan, Guangxi)
- Neopanorpa huangshana Cheng, 1957 (China: Anhui)
- Neopanorpa hunanensis Hua, 2002 (China: Hunan, Guangxi, Guangdong)
- Neopanorpa hushengchangi Hua & Chou, 1999 (Taiwan)
- Neopanorpa hyalinata Esben-Petersen, 1913 (Java)
- Neopanorpa indica Rust & Byers, 1976 (India)
- Neopanorpa infuscata Banks, 1931 (Malaysia (Perak, Pahang), Thailand)
- Neopanorpa jigongshanensis Hua, 1998 (Taiwan)
- Neopanorpa k-maculata Cheng, 1952 (Taiwan)
- Neopanorpa kwangtsehi Cheng, 1957 (China: Fujian)
- Neopanorpa lacunaris Navás, 1930 (China: Yunnan)
- Neopanorpa latipennis Cheng, 1949 (China: Sichuan)
- Neopanorpa leigongshana Zhou & Zhou, 2007 (China: Guizhou)
- Neopanorpa lichuanensis Cheng, 1957 (China: Hubei)
- Neopanorpa lifashengi Hua & Chou, 1999 (China: Tibet)
- Neopanorpa lindsleyi Bicha, 2015 (Vietnam)
- Neopanorpa linjiangensis Zhou, 2005 (China: Guizhou)
- Neopanorpa lipingensis Cai & Hua, 2009 (China: Shaanxi)
- Neopanorpa liquifascia Byers, 1999 (Myanmar: Kachin)
- Neopanorpa lieftincki Chau & Byers, 1978 (Sumatra)
- Neopanorpa linguata Navás, 1914 (Java, Sumatra)
- Neopanorpa longiprocessa Hua & Chou, 1997 (China: Henan)
- Neopanorpa longistipitata Wang & Hua, 2018 (China: Yunnan)
- Neopanorpa lui Chou & Ran, 1981 (China: Shaanxi, Gansu)
- Neopanorpa lungtausana Cheng, 1957 (China: Guangdong)
- Neopanorpa maai Cheng, 1957 (China: Fujian)
- Neopanorpa magna Issiki, 1927 (Taiwan)
- Neopanorpa magnatitilana Wang & Hua, 2018 (China: Yunnan)
- Neopanorpa makii Issiki, 1927 (Taiwan)
- Neopanorpa malaisei Byers, 1999 (Myanmar: Kachin)
- Neopanorpa mangshanensis Chou & Wang, 1988 (China: Hunan)
- Neopanorpa maolanensis Zhou & Bao, 2002 (China: Guizhou)
- Neopanorpa mayangensis Zhou & Zhou, 2010 (China: Guizhou)
- Neopanorpa menghaiensis Zhou & Wu, 1993 (China: Yunnan)
- Neopanorpa minuta Chou & Wang, 1988 (China: Hunan)
- Neopanorpa moganshanensis Zhou & Wu, 1993 (China: Zhejiang)
- Neopanorpa mokansana Cheng, 1957 (China: Zhejiang)
- Neopanorpa montana Zhou, 1993 (China: Zhejiang)
- Neopanorpa mulleri (van der Weele, 1909) (Java)
- Neopanorpa mutabilis Cheng, 1957 (China: Fujian)
- Neopanorpa nielseni Byers, 1965 (Vietnam)
- Neopanorpa nigritis Carpenter, 1938 (China: Sichuan)
- Neopanorpa nipalica (Navás, 1910) (Nepal, India)
- Neopanorpa normpennyin Bicha, 2019 (Thailand)
- Neopanorpa obscura Byers, 1999 (Myanmar: Kachin)
- Neopanorpa ophthalmica (Navás, 1911) (Taiwan)
- Neopanorpa ocellaris (Navás, 1908) (India: Sikkim)
- Neopanorpa ochrura Rust & Byers, 1976 (India)
- Neopanorpa ornata Byers, 1965 (Vietnam)
- Neopanorpa ovata Cheng, 1957 (China: Fujian)
- Neopanorpa pallivalva Zhou, 2003 (China: Guizhou)
- Neopanorpa panda Byers, 1965 (Vietnam)
- Neopanorpa parva Carpenter, 1945 (China: Sichuan)
- Neopanorpa parvula Willmann, 1976 (Vietnam)
- Neopanorpa pendula Qian & Zhou, 2001 (China: Yunnan)
- Neopanorpa pendulifera Byers, 1965 (Thailand)
- Neopanorpa pennyi Byers, 1999 (Myanmar: Kachin)
- Neopanorpa pielina Navás, 1936 (China: Jiangxi)
- Neopanorpa pulchra Carpenter, 1945 (China: Hainan Island)
- Neopanorpa puripennis Chou & Wang, 1988 (China: Hunan)
- Neopanorpa ramulata Byers, 1975 (Bhutan)
- Neopanorpa retina Chou & Li, 1988 (China: Hunan)
- Neopanorpa salai Navás, 1929 (India)
- Neopanorpa sauteri (Esben-Petersen, 1912) (Taiwan)
- Neopanorpa semiorbiculata Wang & Hua, 2018 (China: Yunnan)
- Neopanorpa setigera Wang & Hua, 2018 (China: Sichuan)
- Neopanorpa sheni Hua & Chou, 1997 (China: Henan)
- Neopanorpa siamensis Byers, 1965 (Thailand)
- Neopanorpa similis Byers, 1999 (Myanmar: Kachin)
- Neopanorpa simulans Byers, 2008 (Taiwan)
- Neopanorpa sordida (Needham, 1909) (India)
- Neopanorpa spatulata Byers, 1965 (Thailand)
- Neopanorpa spicata Byers, 1966 (Malaysia: Sabah)
- Neopanorpa subreticulata Miyamoto & Makihara, 1979 (Japan)
- Neopanorpa sumatrana Chau & Byers, 1978 (Sumatra)
- Neopanorpa taoi Cheng, 1949 (China: Sichuan)
- Neopanorpa tengchongensis Zhou & Wu, 1993 (China: Yunnan)
- Neopanorpa tenuis Zhou, 2000 (China: Yunnan)
- Neopanorpa terminata Byers, 1999 (Myanmar: Kachin)
- Neopanorpa thai Byers, 1965 (Thailand)
- Neopanorpa tibetensis Hua & Chou, 1999 (China: Tibet)
- Neopanorpa tienmushana Cheng, 1957 (China: Zhejiang)
- Neopanorpa tienpingshana Chou & Wang, 1988 (China)
- Neopanorpa tincta Wang & Hua, 2018 (China: Yunnan)
- Neopanorpa tiomanensis Byers, 1966 (Malaysia: Tioman Island)
- Neopanorpa translucida Cheng, 1957 (China: Fujian)
- Neopanorpa triangulata Wang & Hua, 2018 (China: Yunnan)
- Neopanorpa tuberosa Byers 1965 (Thailand)
- Neopanorpa umbonata Chau & Byers, 1978 (Sumatra)
- Neopanorpa uncataZhou, 2000 (China: Yunnan)
- Neopanorpa uncinella Qian & Zhou, 2001 (China: Yunnan)
- Neopanorpa validipennis Cheng, 1949 (China: Sichaun)
- Neopanorpa varia Cheng, 1949 (China: Sichuan)
- Neopanorpa vittata Byers, 1999 (Myanmar: Kachin)
- Neopanorpa vietnamensis Willman, 1976 (Vietnam)
- Neopanorpa wangcaensis Zhou & Zhou, 2012 (China: Guizhou)
- Neopanorpa xishuiensis Zhou, 2005 (China: Guizhou)
- Neopanorpa yingjiangensis Zhou, 2000 (China: Yunnan)
- Neopanorpa youngi Byers, 1994 (Taiwan)
- Neopanorpa zebrata Esben-Petersen, 1915 (India)
