= Theodore D. A. Cockerell =

American entomologist (1866–1948)

Theodore Dru Alison Cockerell
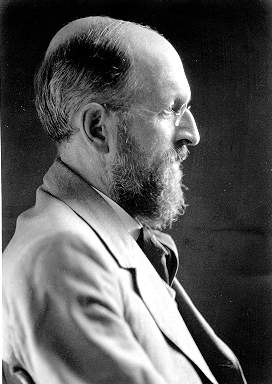
- Cockerell in the 1930s
- Born: 22 August 1866; West Norwood, London, England
- Died: 26 January 1948 (aged 81); San Diego, California, US
- Resting place: Columbia Cemetery, Boulder, Colorado, US
- Citizenship: United States; UK
- Education: Middlesex Hospital Medical School
- Spouses: Annie Fenn Cockerell, Wilmatte Porter Cockerell
- Relatives: Douglas Cockerell and Sydney Cockerell, brothers
- Scientific career
- Fields: Entomology, systematic biology
- Workplaces: New Mexico Agricultural Experiment Station, New Mexico Normal University, University of Colorado, University of Colorado Museum of Natural History
- Notable students: Charlotte Cortlandt Ellis
- Author abbrev. (botany): Cockerell
- Author abbrev. (zoology): Ckll.

Theodore Dru Alison Cockerell (22 August 1866 – 26 January 1948) was a British and American entomologist and systematic biologist who published nearly 4,000 papers, some of them only a few lines long. Cockerell's speciality was the insect order Hymenoptera (bees and wasps), an area of study where he described specimens from the United States, the West Indies, Honduras, the Philippines, Africa, and Asia. Cockerell named at least 5,500 species and varieties of bees and almost 150 genera and subgenera, representing over a quarter of all species of bees known during his lifetime. In addition to his extensive studies of bees, he published papers on scale insects, slugs, moths, fish scales, fungi, roses and other flowers, mollusks, and a wide variety of other plants and animals.

== Personal life ==
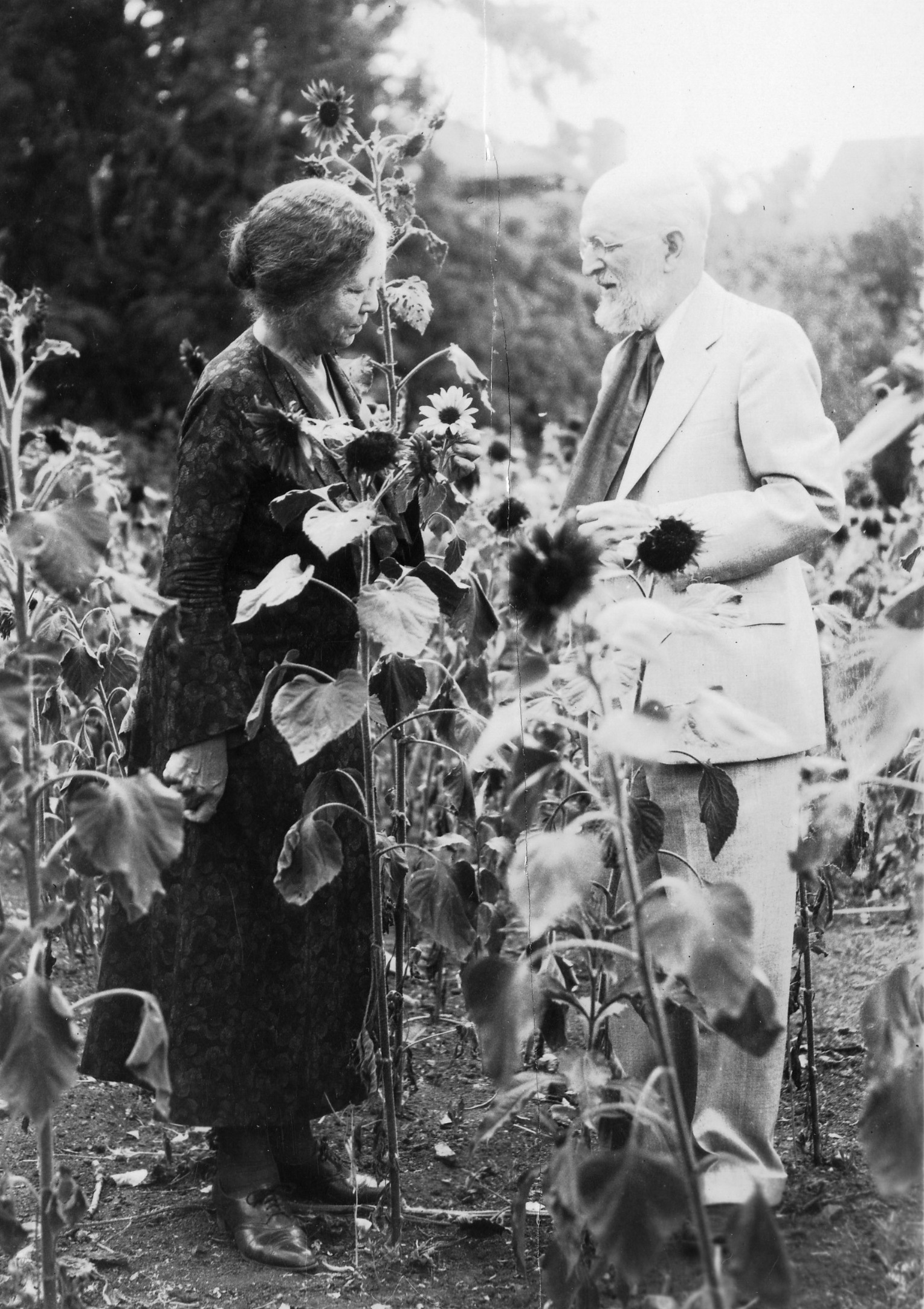
Cockerell with his wife Wilmatte Porter Cockerell, 1935

Cockerell was born in Norwood, Greater London, the eldest son of Sydney John Cockerell (1842–1877) and Alice Elizabeth (née Bennett). Sydney Cockerell, who became director of the Fitzwilliam Museum, was a younger brother, Douglas Cockerell was another of his brothers and Olive Juliet was one of his sisters.

He married Annie Sarah Fenn in 1891 (she died in 1893) and Wilmatte Porter in 1900. In 1901, he named the ultramarine blue chromodorid Mexichromis porterae (now Felimare porterae) in her honor. After their marriage in 1900, they frequently went on collecting expeditions together and assembled a large private library of natural history films, which they showed to schoolchildren and public audiences to promote the cause of environmental conservation.

He died in 1948 in San Diego, California, aged 81, and was buried in Columbia Cemetery in Boulder, Colorado.

== Professional life ==
Between 1891 and 1901, Cockerell was the curator of the public museum of Kingston, Jamaica, professor of entomology of the New Mexico Agricultural Experiment Station. In 1900–03, he was an instructor in biology at the New Mexico Normal School. While there, he taught and mentored Charlotte Cortlandt Ellis.

In 1904, Cockerell became the curator of the Colorado College Museum and a lecturer on entomology. In 1906 he became a professor of systematic zoology at the University of Colorado where he worked with Junius Henderson in establishing the University of Colorado Museum of Natural History. During World War II, he operated the Desert Museum in Palm Springs, California.

== Publications ==
Cockerell was author of more than 2,200 articles in scientific publications, especially on the Hymenoptera, Hemiptera and Mollusca, and on paleontology and various phases of evolution, plus some 1,700 other works, including treatises on social reform and education. He was one of the most prolific taxonomists in history, publishing descriptions of over 9,000 species and genera of insects alone, some 6,400 of which were bees and some 1,000 mollusks, arachnids, fungi, mammals, fish and plants.

This includes descriptions of numerous fossil taxa, such as the landmark study, Some Fossil Insects from Florissant, Colorado (1913). The standard author abbreviation Cockerell is used to indicate this person as the author when citing a botanical name. In an obituary note that appeared in the Nature on 14 February 1948, R.B. Benson observed that Cockerell "acquired the habit of hurrying his ideas and observations into print as soon as he could. The habit persisted throughout his long life, so that almost all his work appeared in the form of short papers".

== Plants ==
Cockerell and Wilmatte traveled to the United Kingdom in 1921. While there, they visited the Royal Botanic Garden Edinburgh where, according to himself in 1937, Isaac Bayley Balfour proved that the plant Primula ellisiae was a distinct species from P. rusbyi. He had named this taxon in honor of its discoverer, one of his students, Charlotte Cortlandt Ellis. However, at present this taxon is regarded as a synonym of P. rusbyi.

== Honors ==
Cockerell was elected to the American Philosophical Society in 1928. A dormitory in the Engineering Quad at the University of Colorado at Boulder and the moth Givira theodori are named in his honor.

== Taxa ==
Taxa named by Cockerell include:

Name	Year	Unit	Location	Notes	Images
Anthidium exhumatum	1906	Florissant Formation	United States	A mason bee	
Anthidium scudderi	1906	Florissant Formation	United States	A mason bee	
Archimyrmex rostratus	1923	Green River Formation	United States	A myrmeciine ant	
Elisolimax	1893	Extant		a land slug genus	
Dinopanorpa megarche	1924	Khutsin Formation	Russia	A scorpion fly	
Hydriomena? protrita	1922	Florissant Formation	United States	A butterfly	Hydriomena? protrita
Protostephanus ashmeadi	1906	Florissant Formation	A crown wasp		
Palaeovespa	1906	Baltic amber & Florissant Formation, Colorado	Europe; United States	An Eocene wasp genus	Palaeovespa florissantia
Tortrix? destructus	1917	Florissant Formation	United States	A moth, moved to Paleolepidopterites destructus	Paleolepidopterites destructus
Tortrix? florissantanus	1907	Florissant Formation	United States	A moth, moved to Paleolepidopterites florissantanus	Paleolepidopterites florissantanus
Trigona corvina	1913	Extant	Central America & South America	A stingless bee	
