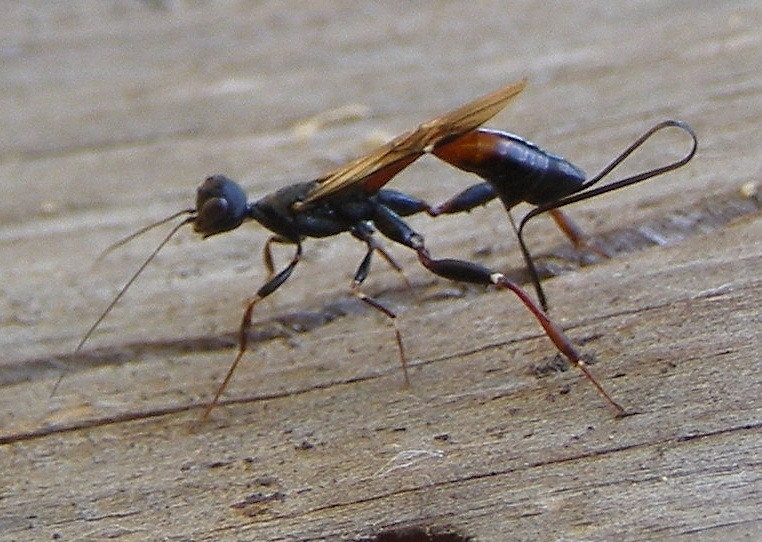
- Stephanus serrator

Scientific classification
- Kingdom: Animalia
- Phylum: Arthropoda
- Class: Insecta
- Order: Hymenoptera
- Family: Stephanidae
- Genus: Stephanus; Jurine (in Panzer), 1801

Type species
- Stephanus coronatus Jurine (in Panzer), 1801

= Stephanus (wasp) =

Genus of wasps

Stephanus is a genus of parasitoid wasps in the family Stephanidae. Records of species are from Europe and Asia.

== Species ==
There are 6 species of Stephanus:

- Stephanus anijimensis Watanabe & van Achterberg, 2014
- Stephanus bidentatus van Achterberg & Yang, 2004
- Stephanus borneensis (de Saussure, 1901)
- Stephanus serrator Fabricius, 1798
- Stephanus soror Achterberg, 2002
- Stephanus tridentatus van Achterberg & Yang, 2004
