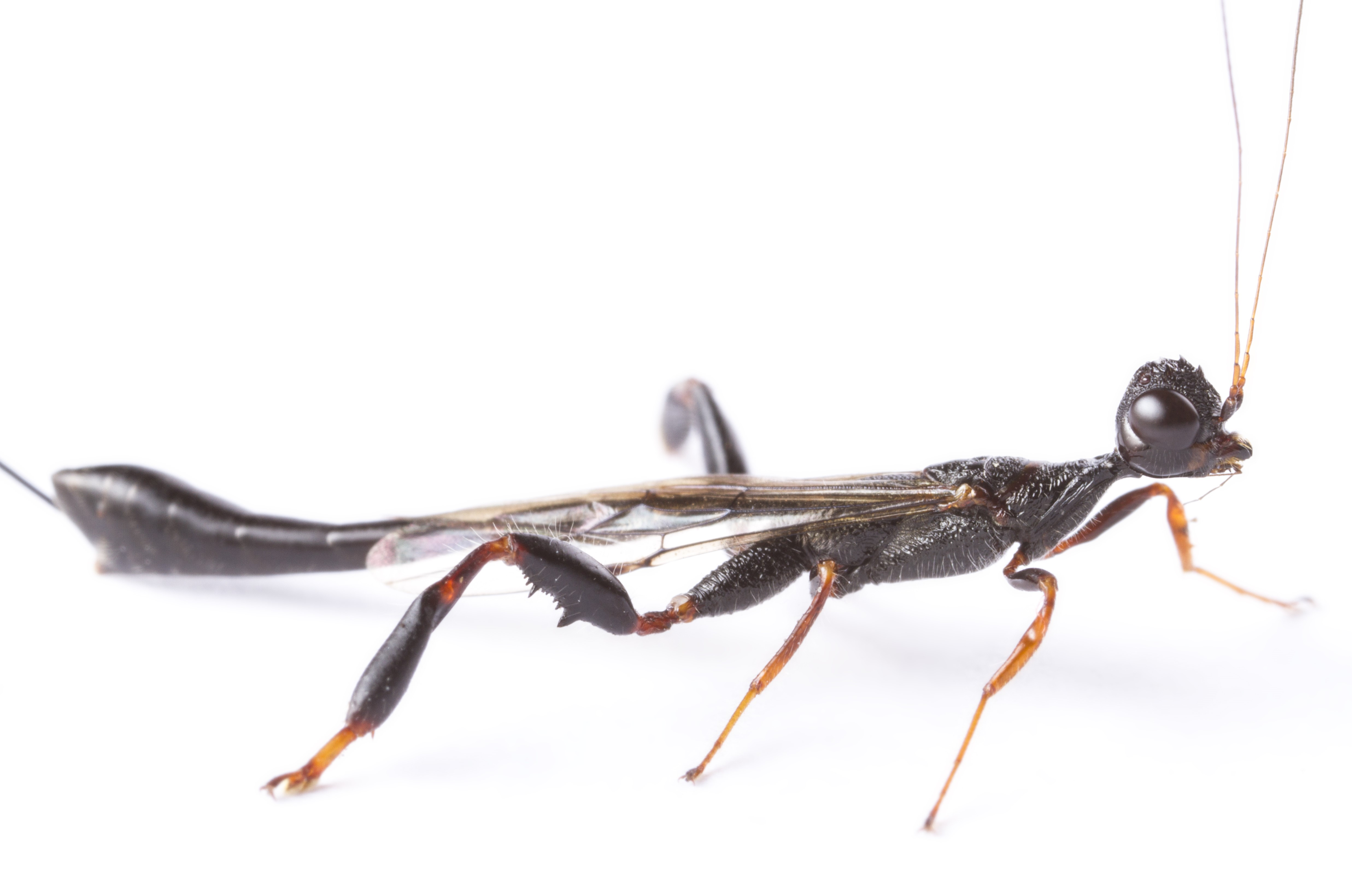
- M. bicolor

Scientific classification
- Kingdom: Animalia
- Phylum: Arthropoda
- Class: Insecta
- Order: Hymenoptera
- Family: Stephanidae
- Tribe: Megischini
- Genus: Megischus; Brullé, 1846

Type species
- Megischus annulator Brullé, 1846

Synonyms
- Bothriocerus Sichel, 1860

= Megischus =

Genus of insects

Megischus is a genus of crown-wasps in the parasitoid family Stephanidae. There are over 90 species globally distributed throughout the Neotropical, Palearctic, Afrotropical, Oriental, Australasian, and Oceanian zoogeographical regions.

Members of the family Stephanidae are notorious for their distinct “crown” composed of 5 spike-shaped tubercles on the head. The Megischus genus can be distinguished from other genera in Stephanidae by transversely depressed hind tibia and the absence of setae on the M+Cu1 vein. Adult individuals of this species can reach up to 40 millimeters in length. Females possess an ovipositor that exceeds their body length and is used to lay eggs in species of wood-boring beetle families including Buprestidae (Jewel Beetles), Cerambycidae (Longhorned Beetles), and Curculionidae (True Weevils). Due to their specialized parasitic lifestyle, Megischus plays a critical role in regulating the wood-boring beetle population, which can be pests for species of hardwood trees and other vegetation worldwide. In addition to beetles, some species in Megischus are parasitoids of Hymenopteran species that include species of Siricidae and solitary Apoidea.

== Taxonomy ==
Megischus is a genus of crown wasp. It was circumscribed by Gaspard Auguste Brullé in 1846. The genus has a cosmopolitan distribution, and over ninety species are recognized. It is the type genus of the tribe Megischini, subfamily Stephaninae, family Stephanidae; the other genera in this tribe are Hemistephanus and Pseudomegischus.

== Description & Etymology ==
Members of the family Stephanidae have a distinct “crown” composed of 5 spike-shaped tubercles on the head. The Megischus genus can be distinguished from other genera in Stephanidae by transversely depressed hind tibia and the absence of setae on the M+Cu1 vein.

Adults are typically a black or brown color and can range from approximately 10–30 mm long depending on the species (and excluding the ovipositor), with males slightly larger than females in size.

The name “Megischus” is derived from the Greek word suffix mega meaning large and the word ischi for hip joint.

== Identification Characteristics ==
Other characteristics to identify Megischus include:

- Sub-spherical head with a crown of tubercles
- Filiform antennae, not elbowed, typically with numerous divisions (12-44)
- Metasoma petiole very long, inserted in a lower area between the hind coxae
- Wide and toothed hind femur on its ventral margin
- Long ovipositor, typically slightly longer than the body (only present in females)
- Anterior wings without a costal cell, or if present, very narrow
- At most with 3 cubital cells where the last one (c3) is open
- Tarsi without plantar lobes

== Natural history ==
=== Life Cycle & Behavior ===
Specimens of Megischus are significantly more likely to be found during the summer with peak appearances occurring at the 26th week of the year. Megischus are ectoparasitoids that play a critical role in regulating the wood-boring beetle population, which can be pests for species of hardwood trees and other vegetation worldwide. Adult females spend hours boring their ovipositors into wood to lay their eggs onto host larvae inside the wood. Members of the genus often target wood-boring beetle families including Buprestidae (Jewel Beetles), Cerambycidae (Longhorned Beetles), and Curculionidae (True Weevils). The female has chemosensors and a chordotonal organ to detect vibrations in order to determine a suitable host where she can lay her eggs. After developing, emerging adults chew their way out of the wood. Interestingly, males emerge several days before females. They are diurnal.

=== Habitat ===
The distribution of Megischus largely mimics the distribution of hardwood trees, including oak, pine, mesquite, mangrove, and a variety of other groups that host wood-bearing Coleopteran families.

=== Historic & Current Distribution ===
There are over 90 species globally distributed throughout the Neotropical, Paleartic, Afrotropical, Oriental, and Australasian and Oceanian zoogeographical regions. The majority of species of Megischus can be found in the Neotropical and Oriental regions.

=== Conservation status ===
Megischus is not considered endangered or at risk. However, more research is necessary to assess the conservation status of all species, given the global distribution and large diversity of the genus.
