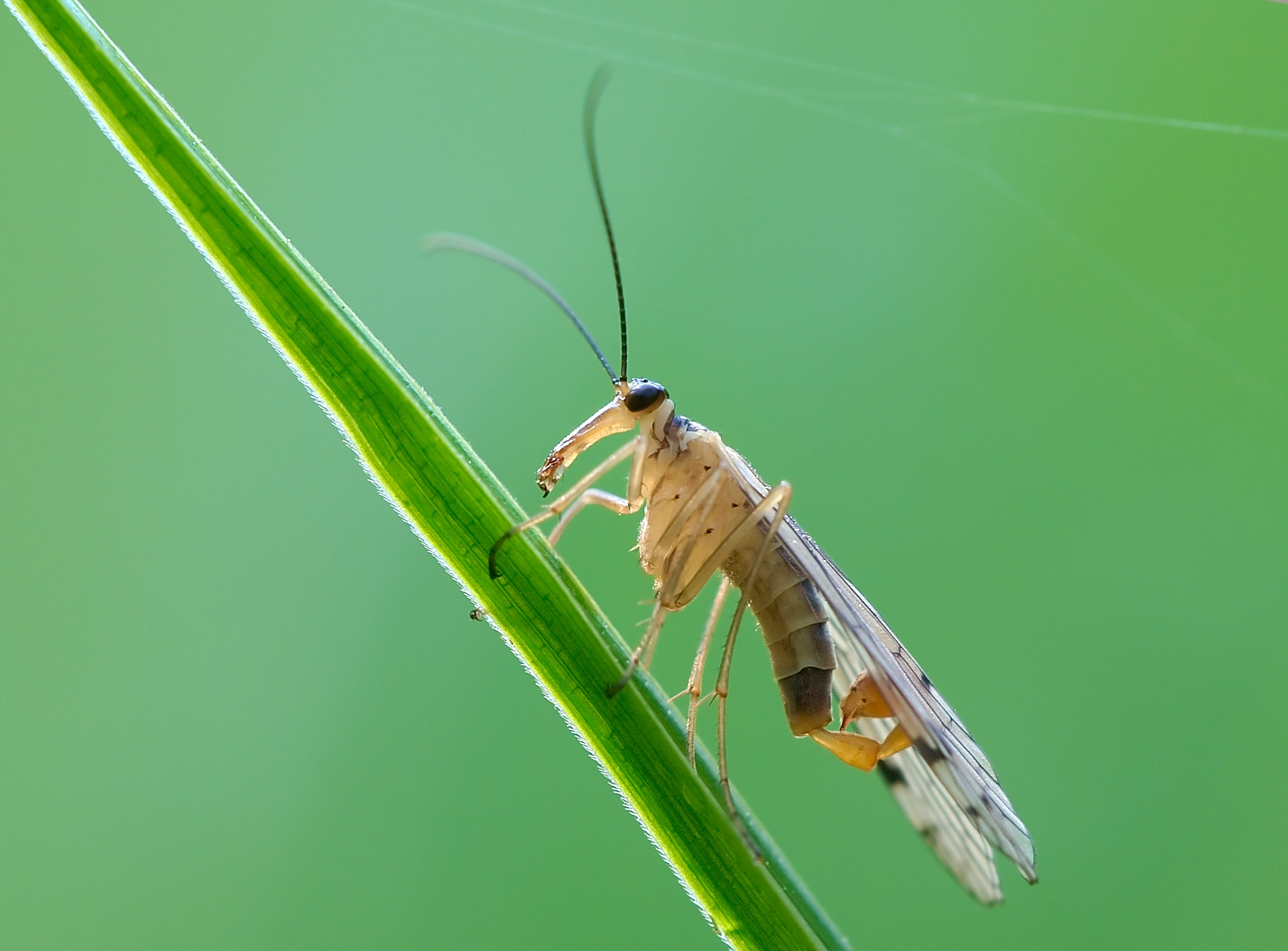
- Panorpa alpina male

Scientific classification
- Domain: Eukaryota
- Kingdom: Animalia
- Phylum: Arthropoda
- Class: Insecta
- Order: Mecoptera
- Superfamily: Panorpoidea
- Family: Panorpidae

Genera
- See text

= Panorpidae =

Panorpidae Temporal range: Eocene–Recent

Family of insects

The Panorpidae are a family of scorpionflies containing more than 480 species. The family is the largest family in Mecoptera, covering approximately 70% species of the order. Species range between 9–25 mm long.

These insects have four membranous wings and threadlike antennae. Their elongated faces terminate with mouthparts that are used to feed on dead and dying insects, nectar, and rotting fruit. While in larval form, they scavenge by consuming dead insects on the ground.

== Genera ==
- Aulops Enderlein, 1910 (two species)
- Cerapanorpa Gao, Ma & Hua, 2016 (22 species)
- Dicerapanorpa Zhong & Hua, 2013 (eight species)
- Furcatopanorpa Ma & Hua, 2011 (one species)
- Leptopanorpa MacLachlan, 1875 (12 species)
- Neopanorpa Weele, 1909 (ca. 170 species)
- Panorpa Linnaeus, 1758 (ca. 260 species)
- Sinopanorpa Cai & Hua in Cai, Huang & Hua, 2008 (three species)

=== Extinct genera ===
- †Baltipanorpa Krzemiński & Soszyńska-Maj, 2012 Baltic amber, Eocene

== Fossil record ==
The oldest known species was previously suggested to be Jurassipanorpa from the Jiulongshan Formation of Inner Mongolia, China. However, this was later considered an incorrect attribution, making the oldest known records of the family currently from the Eocene, including the extinct genus Baltipanorpa as well as the living genus Panorpa.
