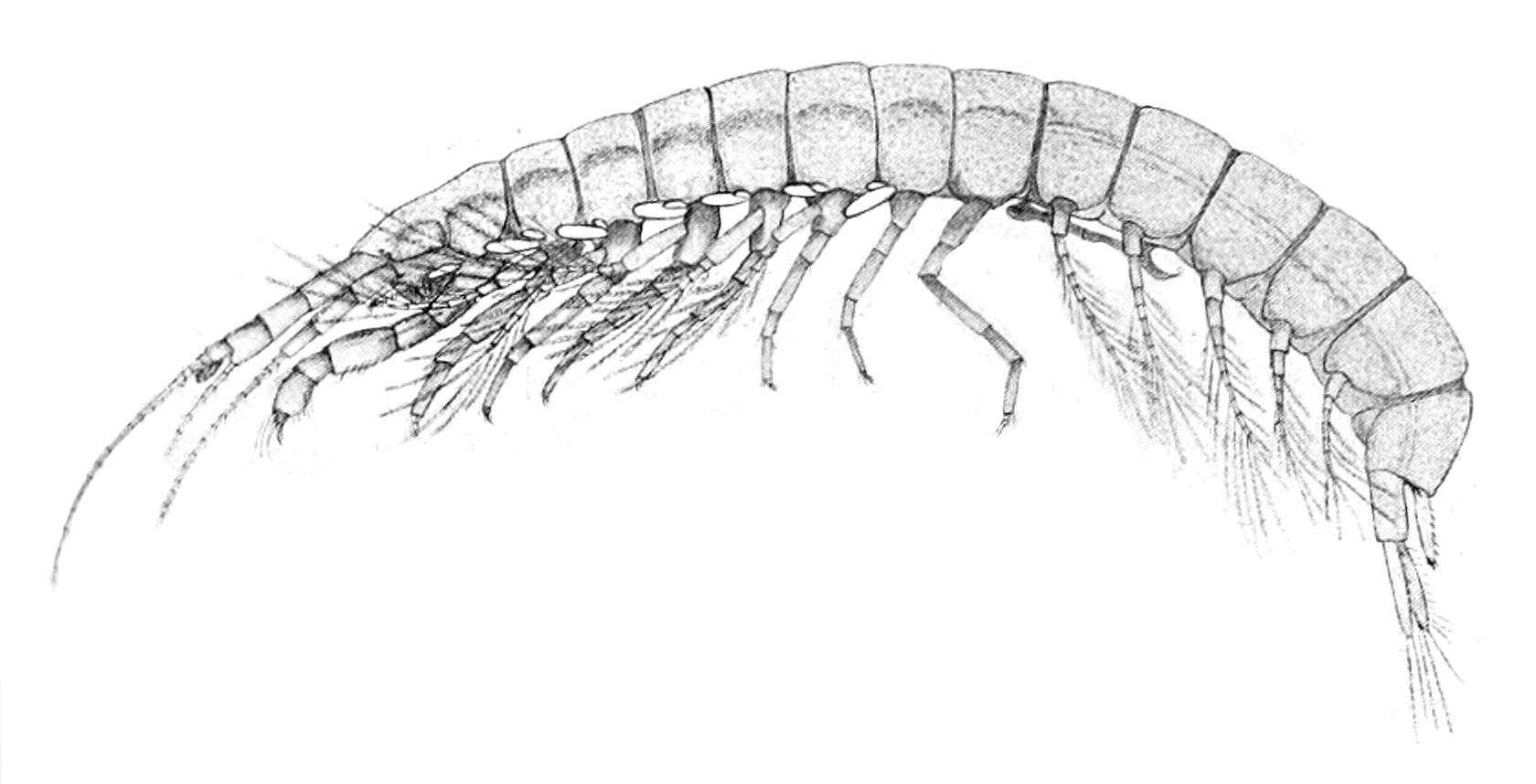
- Koonunga cursor

Scientific classification
- Kingdom: Animalia
- Phylum: Arthropoda
- Class: Malacostraca
- Subclass: Eumalacostraca
- Superorder: Syncarida; Packard, 1885

Orders
- Anaspidacea Calman, 1904; Bathynellacea Chappuis, 1915; †Palaeocaridacea Brooks. 1979

= Syncarida =

Superorder of crustaceans

Syncarida is a superorder of crustaceans, comprising the two extant orders Anaspidacea and Bathynellacea, and the extinct order Palaeocaridacea.

== Taxonomy ==
Fifty-nine living genera are known, in six families:

Anaspidacea Calman, 1904

- Anaspidesidae Ahyong & Alonso-Zarazaga, 2017
- Koonungidae Sayce, 1908
- Psammaspididae Schminke, 1974
- Stygocarididae Noodt, 1963

Bathynellacea Chappuis, 1915

- Bathynellidae Grobben, 1904
- Parabathynellidae Noodt, 1965

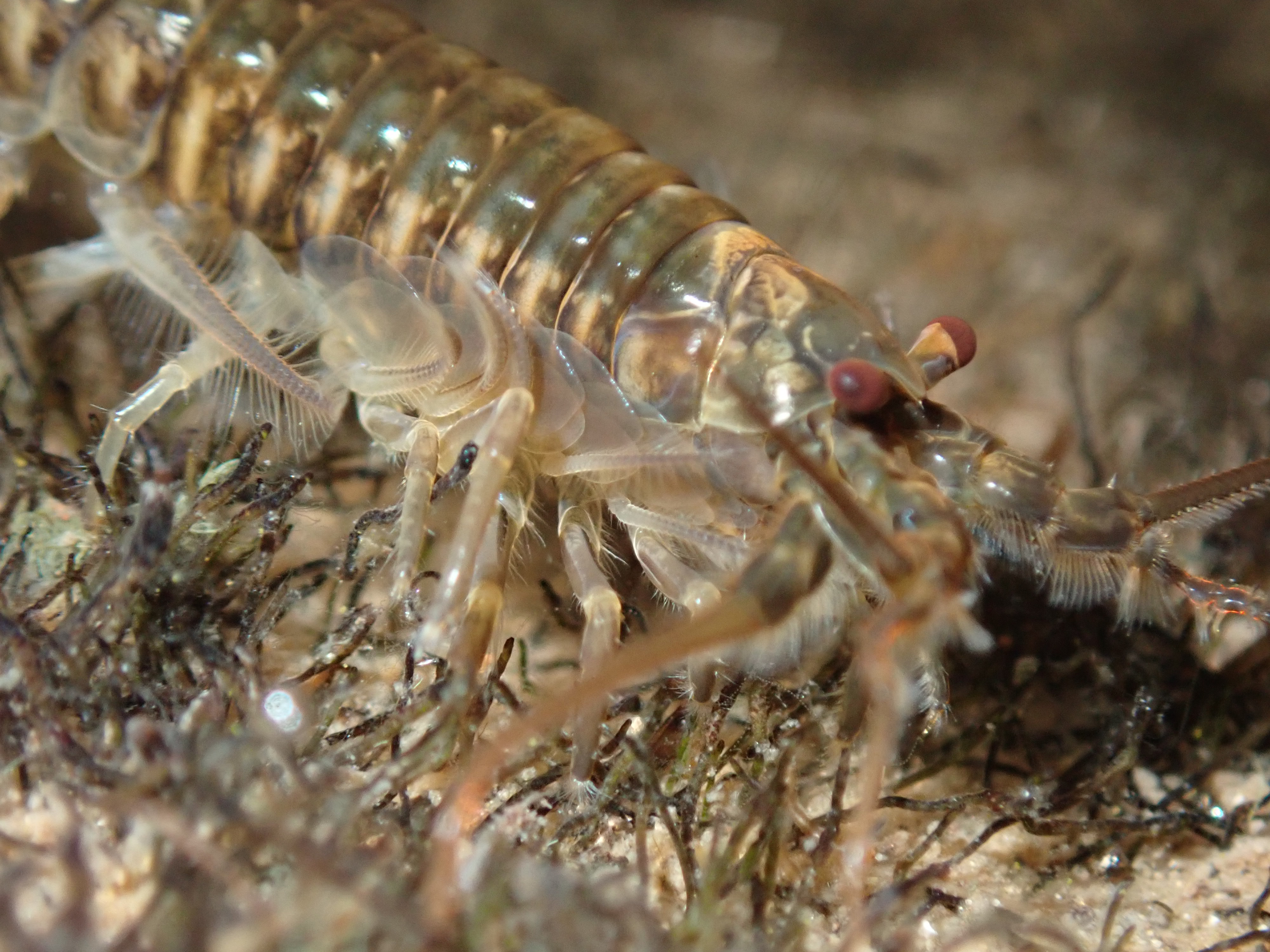
Anaspides in an alpine pool
