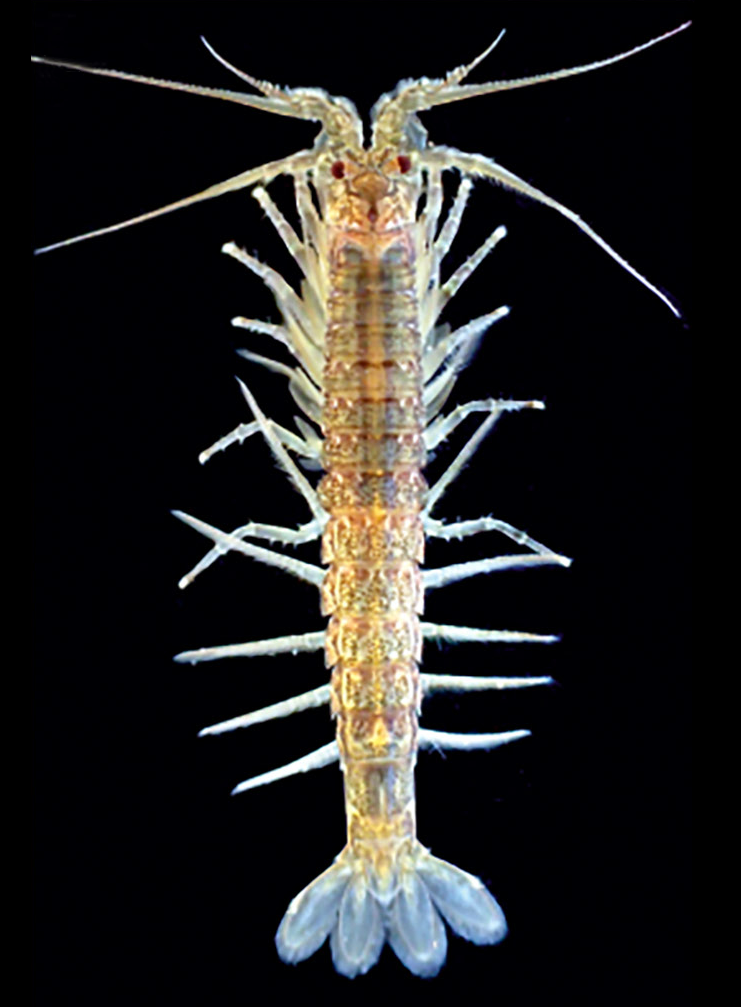

Scientific classification
- Kingdom: Animalia
- Phylum: Arthropoda
- Class: Malacostraca
- Order: Anaspidacea
- Family: Anaspidesidae
- Genus: Anaspides
- Species: A. driesseni

Binomial name
- Anaspides driesseni Höpel, Richter & Ahyong, 2023
- Holotype site (TMAG G9228 ♂): Weld River, TAS

= Anaspides driesseni =

Species of crustaceans

Anaspides driesseni is a species of freshwater crustacean in the family Anaspidesidae, and was first described in 2023 by Christoph Höpel, Stefan Richter & Shane Ahyong. In 2016 Ahyong discussed three morphologically different forms of A. swaini occurring in three different drainage systems.

The species epithet honours Michael Driessen.

This species is endemic to Tasmania, and is found in "South-eastern Tasmania from the Arve Valley and Hartz Mountains area over the Mt Picton area and Snowy Mountains to the Wellington Range and western to northwestern Mt Wellington (Collinsvale and North West Bay River catchment); Southern-Derwent and Huon drainage system".
