= Anaspides clarkei =

Scientific classification
- Kingdom: Animalia
- Phylum: Arthropoda
- Clade: Pancrustacea
- Class: Malacostraca
- Order: Anaspidacea
- Family: Anaspidesidae
- Genus: Anaspides
- Species: A. clarkei

Binomial name
- Anaspides clarkei Ahyong, 2015

Species of crustaceans

Paratype site: Exit Cave, Ida Bay Karst, TAS

Anaspides clarkei is a species of freshwater crustacean in the family Anaspidesidae, and was first described in 2015 by Shane Ahyong

This species is endemic to Tasmania, and is a cave dweller.
