= Anaspides jarmani =

Scientific classification
- Kingdom: Animalia
- Phylum: Arthropoda
- Clade: Pancrustacea
- Class: Malacostraca
- Order: Anaspidacea
- Family: Anaspidesidae
- Genus: Anaspides
- Species: A. jarmani

Binomial name
- Anaspides jarmani Ahyong, 2015

Species of crustaceans

Holotype site (AM P73039): Adamsons Peak, Hartz Mountains National Park

Anaspides jarmani is a species of freshwater crustacean in the family Anaspidesidae, and was first described in 2015 by Shane Ahyong

This species is endemic to Tasmania, and known only from its type locality.
