= Anaspides richardsoni =

Scientific classification
- Kingdom: Animalia
- Phylum: Arthropoda
- Clade: Pancrustacea
- Class: Malacostraca
- Order: Anaspidacea
- Family: Anaspidesidae
- Genus: Anaspides
- Species: A. richardsoni

Binomial name
- Anaspides richardsoni Ahyong, 2016

Species of crustacean

Anaspides richardsoni is a species of arthropod native to Australia.
