= Punyelroo, South Australia =

Punyelroo South Australia
- Coordinates: 34°36′16″S 139°36′6″E
- Population: 39 (SAL 2021)
- Postcode(s): 5354
- Time zone: ACST (UTC+9:30)
  - Summer (DST): ACDT (UTC+10:30)
- Location: 57 km (35 mi) SE of Nurioopta
- LGA(s): Mid Murray Council
- State electorate(s): Schubert
- Federal division(s): Barker

Punyelroo is a town located on the Murray River in South Australia, Australia, approximately 5 kilometres downstream from Swan Reach, but on the opposite (western or Adelaide City) side of riverbank. The town is named after a local homestead. It accessible by sealed bitumen road most conveniently off the Sedan Swan Reach Road or by a well made dirt road from Mannum.

Punyelroo is known for the Punyelroo Cave, located on the banks of the Murray River. The cave is approximately 3 kilometres in length, and is the longest of the several caves located in the Murray Plains area. In a 2021 Caves Australia article, Karl Brandt proposed Punyelroo Cave as the historical lair of the Whowie, a fearsome creature from Australian Aboriginal mythology.

Punyelroo is a town with water front properties and shacks. There is also a caravan/camping park with a boat ramp made up predominantly of owner occupied shack owners and on-site managers residence.
