= Anaspides eberhardi =

Scientific classification
- Kingdom: Animalia
- Phylum: Arthropoda
- Class: Malacostraca
- Order: Anaspidacea
- Family: Anaspidesidae
- Genus: Anaspides
- Species: A. eberhardi

Binomial name
- Anaspides eberhardi Ahyong, 2016

Species of freshwater crustacean

Anaspides eberhardi is a species of freshwater, cave-dwelling crustacean in the family Anaspidesidae. It was first described in 2016 by Shane Ahyong. The species name is an eponym, honouring Stefan Eberhard rather than describing a morphological feature.

Like all members of the genus Anaspides, A. eberhardi is endemic to Tasmania. It has been recorded from caves in the Junee-Florentine karst system.

A. eberhardi can be distinguished from other members of the genus by its distinctly more elongated and posteriorly tapering telson.
