= WASG =

WASG may refer to:

- WASG (AM), a radio station (540 AM) licensed to Atmore, Alabama, United States
- Western Australian Speleology Group located in Western Australia, Australia
- Wide area synchronous grid
- Labour and Social Justice – The Electoral Alternative, known as WASG in German
