= Allanaspides hickmani =

Conservation status
- Vulnerable (IUCN 2.3)

Scientific classification
- Kingdom: Animalia
- Phylum: Arthropoda
- Clade: Pancrustacea
- Class: Malacostraca
- Order: Anaspidacea
- Family: Anaspidesidae
- Genus: Allanaspides
- Species: A. hickmani

Binomial name
- Allanaspides hickmani Swain, Wilson & Ong, 1971

Species of crustacean

Allanaspides hickmani, also known as Hickman's Pygmy Mountain Shrimp, is a species of mountain shrimp in the family Anaspididae. This shrimp species has eyes located terminally on eyestalks.

The IUCN conservation status of Allanaspides hickmani is "VU", vulnerable. The species faces a high risk of endangerment in the medium term. The IUCN status was reviewed in 1996.
