= Punyelroo Cave =

Cave in South Australia

- Location within South Australia Location within Australia
- Location: Punyelroo, South Australia, Australia
- Coordinates: 34°35′39″S 139°36′40″E
- Length: 3 kilometres (1.86 mi)
- Elevation: 8 metres (26 ft)
- Geology: Miocene sandstone

Punyelroo Cave is a horizontal solution cave extending for approximately three kilometres (1.86 mi) into a Miocene sandstone cliff on the banks of the Murray River in South Australia, five kilometres (3.11 mi) south of Swan Reach. It is the longest cave on the river system.

== Indigenous history ==
The cave is located on the traditional lands of the Ngawait clan. Evidence of indigenous occupation, in the form of shell fragments and quartz chips in a band of ash, was uncovered in the cave mouth during a 1937 expedition.

== Exploration ==
An early account of the cave comes from an 1876 visit from the paddle steamer, Excelsior, under Captain T. Brakenridge.

The cave was formally described in 1938 following a University of Adelaide expedition the year prior. The Cave Exploration Group of South Australia conducted further surveys in 1955.

== Description ==
The cave mouth rises twelve metres (39 ft) above the floor before sloping down to a height of between one and three metres (3–10 ft) along the main passageways.

Two red gum logs, approximately 2,600 years old with the longest measuring eight-metres (26 ft), are found 160 and 180 metres (525 and 591 ft) from the cave mouth. Based on earlier observations, floodwaters have carried the log closest to the mouth 140 metres (459 ft) further into the cave since 1937.

A major fork takes place at the second log, and after around 550 metres (1,804 ft), the main north-south passage is blocked by a rockfall. One of the rocks is now known as Randell’s Rock due to a R.E Randell carving their name into it in 1881.

== Folklore ==
Prior to formal surveying, there was the unsubstantiated claim that the cave stretched for over 100 kilometres (62 mi) before opening up at Overland Corner on the Murray. Other stories claimed the cave contained a pool of water with a thriving gum tree on its banks as well as a cloven hoof-shaped print known as the ‘devil’s hoof-mark’ on the floor.

== Indigenous legends ==
According to local Aboriginal legend, Nooreel, an ancestral crow spirit, fought Narnooroo, the goanna, at the North-West Bend, around 70 kilometres (43 mi) to the north of the cave. The crow cast the goanna into in a hole in the cliff and blocked it up with stones, but Narnooroo clawed himself out through what is now the entrance to the Punyelroo Cave.

In a 2021 Caves Australia article, Karl Brandt proposed Punyelroo Cave as the historical lair of the Whowie, a fearsome creature from Australian Aboriginal mythology.
