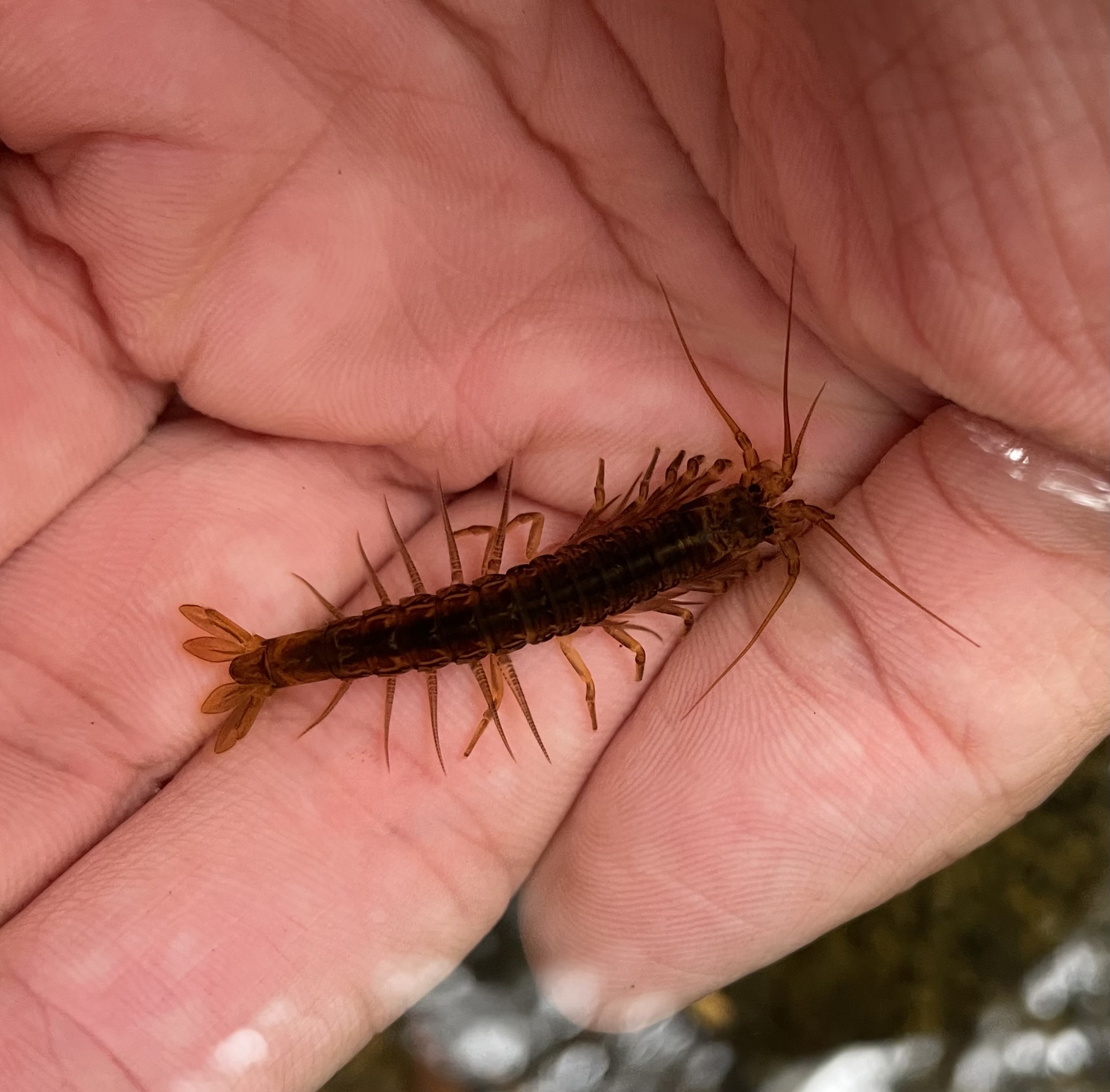
- Anaspides tasmaniae

Scientific classification
- Kingdom: Animalia
- Phylum: Arthropoda
- Class: Malacostraca
- Order: Anaspidacea
- Family: Anaspidesidae
- Genus: Anaspides; Thomson, 1894

= Anaspides =

Genus of crustaceans

Anaspides is a genus of freshwater crustaceans in the family Anaspidesidae. The genus was first described in 1894 by George Malcolm Thomson. The genus was originally placed in the family, Anaspididae by Thomson, but this genus name was preoccupied by the insect genus, Anaspis Geoffroy, 1762, and therefore, in 2017, the family was renamed Anaspidesidae by Shane Ahyong and Miguel A. Alonso-Zarazaga.

The genus is endemic to Tasmania.

== Species ==
After Höpel et al. (2023)

- Anaspides clarkei Ahyong, 2015
- Anaspides driesseni Höpel, Richter & Ahyong, 2023
- Anaspides jarmani Ahyong, 2015
- Anaspides spinulae Williams, 1965
- Anaspides swaini Ahyong, 2015
- Anaspides tasmaniae (Thomson, 1893)
- Anaspides richardsoni Ahyong, 2016
- Anaspides eberhardi Ahyong, 2016
