= Agnes Milowka =

Australian cave diver

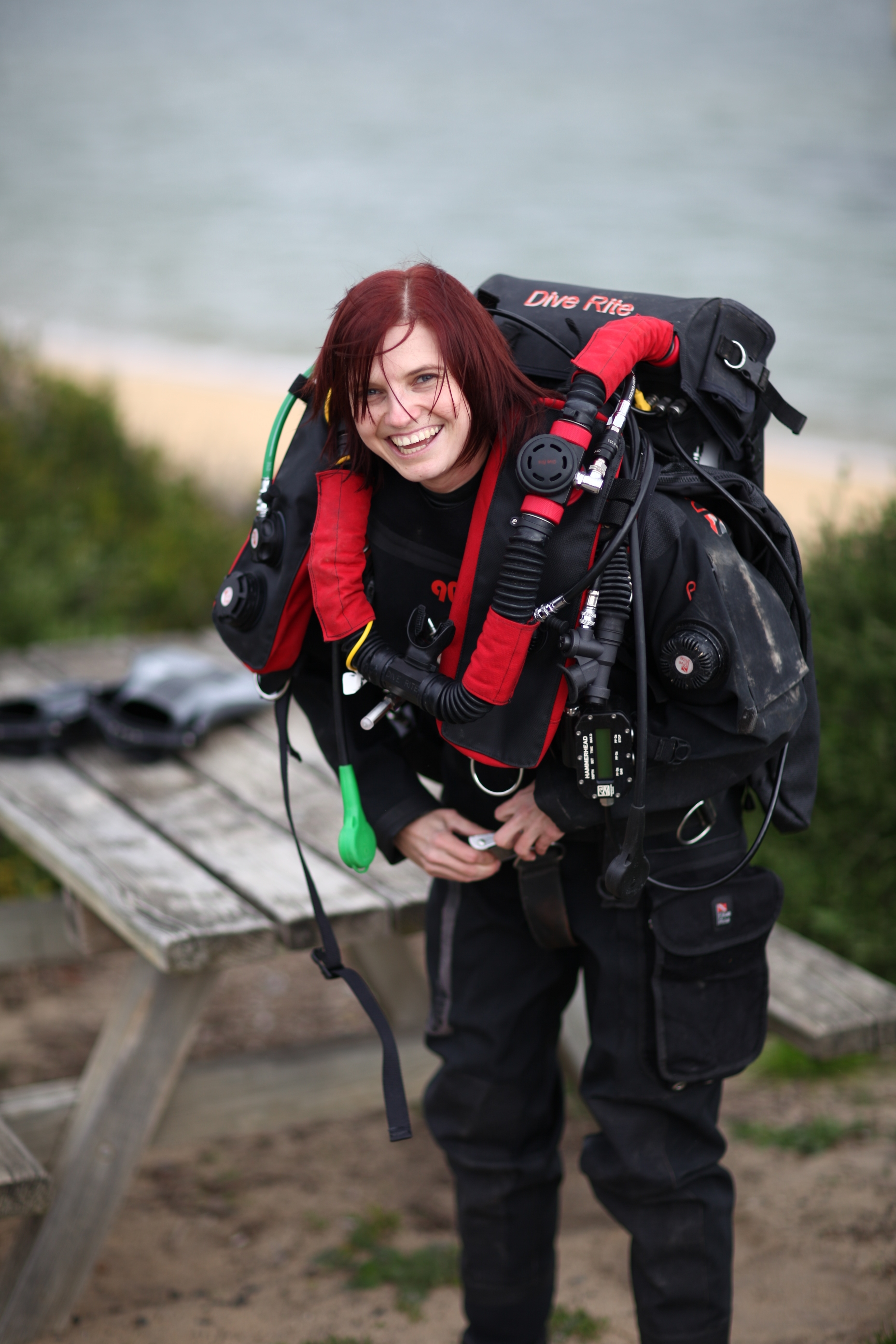
- Portrait at Melbourne Port Phillip Bay, 2010
- Born: Agnieszka Milówka; 23 December 1981; Częstochowa, Poland
- Died: 27 February 2011 (aged 29); Tank Cave near Tantanoola, South Australia
- Cause of death: Drowning
- Citizenship: Australian, Polish
- Education: Caulfield Grammar School
- Alma mater: Victoria University, Flinders University, University of Melbourne
- Occupations: Technical diver, underwater photographer, author, cave explorer, marketing manager
- Years active: 2002–2011
- Website: www.agnesmilowka.com

Signature
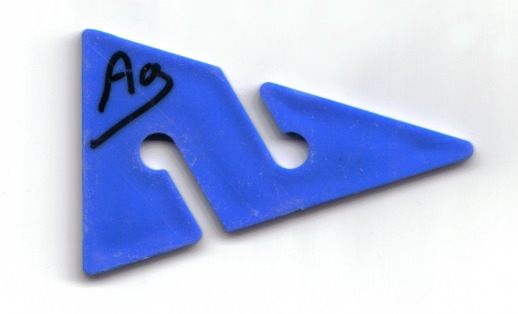

Agnes Milowka (23 December 1981 – 27 February 2011) was an Australian technical diver, underwater photographer, author, maritime archaeologist and cave explorer. She gained international recognition for penetrating deeper than previous explorers into cave systems across Australia and Florida, and as a public speaker and author on the subjects of diving and maritime archaeology. She died aged 29 while diving in a confined space.

== Early life and schooling ==
Born in Częstochowa, Poland, Milowka moved to Melbourne at an early age with her parents, attending Caulfield Grammar School from 1994 to 1999. At the school, she was a house captain, champion school rower and was a finalist in the statewide VCE achiever award. She received her graduate degrees in Maritime Archaeology from Flinders University (2007), Bachelor of Business, Marketing and Event Management from Victoria University (2008), Bachelor of Arts, History and Australian Studies from University of Melbourne (2005), where she was a president of the Melbourne University Underwater Club (2003–2005).

In the summer of 2007 she completed an internship in St. Augustine, Florida, with LAMP (Lighthouse Archaeological Maritime Program), the research arm of the St. Augustine Lighthouse & Museum, where she participated in the archaeological excavation of historic shipwreck sites. This work would introduce her to Florida diving, where she would go on to explore extensive cave systems. During her schooling, she participated as the researcher and diver in a series of qualitative underwater archeological research projects.

== Diving ==
In the effort coordinated by Victorian Speleological Association in 2009, she and James Arundale explored Elk River streamway cave system by an additional 1,400 metres (4,600 ft), which has potential to become the longest continuous stream passage in Victoria, Australia. In a 2009 expedition near Cocklebiddy, she reached the midpoint of Craig Challen's 2008 line giving her the record for the longest cave dive in Australia for a female. She worked as an underwater grip in 2008 for a film by Discovery Channel Japan, "Water's Journey" by TV Asahi & Karst Productions. She was part of the National Geographic Nova TV Special expedition to Blue Holes of the Bahamas, in December 2008, as an underwater grip, followed by the expedition to look for similar sinkholes in Queensland, Australia in October 2009.

Milowka was a photographic assistant on the National Geographic Magazine expedition to Bahamas Caves, November–December 2009, resulting in a few of her photos being published by the National Geographic website. Her underwater photography has been included in multimedia library of the popular website creation software WebEasy Professional (since 2007), distributed by Avanquest Software.

In 2010, when living in Florida, she laid over 4,000 metres (13,000 ft) of line across a number of cave systems, the most significant of which was Baptizing (aka Mission) Spring. In August 2010, together with James Toland, she made the connection between Peacock Springs and Baptizing Spring, Florida adding over 3,000 metres (9,800 ft) of passage. She was the presenter and editor for TV series "Agnes Milowka Project" (2010) featuring underwater cave footage shot by Wes Skiles, Karst Productions.

Agnes Milowka was a speaker at a number of diving related conferences (OZTek 2009, EuroTek 2010). She acted as a stunt double for two female characters on the James Cameron-produced feature film Sanctum (2011) and worked during the production as cave dive instructor to the actors. In 2011 she was nominated as Dive Rite Ambassador. One of her last jobs was as a diving supervisor on BIRTH, a short film for the TRIMÄPEE fashion label. The movie has been dedicated in her name.

== Death ==
In February 2011, she ran out of air and died after parting company to explore a tight restriction, which necessitated going solo, in the Tank Cave near Tantanoola in the south east of South Australia.

== Legacy ==
In recognition of Milowka's achievements and legacy, The Agnes Milowka Memorial Environmental Science Award has been established by Mummu Media for underprivileged schools in the area of science, marine studies or exploration. In May 2011 Agnes Milowka posthumously received the Exploration Award, in recognition of the outstanding and dedicated service to the National Speleological Society Cave Diving Section, USA.

A number of geologic features have been named in memory and her original exploration work in Australia: "Ag's Dreamtime Passage" in the underwater Olwolgin Cave on Nullarbor Plain, "Agnes Chamber" in Davies Cave System, Bats Ridge, Victoria and "Milowka Canal" in Elk River Cave, Victoria. Her name has been featured in memoriam at 2011 Australian Academy of Cinema and Television Arts AACTA and in popular sci-fi webcomic book Crimson Dark, the alliance starship has been named A.W.S. Milowka.

== Author ==
Milowka authored articles on the subject of underwater exploration, and her experiences and work as a diver. These include:

- Let's Talk About... The S Word
- Heaven is a place on earth
- Why Ginnie and I are like peas and carrots
- Virgin Territory: Devil's Eye past the restriction
- Deep holes in the ground that will blow your mind: Bahamas
- Mission Spring
- Cave diving in Victoria: Exploration of the Elk River streamway (co-authored with Jim Arundale)
- In the heart of Tiger's Eye
- Virgin Territory: Devil's Eye Cave System Beyond Restriction
- Deep Holes. Unraveling The Mysteries of the Bahamas
- Mission Spring Exploration
- The Elk River Streamway: A hump to a sump
- Eye of the Tiger: On expedition in Tassie
- The Taming Continues: The Peacock to Baptizing Connection, co-author James Toland

== See also ==
- Wes Skiles Peacock Springs State Park – State park in Florida, United States
- Blue hole – Marine cavern or sinkhole, open to the surface, in carbonate bedrock
- Dean's Blue Hole – Deep water-filled sinkhole in the Bahamas
- List of Caulfield Grammar School people
