= Allanaspides helonomus =

Conservation status
- Vulnerable (IUCN 2.3)

Scientific classification
- Kingdom: Animalia
- Phylum: Arthropoda
- Class: Malacostraca
- Order: Anaspidacea
- Family: Anaspidesidae
- Genus: Allanaspides
- Species: A. helonomus

Binomial name
- Allanaspides helonomus Swain, Wilson, Hickman & Ong, 1970

Species of crustacean endemic to Tasmania

Allanaspides helonomus is a species of mountain shrimp in the family Anaspididae.

The IUCN conservation status of Allanaspides helonomus is "VU", vulnerable. The species faces a high risk of endangerment in the medium term. The IUCN status was reviewed in 1996.
