= Eucrenonaspides =

Conservation status
- Vulnerable (IUCN 2.3)

Scientific classification
- Kingdom: Animalia
- Phylum: Arthropoda
- Class: Malacostraca
- Order: Anaspidacea
- Family: Psammaspididae
- Genus: Eucrenonaspides; Knott & Lake, 1980
- Species: E. oinotheke

Binomial name
- Eucrenonaspides oinotheke Knott & Lake, 1980

Species of crustacean endemic to Tasmania, Australia

Eucrenonaspides oinotheke is a species of crustacean in the family Psammaspididae, endemic to Tasmania, the only species described in the genus Eucrenonaspides. Eucrenonaspides is in the order Anaspidacea. It was described from a spring at 9 Payton Place, Devonport, Tasmania in 1980, making it "the first spring-dwelling syncarid recorded from the Australian region". It is listed as a vulnerable species on the IUCN Red List. A further undescribed species is known from south-western Tasmania.

== Description ==
Eucrenonaspides oinotheke is a type of crustacean and part of the Anaspidacea order. Eucrenonaspides oinotheke has its own unique structure that encompasses a head and thorax. These do not have a shieldlike carapace and the first thoracic segment is tightly joined with the head. They also have pairs of maxillipeds, and thoracic limbs associated with the mouth. The head of Eucrenonaspides oinotheke is sub-rectangular and divided into two unequal regions by transverse mandibular grooves. Each side of the head is a mandibular groove which meet in the midline. These mandibular groove's pass obliquely backward to a level near the posterior margin of the head and defines an inferior plate. Eucrenonaspides oinotheke's head appendages and the antennule, a small antenna in a crustacean, includes a peduncle of three segments, a comparatively robust outer flagellum which is approximately half the total body length. Further, the antennule comprises a peduncle of three segments, a comparatively robust outer flagellum which is approximately half the total body length. There is a side boundary of the large basal segment which is curved convexly at the base. The male antennule available for study does not show a sensory modification on the basal outer flagellum segment, but all specimens have a small, triangular projection on the dorsal margin of this segment which supports a long seta. The number of segments per outer flagellum varies from 17 to 29 and from 6 to 10 for the inner one. The outer flagellum is approximately twice the length of the inner one. The number of segments in the flagellum varies from 8 to 21. The pleon is known as the abdomen of a crustacean. In Eucrenonaspides oinotheke, the pleon is slightly flattened where along the posterior margin there is a row of long setospines. Pleonites can bear one pair of pleopods where the exopodites are long and multisegmented or short. The pleopods do not have endopodites.

Additionally, Eucrenonaspides oinotheke contains pairs of thoracic legs which are either unbranched or branched. In biramous legs, the inner branch is called the endopod, and the outer branch is called the exopod. They also have flaplike gills, used for breathing underwater, which are located on the bases of the legs. The movements of the exopods keep oxygen-carrying water flowing over the gills. The abdomen also has segments where there are five pairs of pleopods or limblike structures attached to the underside of the abdomen. The tip of the abdomen has a pair of long appendages called uropods which are found on either side of a central tail segment, or telson. They also have an abdomen has a pair of long appendages called uropods. The uropods are found on either side of a central tail segment, or telson. Eucrenonaspides oinotheke does not have eyes with a slender body that does not reflect a colour and is classified as transparent.

== Habitat ==
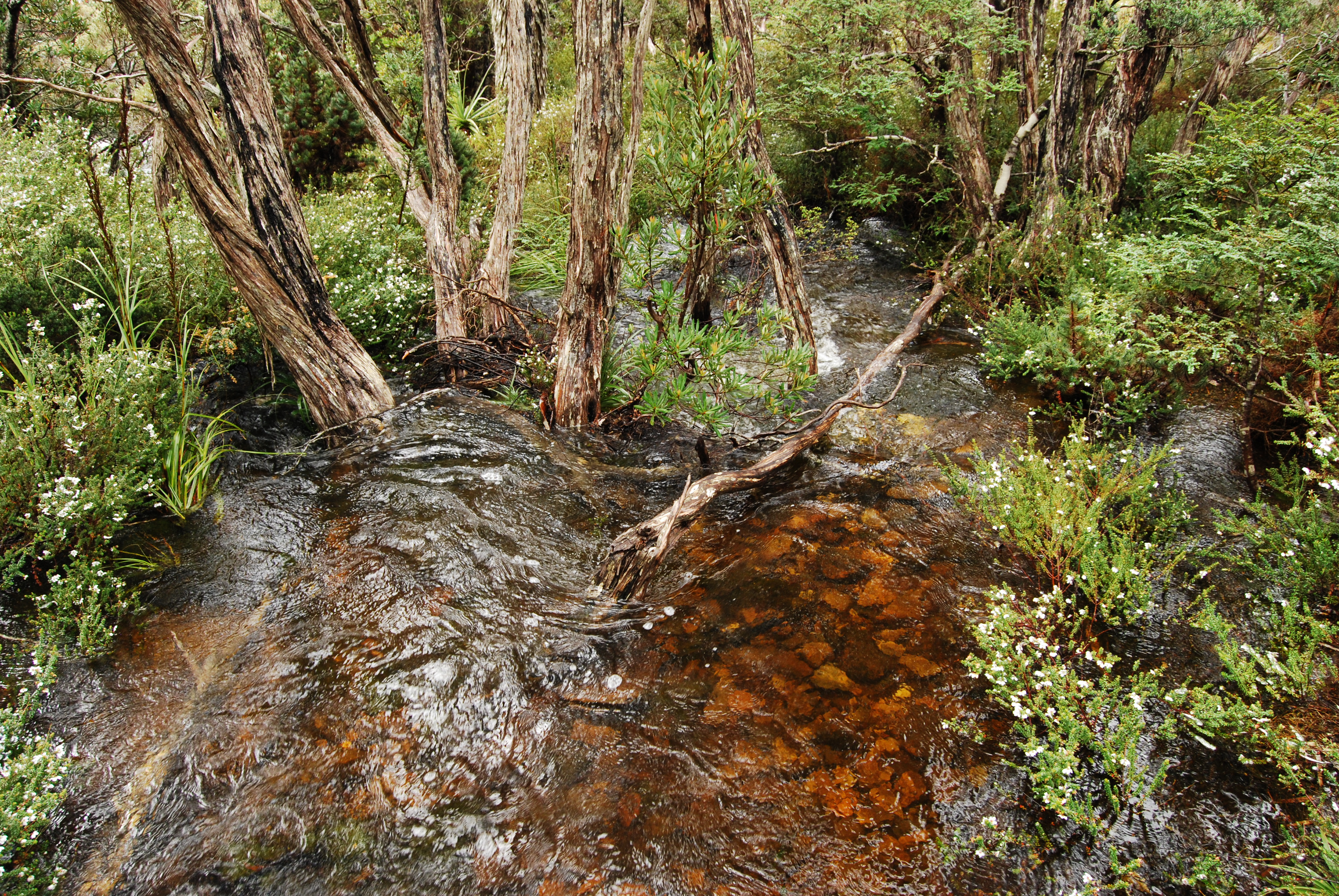
Tasmanian stream

Eucrenonaspides oinotheke is part of crustacean fauna and a larger species of the Anaspidaceans. Their main habitat is caves, cave streams, lakes and terrestrial woodlice along with millipede located in Tasmania. They are predominantly found in drip pools, seepages and similar habitats out of the main flow of water. However, Eucrenonaspides oinotheke do not exist in groundwaters of the mainland.

Eucrenonaspides oinotheke in particular was found near the centre of a large town, the spring at Payton Place, Devonport. Although springs are common in and about Devonport, particularly in areas of basalt substrates, efforts to find other sources of the species or related forms have proved unsuccessful. The distribution of Psammaspids and thus Eucrenonaspides oinotheke are only known to occur at 3 widely separated localities of New South Wales, Tasmania and Camperdown, Western Victoria. This has shown the family of the Psammaspids were once, distributed across the whole of southern Australia. This area experienced a wet climate, that could stem from the Triassic until midway through the Tertiary, although part of this area was inundated by marine transgressions during the early Cretaceous. Subsequently, there is a chance that they may be found elsewhere in southern Australia, such as in springs in Western Australia.

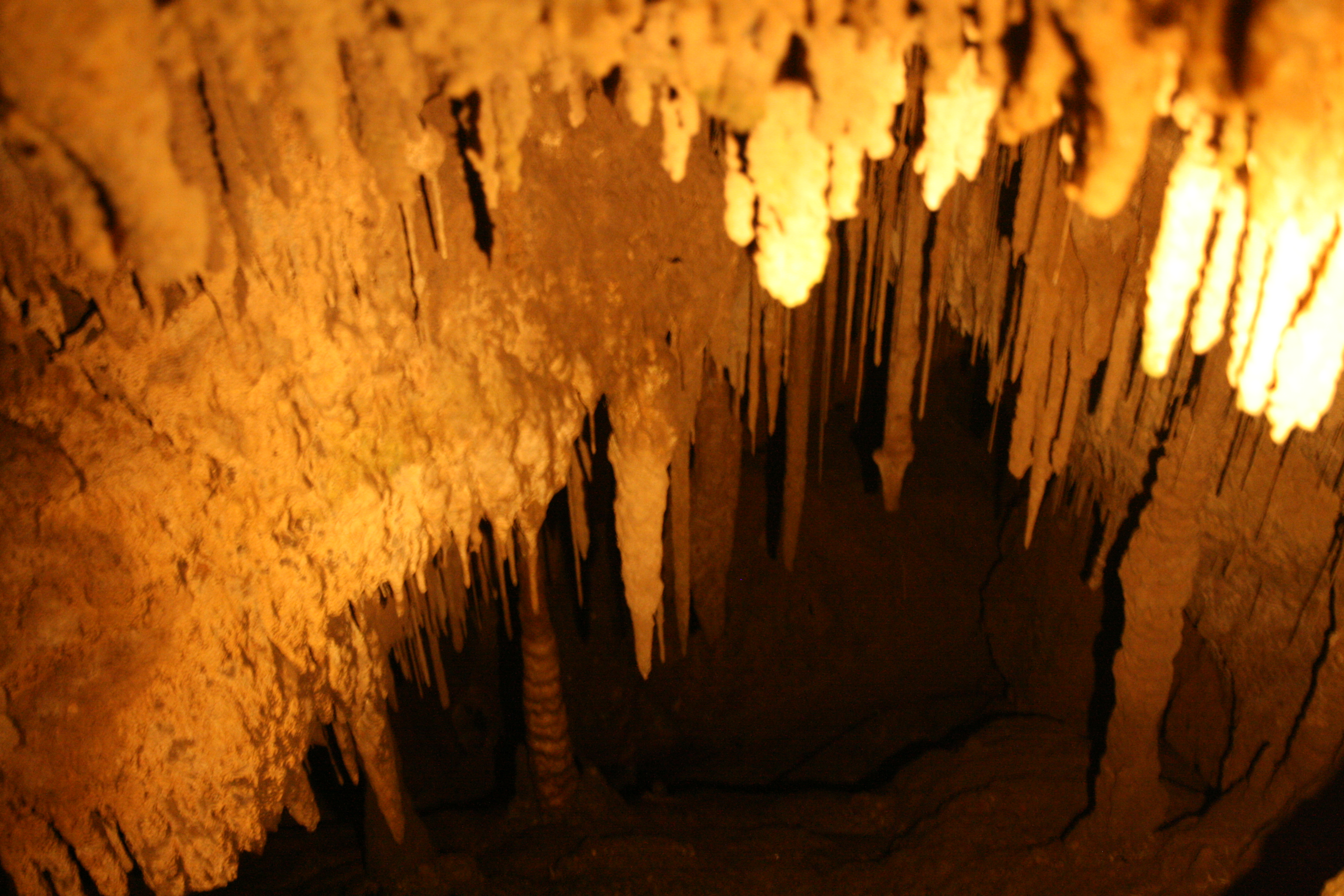
Tasmanian cave

== Threats ==
Eucrenonaspides ointheke found in Tasmanian caves are exposed to many threats. This is because caves are dependent for their fundamental energy and vulnerable to the environment around them. Cave ecosystems are predominately at risk from development pressure on land and harm from humans such as quarrying or pollution. Additionally, water mainly carries in food to the temperate caves, making their fauna at risk from land use practices which affect the quality of water entering them. This would threaten the drinking and liveable water for Eucrenonaspides. Human harm can also threaten Eucrenonaspides ointheke that are living in seepage pools as these can be destroyed by footsteps.

As Eucrenonaspides ointheke lives in a habitat of cave dwelling classified as pools, or streamways there are numerous threats. These pools, and their associated seepage waters, may be colonised by a fauna which is distinct from that in larger streamways. These small and patchily distributed habitats are sensitive to trampling impacts that include human footsteps that can degrade and destroy them. This is harmful as streams are a vital macro-habitat as they support an abundant aquatic fauna and transport the food supply for much of the terrestrial fauna. Food sources transported by streams include plant detritus such as wood and leaf litter, and accidental species.

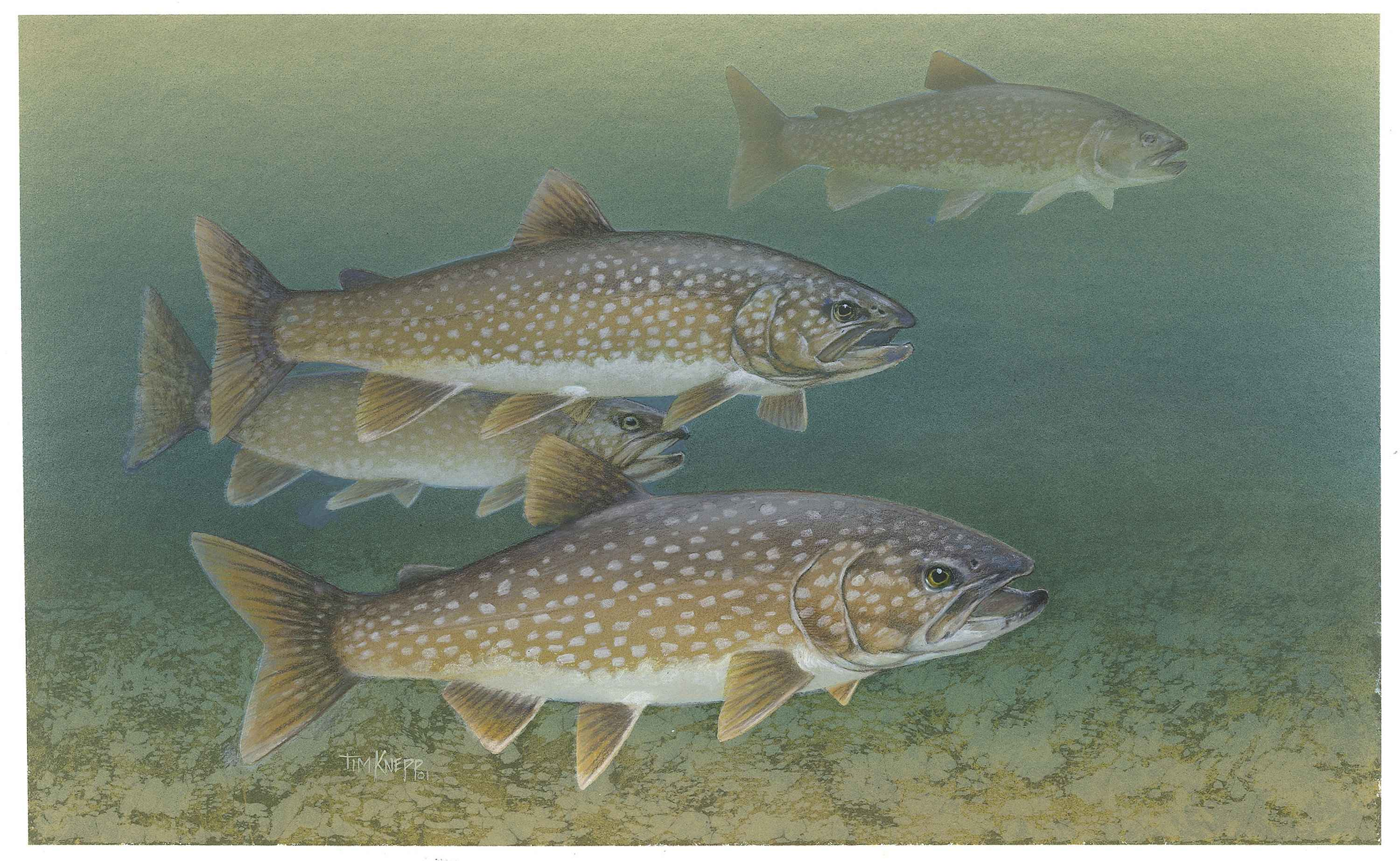
Trout

Trout are another threat to Eucrenonaspides ointheke. The trout there introduced by Australian colonists from Europe and thus Eucrenonaspides ointheke does not have natural defences against this species. They therefore can only survive in isolated branches of streams and rivers that are out of reach from the trout. The conservation status of Eucrenonaspides ointheke is vulnerable or facing high rate of extinction in the wild, listed by the World conservation Union (IUCN).

== Behaviour and reproduction ==
Eucrenonaspides oinotheke use their thoractic legs to crawl in their habitat which constantly circulates oxygen-carrying water over their flaplike gills. Their thoracic and abdominal limbs move together in a smooth, rhythmic motion. They are not strong swimmers, in its place they typically walk over the substrate. The exopods of the thoracic legs are in constant motion to circulate fresh, oxygen-bearing water past the flattened epipods. When they are startled, they are capable of jumping upwards.

Males and females are known, but there is no research on mating. Unlike most crustaceans that carry their eggs or young, female Anaspidaceans and thus Eucrenonaspides oinotheke lay their eggs individually on plants or stones. Subsequently, they do not guard or provide care for their young. The eggs hatch between 30 and 60 days as larvae that encompass antennae and mouthparts only. Adulthood is reached through a series of molts, or sheddings of the exoskeleton and appendages are added with each molt.

The eggs are attached to bits of bark or plant or laid in crevices where in living forms, development is slow. Eggs are laid in spring or early summer and take 32–35 weeks to hatch; those laid in the fall take 60 weeks to hatch because of a period of winter inactivity. There are two peaks occur for hatching: April–May and July–August. Animals hatch as juveniles, and the ability to distinguish between the two hatching peaks by size departs after the first year.

== Internal anatomy ==
The digestive system of Eucrenonaspides oinotheke consists of a short esophagus which leads to the cardiac stomach and an esophagus plug which extends into the cardiac stomach. The ceca arise as a mass of long strands at the forward end of the midgut and extend the length of the thorax. There are also single short median dorsal ceca in the first and fifth pleomeres. The proctodeum extends inwards from the anus to the level of the sixth pleomere. There are no gastric mill, ossicles or teeth in the foregut. This small stomach framework thus constrains the diet.

The circulatory system contains the heart which extends from the first thoracomere to the fourth pleomere. One pair of ostia is found in the third thoracomere, and anterior and posterior dorsal aortae extend outward from the heart. There are seven pairs of lateral arteries containing visceral and podial branches. The first pair arises from the anterior end of the heart and extends into the head. The second pair is found in the last thoracomere, with one of the branches forming a ventral aorta to supply the thoracopods and the third pair arises in the first pleomere to supply the thoracic viscera. The rest supply the viscera and the pleopods.

Additionally, the nervous system centers on a large supra-esophageal ganglion, without a large, fused, subesophageal ganglion; the post-oral ganglia in the trunk are all separate and distinct. The nerve cord includes a band of fibers connecting the segmental ganglia and two sets of lateral, giant fibers. These occur on either side in the nerve cord which are effective in eliciting a caridoid escape reaction. This is where the entire series of trunk segments flexes at once, exhibiting an evasive reaction, but does not move the animal away from danger. Additional sensory organs include statocysts in the antennules and distinctive dorsal organs on the head where the eyes are absent.

== Diet ==
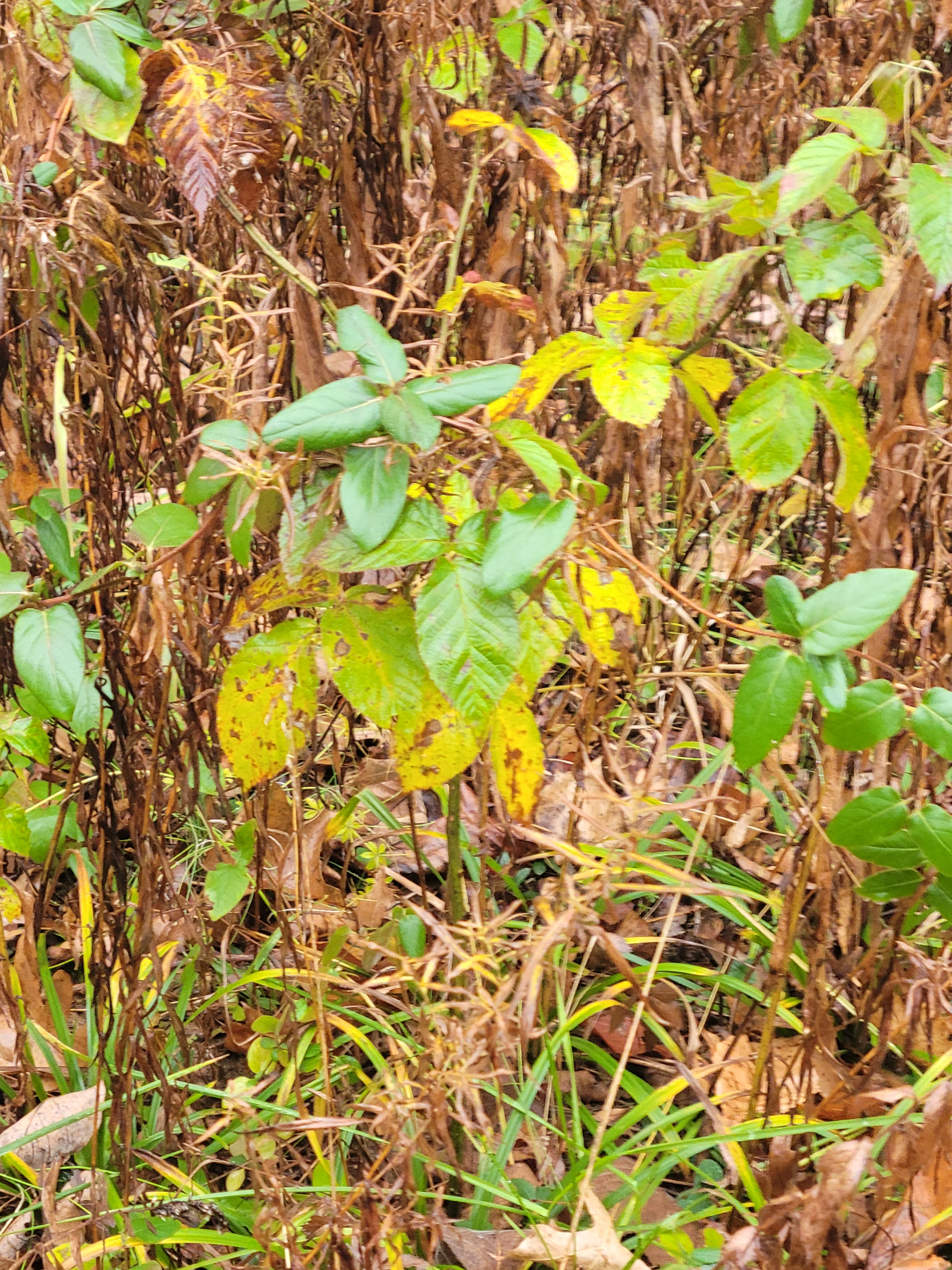
Plants included in diet

Eucrenonaspides oinotheke eat plant and animal materials and are thus considered omnivores. They search constantly for food, chewing on large pieces of plants or scraping the surfaces of pebbles with its mouth. The streams that Eucrenonaspides oinotheke live in play a large role in their diet. This is because the macro-habitat transports the food supply. The food sources transported by streams include plant detritus such as wood and leaf litter, and accidental species.

== History ==
Eucrenonaspides oinotheke came from a ground spring in a house wine cellar at 6 Payton Place, Devonport. Researchers from the San Diego Natural History Museum tried to recollect this locality in 1990 however due to a drought sighting was found difficult and further research on the history of Eucrenonaspides oinotheke is unknown.
