= Anaspides swaini =

Scientific classification
- Kingdom: Animalia
- Phylum: Arthropoda
- Clade: Pancrustacea
- Class: Malacostraca
- Order: Anaspidacea
- Family: Anaspidesidae
- Genus: Anaspides
- Species: A. swaini

Binomial name
- Anaspides swaini Ahyong, 2015
- Holotype site (AM P73042): Weld River, TAS

Species of crustaceans

Anaspides swaini is a species of freshwater crustacean in the family Anaspidesidae, and was first described in 2015 by Shane Ahyong

This species is endemic to Tasmania, and known only from its type locality.
