= Wes Skiles Peacock Springs State Park =

State park in Florida, United States

Peacock Springs State Park
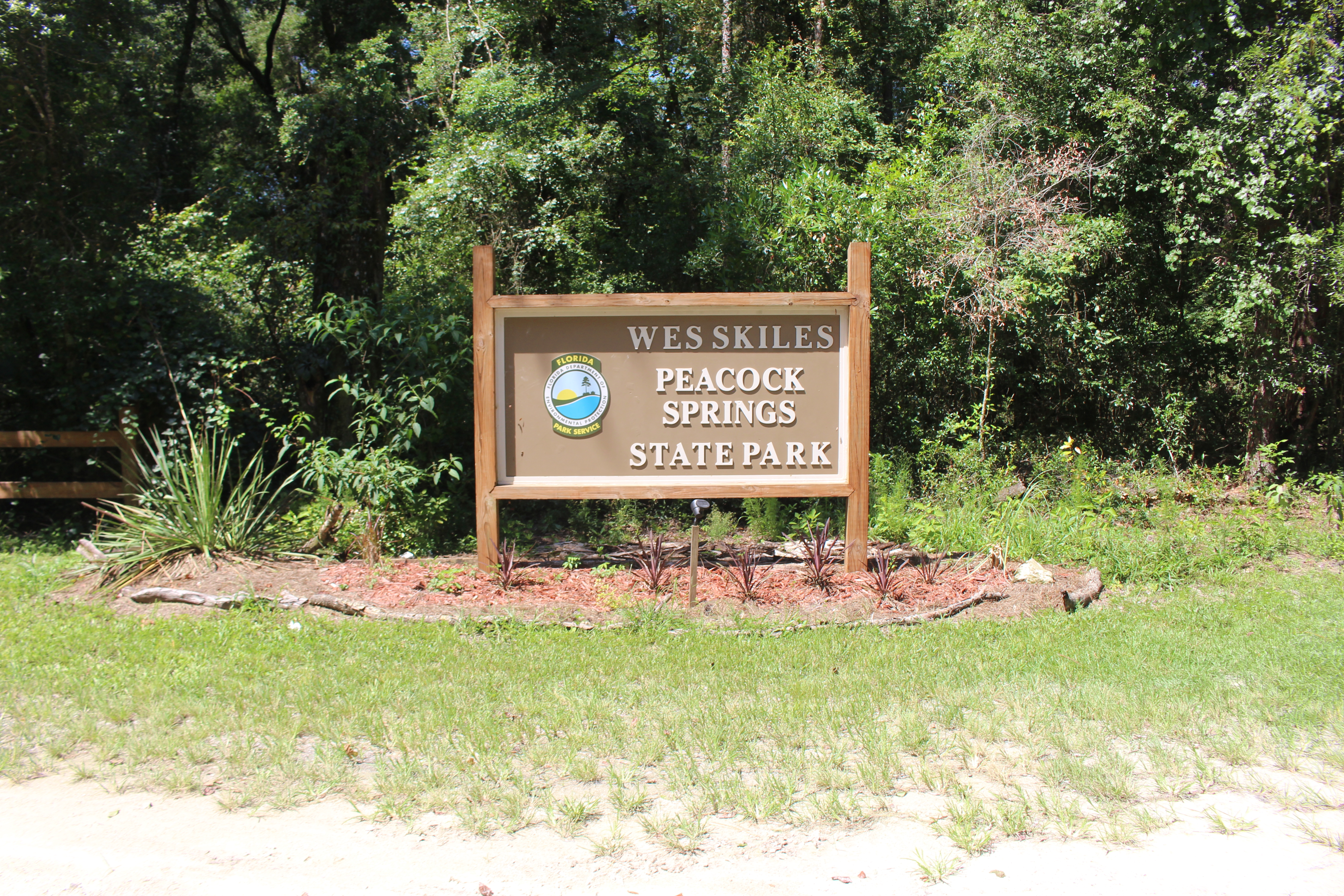

- Location within Florida Location within the United States
- Interactive map of Peacock Springs State Park
- Location: Suwannee County, Florida, USA
- Nearest city: Live Oak, Florida
- Coordinates: 30°07′37″N 83°08′10″W
- Area: 733 acres (297 ha)
- Governing body: Florida Department of Environmental Protection

Wes Skiles Peacock Springs State Park is a 733-acre (297 ha) Florida State Park located on Peacock Springs Road, two miles (3 km) east of Luraville and on State Road 51, 16 miles (26 km) southwest of Live Oak, Florida. Activities include picnicking, swimming and diving, and wildlife viewing. Among the wildlife of the park are deer, bobcats, raccoon, squirrels, beaver and otters, as well as turkey, blue heron and barred owls. The park name commemorates the work of diver and explorer Wes Skiles. Prior to 2010 the park was known as Peacock Springs State Park. Amenities include a nature trail, six sinkholes, and Peacock and Bonnet Springs, with miles of underwater caves popular with cave divers. The two springs are tributaries of the Suwannee River. The park is open from 8:00 am till sundown year round.

== Expansion ==
In 2006, The Trust for Public Land purchased approximately 481-acre (195 ha) for expansion of the park. This donation more than doubled the size of the park that was previously 252-acre (102 ha).

== Cave system ==
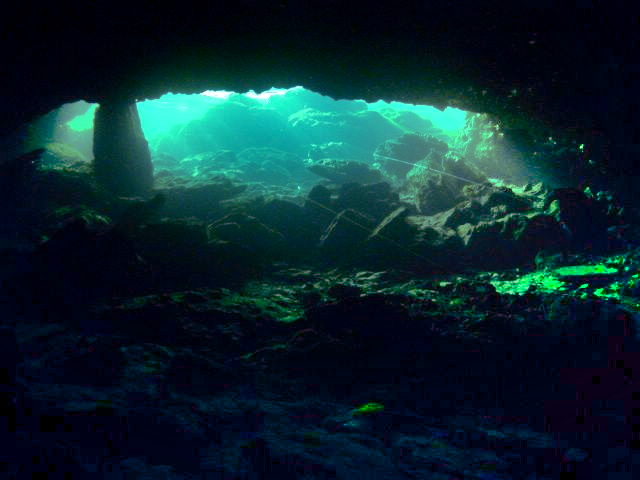
Entrance to cave system.

The Peacock cave system is a karst environment in limestone.

The Peacock Springs Cave system was first explored by Vasco Murray in 1956. The first map of the system was completed by the National Speleological Society team leader, Sheck Exley, in 1995. Exley's team made over 521 dives to complete the survey. A resurvey of the system was completed in 1996 by a team led by Michael Poucher. As of June 13, 2008, the Peacock cave system was the 24th longest underwater cave in the world at 7408 meters. In 2010, a connection was made by Agnes Milowka and James Toland between Baptizing and Peacock springs, extending the total length of the system an additional 10,000 feet (3,000 m).

On April 25, 2002, in order to protect the cave system from damage, the park stopped allowing divers to use Diver Propulsion Vehicles (DPV).

It is one of the largest underwater caves in the continental United States with over 38,000 feet (12,000 m) of explored passageway. The cave system consists of seven major springs and sinkholes, six of which are located within Peacock Springs State Park. Peacock Springs is a popular destination for cave divers all over the world and is extensively used to train new cave divers.

Divers must show proof of scuba certification, and dives must be concluded one hour before sundown.

== Springs and Sinkholes ==
=== Peacock I ===
The Peacock I Spring is the most accessible and most popular site in the system with an elevated walkway and stairs leading to the spring. There are three passageways that converge on the spring called the Pothole tunnel, the Peanut tunnel and the Peacock II tunnel. Each of these three tunnels has a permanent guideline (called a gold line) placed in it to ease navigation by cave divers.

==== Pothole Tunnel ====
The Pothole tunnel, named for the sinkhole 450 feet (140 m) down the tunnel from Peacock I, is the deepest of the three tunnels with a maximum depth of 65 feet (20 m). It contains large open passageways, relatively high ceilings and a silt bottom. The walls are often covered in silt but occasionally the silt will be blown away by floods exposing the white limestone underneath.

==== Peanut Tunnel ====
The Peanut tunnel is a relatively shallow and narrow tunnel. It is named for a section that resembles the two lobes of a peanut. Its depths range from 20 to 60 feet (6.1 to 18.3 m). At approximately 500 and 1,000 feet (150 and 300 m) into the tunnel, crossover tunnels connect the Peanut tunnel to the Pothole tunnel.

==== Peacock II Tunnel ====
The Peacock II tunnel leads to Peacock II spring.

=== Peacock II ===
Peacock II Spring is a smaller spring than Peacock I and provides access to a tunnel into the system through the Peacock II tunnel.

=== Pothole ===
Pothole is a small inline sink approximately one third of the distance between Peacock I and Olsen. The sinkhole has a very small entrance into the Peacock Springs cave system and due to the steep sides, it is inaccessible to cave divers.

=== Olsen Sink ===
Olsen is a small inline sinkhole approximately 1,500 feet (460 m) from Peacock I down the Pothole tunnel. There are two small entrances into the cave system at Olsen dropping into the same tunnel. Being central to the cave system, Olsen was once a popular entrance for cave divers as it allowed easy access to much of the cave. To prevent erosion, cave divers are no longer permitted to enter at Olsen sink as of 2002, although it remains a popular place to temporarily surface during a dive.

=== Orange Grove ===
Orange Grove is a large terminal sinkhole northeast of Peacock I. With a raised walkway and stairs leading into the sinkhole, it is a popular entrance into the cave. Two winding tunnels extend from the sinkhole called Lower Orange Grove and Upper Orange Grove. Lower Orange Grove is a deeper tunnel extending down to 180 feet (55 m). As a very advanced dive, it is not as popular as Upper Orange Grove. Upper Orange Grove is a winding tunnel in all three dimensions starting at 70 feet (21 m) deep and becoming as shallow as 40 feet (12 m). The tunnel extends outside Peacock Spring State Park to Challenge Sink.

=== Challenge Sink ===
Challenge is an inline sink, the northernmost sinkhole in the system, and is the only sinkhole outside of the Peacock Springs State Park. Steep sides make entering and exiting Challenge difficult. It is a popular destination for divers entering Upper Orange Grove.

=== Cisteen Sink ===
Cisteen is a large offset sink like Orange Grove. It offers a very small, silty entrance to the cave system, and is usually covered in a thick layer of duckweed.

=== Peacock III ===
Peacock III is a siphon, meaning it takes in water rather than discharging it, as a spring would. Peacock III has a separate system from Peacock I, II, and its related sinks. The system is very low, silty, and shallow, except for one room, Henley's Castle, which drops to depths of over 200 feet (61 m).

=== Waterhole ===
Waterhole is another offset sink. It contains geological features not seen in the rest of the system, such as low bedding planes, as opposed to the vaulted ceilings found in the rest of the system.

== Interpretive trail ==
A 1.2-mile (1.9 km) interpretive trail begins near Peacock Spring I and follows the route of part of the underwater cave system. Signs describe cave features, cave exploration, and the surrounding forest's plants and animals.

== Gallery ==
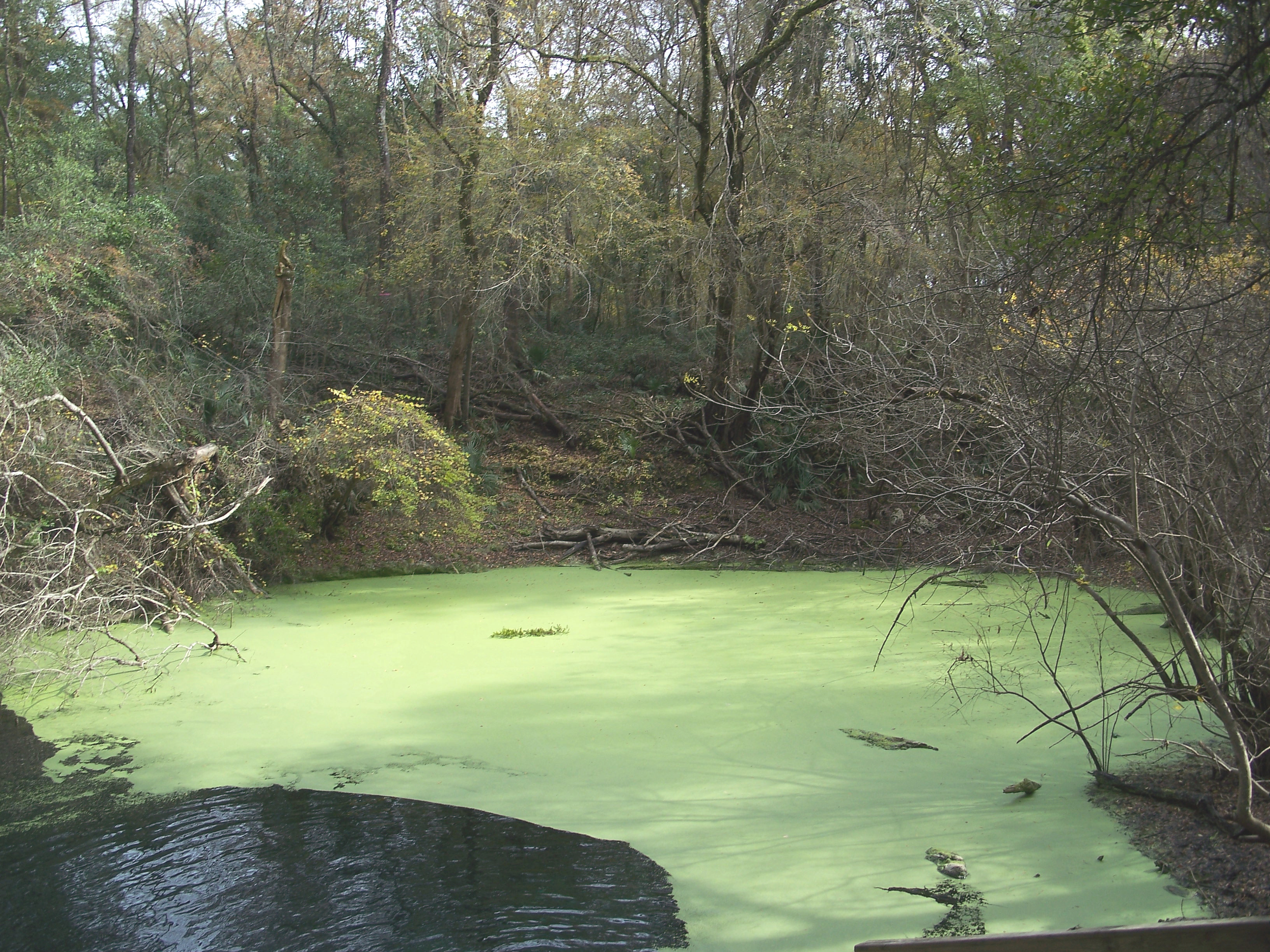
Orange Grove Sink with algae (2009)

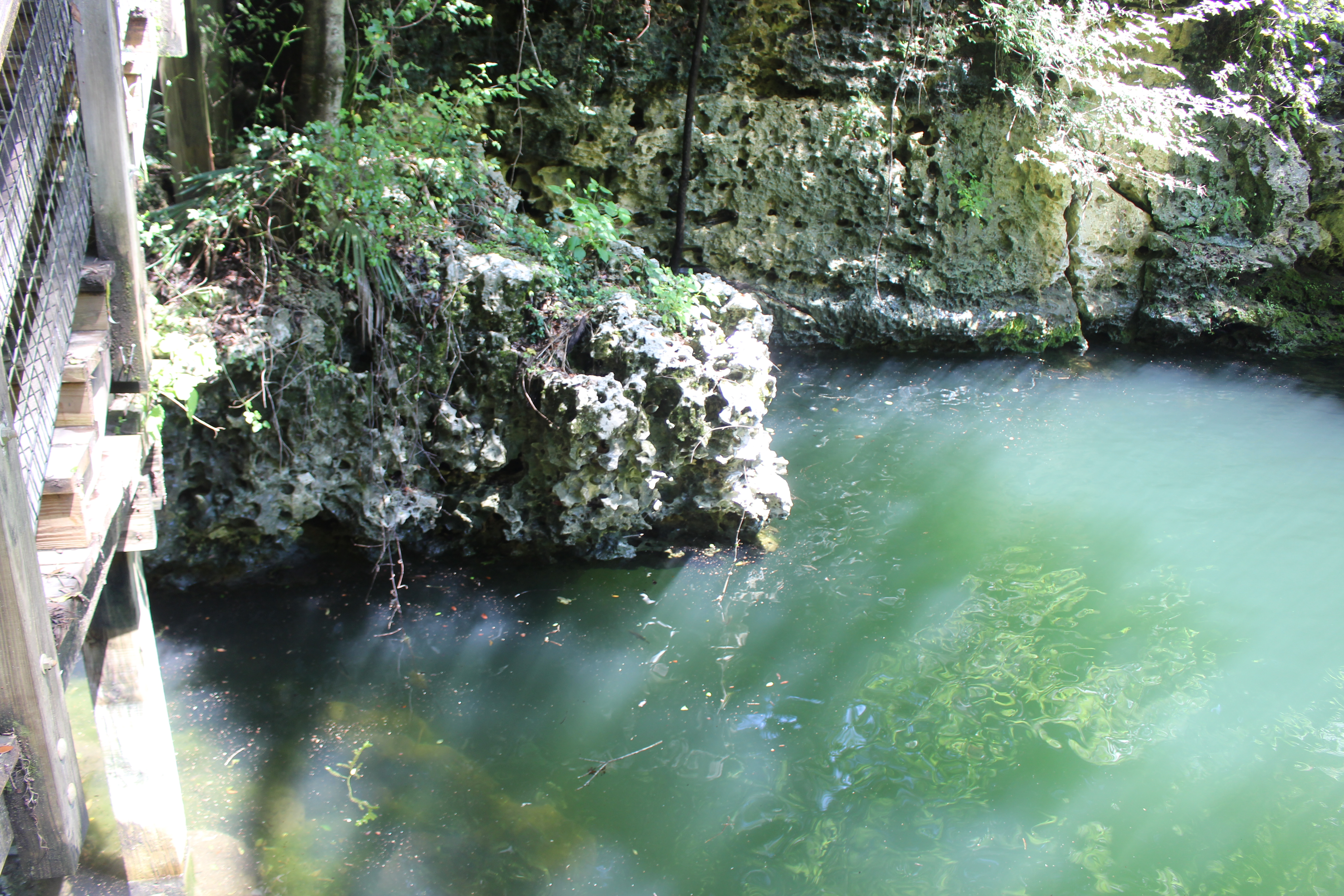
Orange Grove Sink without algae (2022)

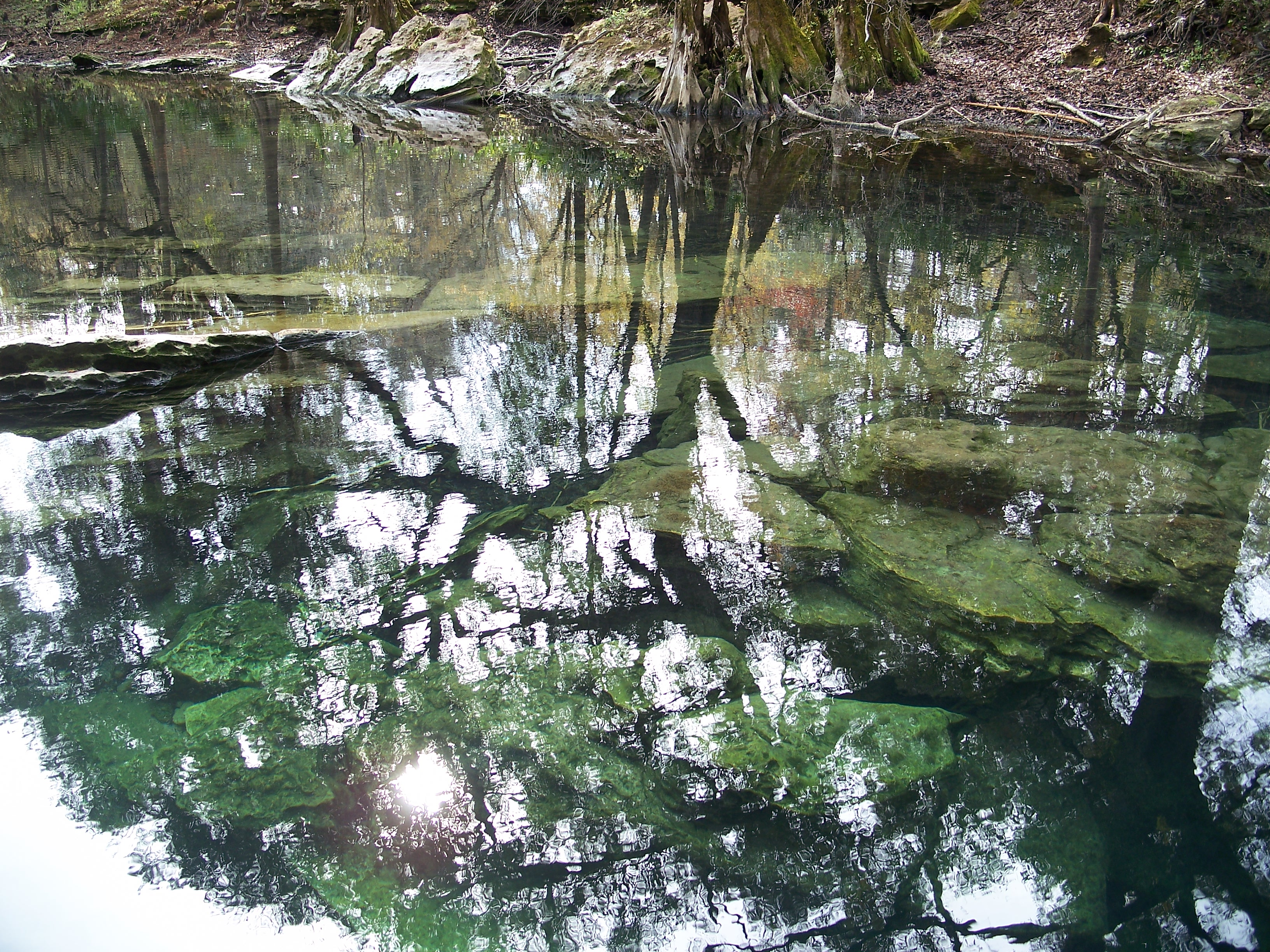
Spring I

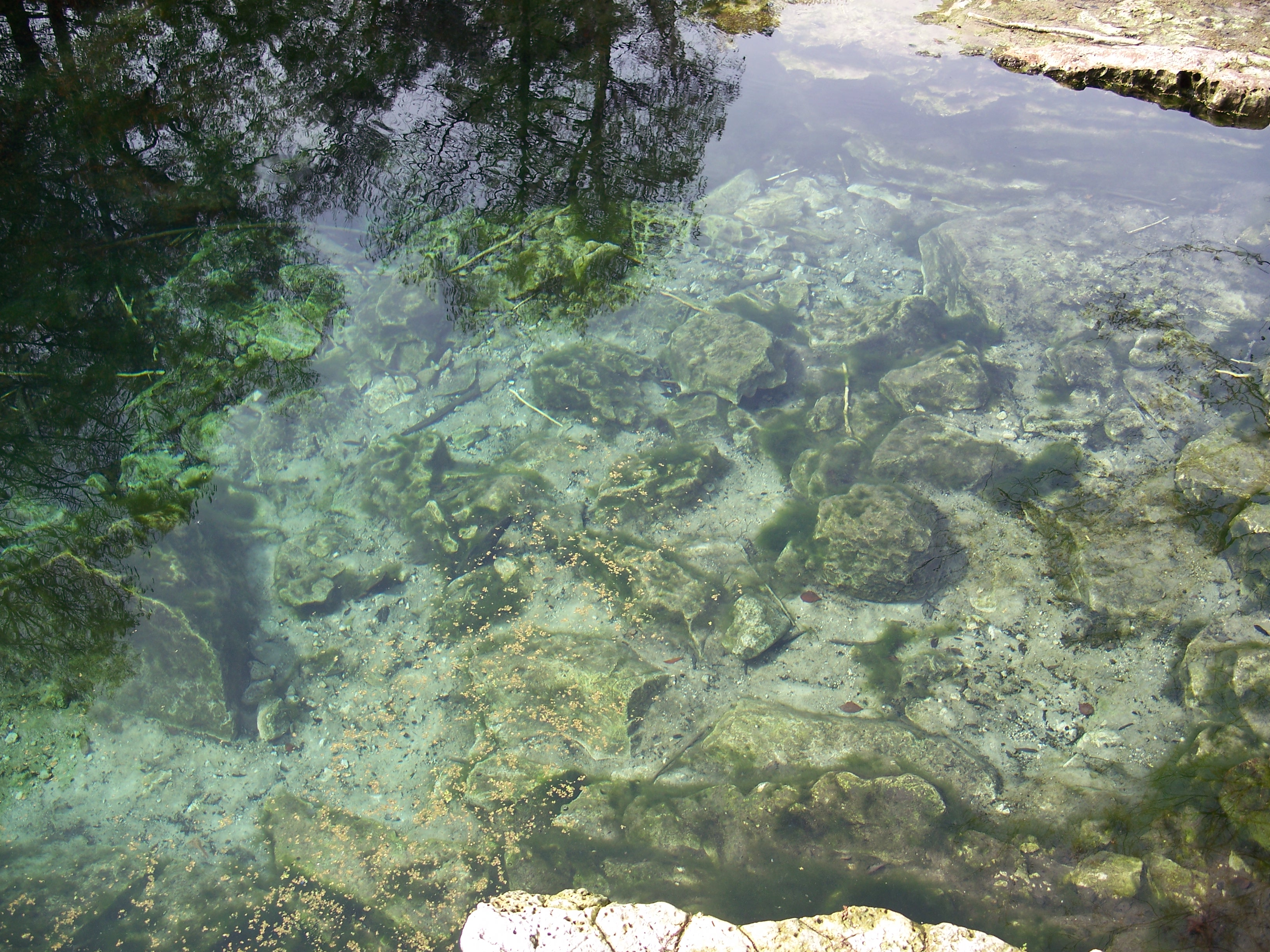
Spring II
