= Sydney Speleological Society =

The Sydney Speleological Society Inc. (SSS) is a caving group based in Sydney, Australia. The Sydney Speleological Society was founded in 1954 and is one of the oldest caving groups in Australia. The Sydney Speleological Society has organised caving expeditions both locally and internationally. The Sydney Speleological Society has participated in events regarding caving, caving standards, caving publications, caving equipment, caving safety, and cave rescue. The Society also participated in the founding of the Australian Speleological Federation.

The Sydney Speleological Society has published many books on caving and caving areas in Australia and continues to work on many projects to further the understanding of caving and karst areas in Australia and overseas. These achievements have included developing communication and navigation equipment for caving, leading excavations of caves, mapping and indexing caves in Australia, and publishing articles about cave meteorology.

The Sydney Speleological Society publishes a monthly journal that documents the many activities of the Society and caving in general. The Journal has been in continuous publication for over 50 years, making it one of the oldest continually published caving journals in Australia with over 630 editions. This publication is a reputable source of information on many aspects of caving in Australia and overseas.

== History ==
The Sydney Speleological Society was founded on March 23, 1954. The first meeting was held in the YMCA building on Pitt Street in Sydney. At the time, only two caving clubs existed in Australia.
