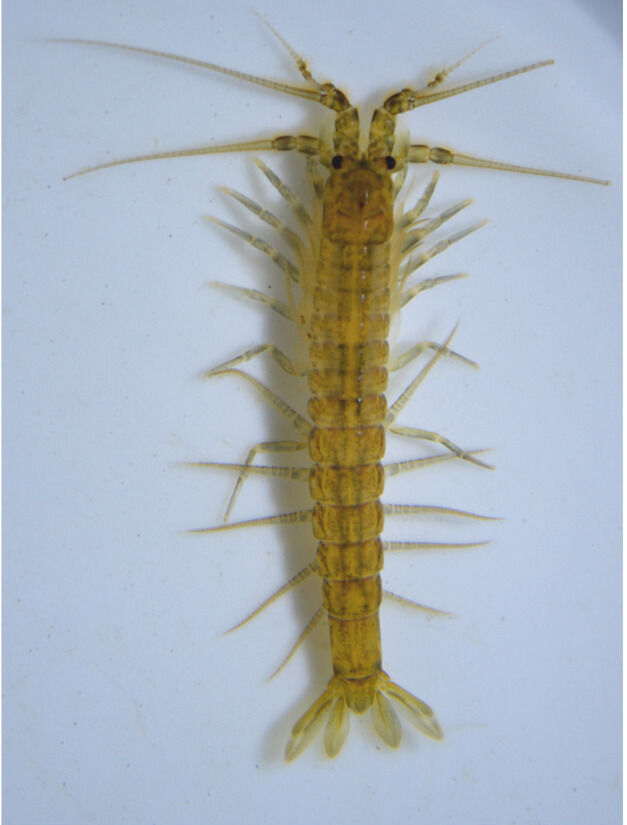

Scientific classification
- Kingdom: Animalia
- Phylum: Arthropoda
- Clade: Pancrustacea
- Class: Malacostraca
- Order: Anaspidacea
- Family: Anaspidesidae
- Genus: Anaspides
- Species: A. tasmaniae

Binomial name
- Anaspides tasmaniae Thomson, 1894

= Anaspides tasmaniae =

Species of crustacean

Anaspides tasmaniae is a species of freshwater crustacean found in Tasmania. Members of the genus Anaspides are commonly known as Tasmanian mountain shrimp. Mountain shrimp are often referred to as “living fossils” since they have remained morphologically largely unchanged for over 200 million years.

== Taxonomy ==
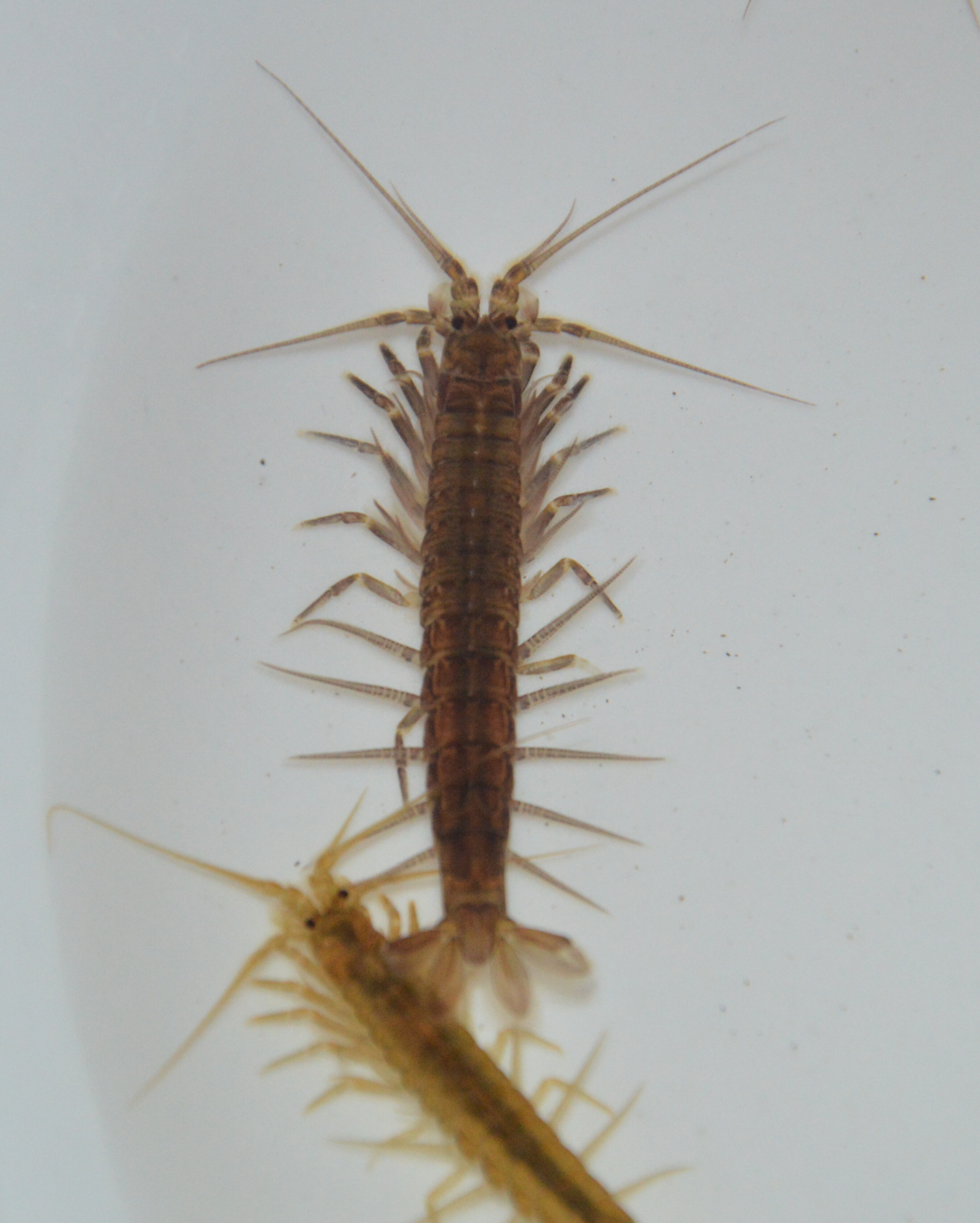
Two Anaspides tasmaniae

Anaspides tasmaniae was described by George Malcolm Thomson in 1894 on the basis of specimens collected from the summit of Mount Wellington, Tasmania. Thomson suggested a new genus (Anaspides) and a new family (Anaspidea) due to the animal’s unique characteristics. The name Anaspides refers to the total absence of a carapace and is derived from the Ancient Greek ἀν (“an” - lacking) and ἀσπίς (“aspis” - shield).

Anaspides tasmaniae is the type species for the genus, which now includes eight species of mountain shrimp.

Despite the common name, mountain shrimp are not true shrimp as they are not members of the order Decapoda. Recent molecular data place them as a sister group to the Euphausiacea (krill).

== Description ==
Anaspides tasmaniae can reach up to 35mm in length from the tip of the rostrum to the end of the telson. Its colour varies from light to medium brown. This species can be distinguished from similar species in the genus by the combination of the following features: eyes with a well-developed cornea, an elongated telson with an evenly rounded posterior margin, the form of the antennular inner flagellum and, in males, the presence of two antennular clasping spines.

== Distribution and habitat ==
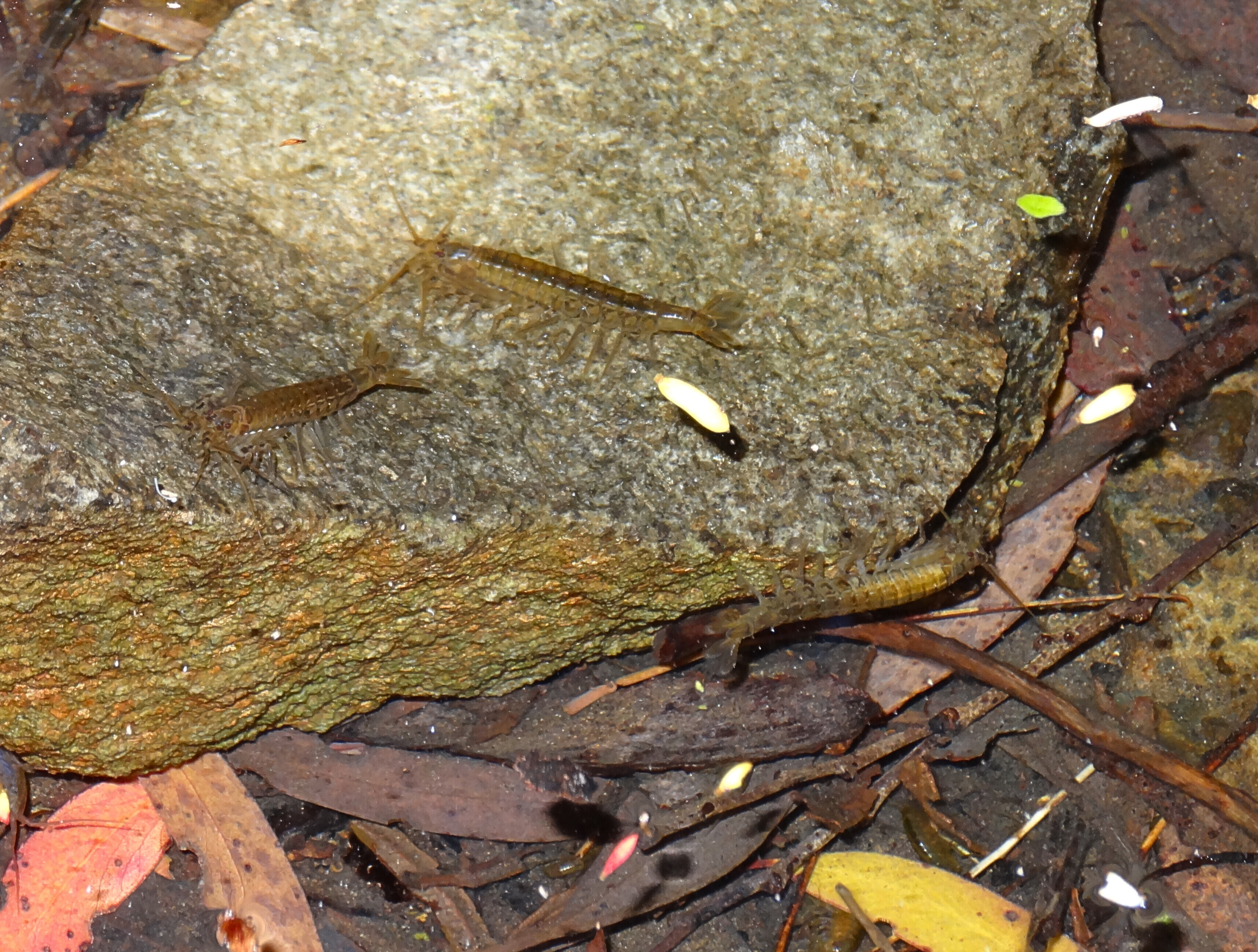
Anaspides tasmaniae in the wild

Anaspides tasmaniae was previously thought to occur across Tasmania but recent studies indicate that its distribution is limited to creeks, runnels and pools in just two areas: on the east and south-east sides of kunanyi/Mount Wellington up to 970m above sea level as well as in and near Mount Field National Park. It is mainly known from surface habitats; unlike some other members of Anaspides, the species is rarely found to live in underground cave environments. The species has not been recorded on Mount Wellington Plateau (above 970m) in recent decades, likely due to changes in the habitat following major bushfires in the 1930s.

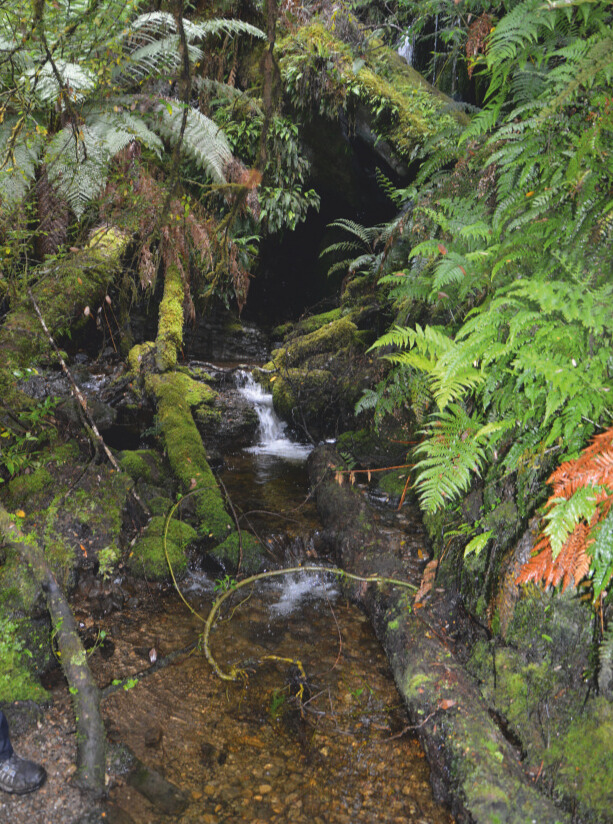
One habitat where Anaspides tasmaniae is found

Like all members of Anaspides, Anaspides tasmaniae is restricted to a narrow range of temperatures. Its current known altitude range is 320m to 970m above sea level. Its distribution is strongly influenced by Pleistocene glaciations which formed the alpine habitats where it occurs today. The two regions where the species persists are post glacial relicts, indicating that the species inhabited a wider range during glacial periods.

== Conservation status ==
Anaspides tasmaniae is not currently included on state or federal lists of threatened fauna. The species is considered to be vulnerable in light of new data on its limited geographic range. Scientists have noted the need for reassessment of its conservation status.

== In literature ==
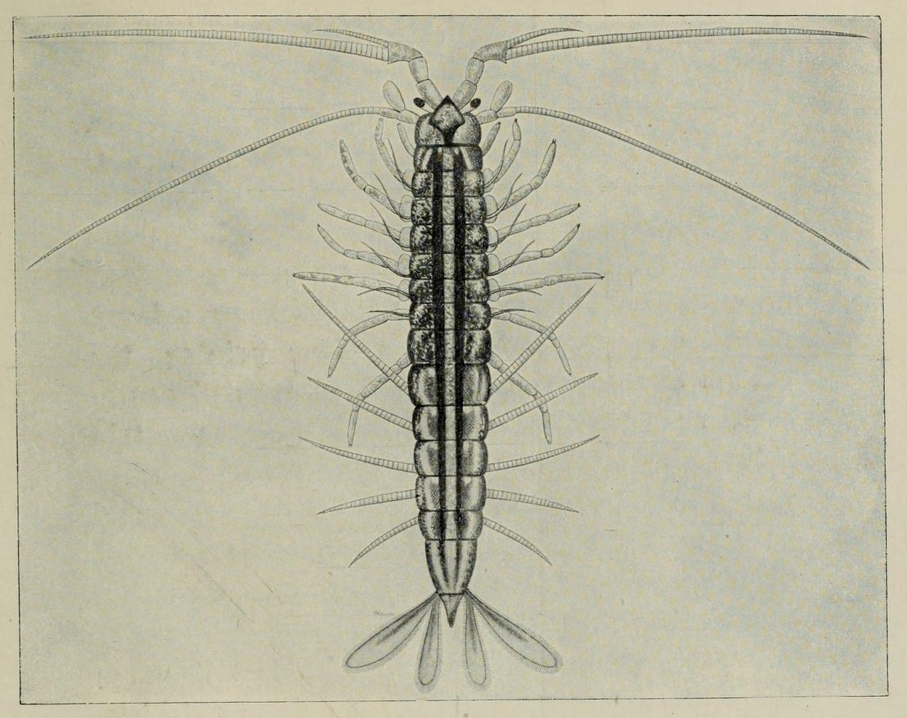
Sketch of Anaspides tasmaniae from Geoffrey Smith's "A Naturalist in Tasmania", 1909

In 1907 zoologist Geoffrey Watkins Smith arrived in Tasmania to study the island’s freshwater crustaceans. In his 1909 book “A Naturalist in Tasmania” he describes his first encounter with Anaspides tasmaniae:

Goethe somewhere remarks that the most insignificant natural object is, as it were, a window through which we can look into infinity. And certainly when I first saw the Mountain Shrimp walking quietly about in its crystal-clear habitations, as if nothing of any great consequence had happened since its ancestors walked in a sea peopled with strange reptiles, by a shore on which none but cold-blooded creatures plashed among the rank forests of fern-like trees, before ever bird flew or youngling was suckled with milk, time for me was annihilated and the imposing kingdom of man shrunk indeed to a little measure.

— Geoffrey Watkins Smith, A Naturalist in Tasmania, page 71
