= Newcastle and Hunter Valley Speleological Society =

Caving cluib in Newcastle, Australia

Newcastle and Hunter Valley Speleological Society Inc.
- Abbreviation: NHVSS
- Formation: 1 May 1984; 41 years ago
- Location: Newcastle, New South Wales, Australia
- Affiliations: Australian Speleological Federation
- Website: NHVSS Website
- Logo design J.Whitby, adopted 30 July 1998

Newcastle and Hunter Valley Speleological Society (NHVSS) is a caving club based in Newcastle, New South Wales (NSW), Australia.

== History ==
The Newcastle and Hunter Valley Speleological Society formed in May 1984. The Society became an "Associate Member" of the Australian Speleological Federation in late 1984 and a full "Corporate Member" in January 1986. The Society's first organised trip in June 1984, was a weekend of simulated cave rescues at the Timor Caves, located around 150 km North-West of Newcastle in the Hunter Valley.

NHVSS became part of the World Wide Web with the setting up of the society's website in mid 1999. This allowed members to access information on upcoming trips and provided contact details for like minded members of the public. Then during 2003, NHVSS became an Incorporated Society, registered with the 'NSW Department of Fair Trading'.

In 2004, NHVSS received a NSW Environmental Education Community Grant to fund research and publish an up-to-date educational resource book on the Timor Karst and Caves. Research field work was carried out between February 2005 and October 2007 with assistance of members from several other organisations and speleological societies. During the field work, an additional 27 new caves were discovered and documented. The book 'Timor Caves - Hunter Valley, New South Wales' was published in August 2008.

In July 2009 the NHVSS lodged a class 1 appeal with the NSW Land and Environment Court (L&EC), objecting to the granting of a limestone quarry approval at Timor in the upper Hunter Valley, NSW. The NSW Environmental Defender's Office acted on behalf of NHVSS in appealing the "Stoneco Pty Ltd" limestone quarry approval by the Upper Hunter Shire Council. L&EC hearings were held during November 2009 and again in May 2010. The court granted consent for the quarry to proceed in June 2010, provided that strict monitoring protocols were implemented and imposed many additional conditions focused on the protection of Timor karst values and biodiversity covering the project site during the life of the quarry. The conditions imposed by the L&EC set an important precedent for the types of conditions which may be imposed on similar quarries and mines in the future, and the case has since been quoted in numerous development applications for coal, mineral and metal mines in NSW.

== Activities ==
The society's activities include; exploration, survey, documentation, research and conservation of caves and karst. NHVSS has been involved in speleothem research in Australia, palaeoclimate research on the Indonesian islands of Flores and Sulawesi, Atiu - Cook Islands and cave exploration diving. During 2018 the society assisted on palaeontology research expeditions to caves in the Upper Hunter Valley NSW Australia, resulting in discoveries of significant Quaternary fossils, including five extinct Pleistocene megafaunal taxa. A number of other research projects (e.g. bat monitoring, glow-worm distribution and groundwater fauna) have been undertaken by the society at various cave and karst locations in NSW.

Since 2011, the speleological society has regularly assisted Newcastle University lecturers, by guiding geology students through the Timor Caves, on field excursions. The excursions provide students with a better understanding of cave geomorphology and highlights specific geological features covered in the university course.

Currently the NHVSS have members engaged in a programme of exploration and surveying Bullita Caves within Gregory National Park, Northern Territory, which to date has over 300 km of surveyed passage, making it amongst the longest underground systems in the world.

NHVSS members undertake a diverse range of activities, catering for a wide range of skill levels, from beginners to hard core veteran cavers. Horizontal and vertical caving skills of members, are kept up to date through regular training days. Other activities include canyoning, bushwalking and occasionally cross country skiing and white water kayaking.

== Publications ==
Newcaves Chronicles, ISSN 1325-0930. Newcastle and Hunter Valley Speleological Society Inc. Published twice yearly since August 1993.

Timor Caves - Hunter Valley, New South Wales, (2008). ISBN 9780646492858.
