= Exit Cave =

Cave in Tasmania, Australia

- Location within Tasmania
- Location: Southern Tasmania, Australia

Exit Cave, Tasmania is a large multi entrance cave near Ida bay in southern Tasmania.

The cave is one of a number of caves along the D’Entrecasteaux River, and the system has a number of sump caves. It is a candidate for the longest cave in Australia. Another contender for this title is Bullita Cave in the Northern Territory although as the cave remains not fully mapped there is no certainty which cave holds the record.

The cave is part of the Ida Bay karst system and within the Tasmanian Wilderness World Heritage Area and is home to a "diverse and significant" cave fauna numerous species.

Species found include:

- Goedetrechus mendumae
- Anaspides tasmaniae
