= Whowie =

Australian Aboriginal mythological creature

Creature information
- Grouping: Legendary creature
- Sub grouping: Reptile
- Folklore: Australian Aboriginal mythology

Origin
- Country: Australia
- Region: Riverina, South Australia
- Habitat: Riverbanks

The Whowie, a fearsome creature from southeast Australian Aboriginal mythology, resembled a seven-metre long goanna with a huge frog-shaped head and six powerful legs. He lived in a cave on the banks of the Murray River that extended deep below the ground, and his trampling on the riverbanks outside his cave formed the sandhills of the Riverina district. Although slow, the Whowie was extremely stealthy and could kill and devour a whole tribe in a single meal.

The water rat tribe, having finally had enough of their suffering at the hands of the Whowie, instructed all the tribes in the area to gather together spears, stone axes, waddies, and many bundles of sticks. With the Whowie at the far end of his cave, they stacked the bundles in a great heap at the entrance and set them alight. After seven days the Whowie finally emerged, blinded and disorientated by the smoke, and the tribes succeeding in killing him with their weapons and freeing the land from a terrible menace.

== Explanations and localisation ==
Real-life encounters with ancient Australian megafauna such as the Megalania may have inspired the myth of the Whowie.

In a 2021 Caves Australia article, Karl Brandt proposed the Punyelroo Cave as the location of the Whowie’s lair. The first recorder of the story, David Unaipon, collected traditional tales from his own Ngarrindjeri people of the lower Murray River in South Australia, part of the Riverina bioregion. The cave stretches for approximately three kilometres into a sandstone cliff on the riverbank while no significant cave system has been discovered on the Murray River in New South Wales.

== See also ==
- Bunyip, a river monster from the aboriginal mythology of southeastern Australia
- Mungoon-Gali, a giant goanna from Australian Aboriginal mythology
