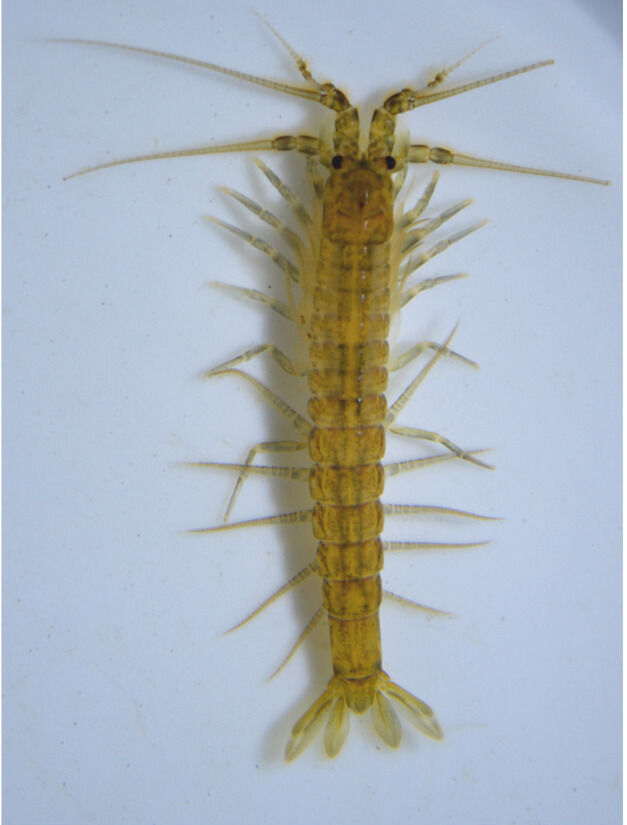
- Anaspides tasmaniae

Scientific classification
- Kingdom: Animalia
- Phylum: Arthropoda
- Clade: Pancrustacea
- Class: Malacostraca
- Order: Anaspidacea
- Family: Anaspidesidae; Ahyong & Alonso-Zarazaga, 2017

Genera
- Allanaspides Swain, Wilson, Hickman & Ong, 1970; Anaspides Thomson, 1894; Paranaspides Smith, 1908

Synonyms
- Anaspididae Thomson, 1893 (preoccupied)

= Anaspidesidae =

Anaspidesidae Temporal range: Triassic–Recent

Family of crustaceans

Anaspidesidae is a family of freshwater crustaceans that is endemic to Tasmania, Australia. The family contains 3 living genera. This group of crustaceans are considered living fossils. They are commonly and collectively known as the Tasmanian anaspid crustaceans.

This family is originally called as Anaspididae. However, genus name Anaspis was preoccupied by the insect genus, Anaspis Geoffroy, 1762, and therefore, in 2017, the family was renamed to Anaspidesidae by Shane Ahyong and Miguel A. Alonso-Zarazaga.

Anaspiesids have stalked eyes, long antennae and antennules, and a slender body with no carapace. The two species of Allanaspides and the single species of Paranaspides are all listed as vulnerable on the IUCN Red List.

== Taxonomy ==
After Höpel et al. (2023)

- Allanaspides Swain, Wilson, Hickman & Ong, 1970
  - Allanaspides hickmani Swain, Wilson & Ong, 1970 – commonly known as Hickman's pygmy mountain shrimp
  - Allanaspides helonomus Swain, Wilson, Hickman & Ong, 1970
- Anaspides Thomson, 1894
  - Anaspides tasmaniae Thomson, 1892
  - Anaspides spinulae Williams, 1965
  - Anaspides jarmani Ahyong, 2015
  - Anaspides clarkei Ahyong, 2015
  - Anaspides swaini Ahyong, 2015
  - Anaspides driesseni Höpel, Richter & Ahyong, 2023
  - Anaspides richardsoni Ahyong, 2016
  - Anaspides eberhardi Ahyong, 2016
- Paranaspides Smith, 1908
  - Paranaspides lacustris Smith, 1909
  - Paranaspides williamsi Ahyong, Schwentner & Richter, 2017
- †Anaspidites Brooks, 1962 (Hawkesbury sandstone, Triassic)
  - †Anaspidites antiquus (Chilton, 1929)
- †Koonaspides Jell & Duncan, 1986 (Koonwarra fossil bed, Aptian, Early Cretaceous)
  - †Koonaspides indistinctus Jell & Duncan, 1986
