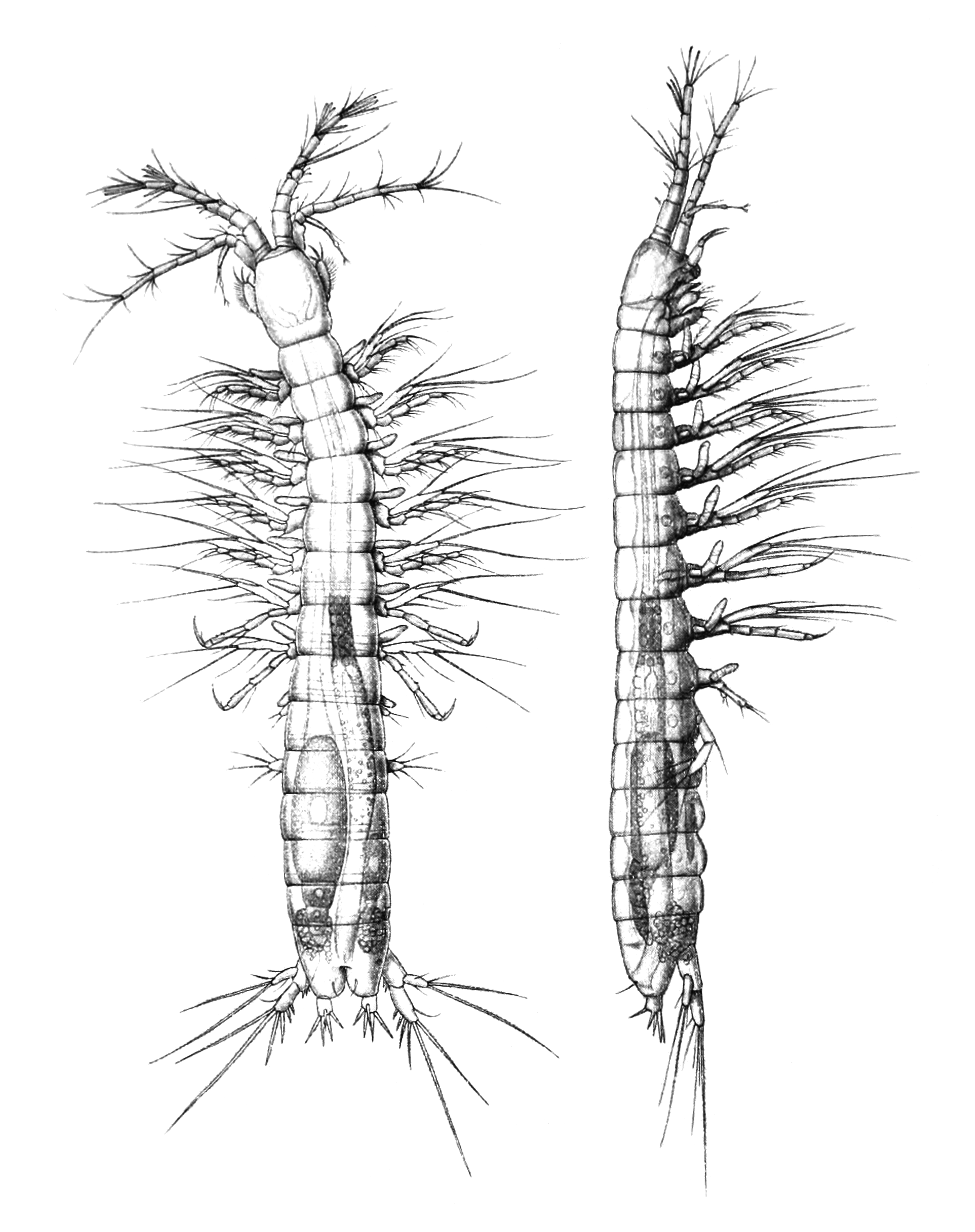
- Bathynella chappuisi

Scientific classification
- Kingdom: Animalia
- Phylum: Arthropoda
- Class: Malacostraca
- Superorder: Syncarida
- Order: Bathynellacea; Chappuis, 1915

Families
- Bathynellidae Grobben, 1905; Parabathynellidae Noodt, 1965

= Bathynellacea =

Order of crustaceans

Bathynellacea is an order of crustaceans which live interstitially in groundwater. Some species can tolerate low salt concentrations, and at least one African species is a thermophile, living in hot springs and tolerating temperatures up to 55 °C (131 °F). Bathynellaceans are minute, blind, worm-like animals with short, weak legs, reaching a maximum size of 3.4 millimetres (0.13 in). They are found on every continent except Antarctica, although they are missing from some islands, including Fiji, New Caledonia and the Caribbean islands. There are two families, Bathynellidae and Parabathynellidae; a third family, "Leptobathynellidae", is considered a synonym of Parabathynellidae.
