= Victorian Speleological Association =

Australian caving organization

The Victorian Speleological Association Inc. (VSA) was created in 1967 by the merger of the Victorian Cave Exploration Society (1957) and the Sub Aqua Speleological Society (1960). It is a member of the Australian Speleological Federation (ASF) which is in turn part of the International Union of Speleology. The Association aims to explore and chart the extensive cave systems in Victoria (Australia) and elsewhere, represent the interests of Victorian cavers to the relevant authorities and to encourage the preservation of caves in their natural state. There are over 800 caves in Victoria, many of them on private property. In addition to its exploration, campaigning and conservation work the Association's members oversee recreational expeditions underground for the general public.

The VSA has been actively involved with the exploration of sinkholes and caves at Nullarbor Plain. These have proved a rich source of megafauna fossils and the Association was instrumental in the discovery and recovery of a rare Thylacoleo skeleton in 2002. The significance of such discoveries was great enough to warrant a special report on the ABC science show, Catalyst which aired on Australian television in 2006.

Currently the VSA have members engaged in a programme of exploration and surveying in the Bullita Caves in the Gregory National Park, Northern Territory, which, at over 100 km, is one of the longest underground systems in the world. It has also carried out an extensive period of exploration and surveying in the famous Buchan Caves.

The role of the VSA in exploration and conservation is acknowledged in the Mount Eccles National Park and Mount Napier State Plan and Snowy River National Park Management Plan, while their publications are cited by Australian State Government agencies in guides to various cave systems.
