= Bullita Cave =

Cave in Northern Territory, Australia

- Location within Australia
- Location: Northern Territory, Australia
- Coordinates: 16°03′48″S 130°23′00″E
- Length: 120 kilometres (75 mi) — 123 kilometres (76 mi)
- Geology: Karst

Bullita Cave, also known as Burkes Backyard Cave, is a cave located in Gregory National Park of the Northern Territory, Australia. It is one of the longest surveyed caves in both Australia and the world.

== Location and structure ==
Bullita Cave is part of a network of caves located close together within Gregory National Park. Major caves close to it include Dingo Cave System, which is 38.5 kilometres (23.9 mi) away, and Prometheus Cave System, which is 46.5 kilometres (28.9 mi) away; multiple smaller caves are located near Bullita Cave as well. The cave has multiple entrances and is located underneath a field of limestone pavement which is over 30 kilometres (19 mi) in length. The cave contains a large number of holes which open up at the surface, revealing daylight, and some whole sections which are completely exposed, as well as fissures within its tunnels. Beneath the Surface: A Natural History of Australian Caves describes the cave as a "complex close-spaced maze system."

== Exploration ==
Operation Raleigh investigated the cave in an expedition in 1990; this was the first time that it was significantly explored. In 1992, further sections of the cave were found. John Dunkley, an educator and caver who is currently a member of the Australian Speleological Federation, explored and observed the cave throughout the late 20th and early 21st century. He began surveying it in the 1990s and continued to do so until 2008, stating that a cave with as large of a size as Bullita would take a long time to survey. He discovered multiple features and statistics about the cave during his exploration.

== Length ==
Bullita Cave, as surveyed, is one of the longest caves currently known in Australia, with multiple older sources claiming it is the longest cave in the country. The exact length of the cave varies across different sources; the Encyclopedia of Caves and Karst Science claims that the cave was known to be 81.9 kilometres (50.9 mi) in length in March 2003, while the book Beneath the Surface: A Natural History of Australian Caves, also written in 2003, states that the cave is slightly longer, containing a total of 88 kilometres (55 mi) of tunnels known at the time. However, later studies have shown that the cave has over 100 kilometres (62 mi) of tunnels. Even in these later studies, the exact number still varies between sources; the book Caves for the Uninitiated states that the known length of the cave in August 2011 was 120.4 kilometres (74.8 mi), while John Dunkley's observations showed the cave as having a total length of more than 122 kilometres (76 mi) and a journal article published in 2016 states that the cave is 123 kilometres (76 mi) in length.

Bullita Cave is also one of the longest caves in the world. The exact position of the cave on the list of longest caves also varies across sources; the Encyclopedia of Caves and Karst Science names it as the 18th longest while Caves for the Uninitiated claims it's the 15th. The cave covers a total area of 4 kilometres (2.5 mi).

== See also ==
- List of longest caves
