= Stygocarididae =

Scientific classification
- Domain: Eukaryota
- Kingdom: Animalia
- Phylum: Arthropoda
- Class: Malacostraca
- Order: Anaspidacea
- Family: Stygocarididae

Family of crustaceans

Stygocarididae is a family of crustaceans belonging to the order Anaspidacea.

Genera:

- Oncostygocaris Schminke, 1980
- Parastygocaris Noodt, 1963
- Stygocarella Schminke, 1980
- Stygocaris Noodt, 1963
