= Bathynellidae =

Scientific classification
- Domain: Eukaryota
- Kingdom: Animalia
- Phylum: Arthropoda
- Class: Malacostraca
- Order: Bathynellacea
- Family: Bathynellidae; Grobben, 1904

Type genus
- Bathynella Vejdovsky, 1882

Family of crustaceans

Bathynellidae is a family of crustaceans belonging to the order Bathynellacea, first described by Karl Grobben in 1905.

== Genera ==
The World Register of Marine Species recognises the following genera in family Bathynellidae:

- Agnathobathynella Schminke, 1980
- Antrobathynella Serban, 1966
- Austrobathynella Delmare Deboutteville & Serban, 1973
- Baicalobathynella Birstein & Ljovuschkin, 1967
- Bathynella Vejdovksy, 1882
- Camachobathynella Ranga Reddy, Shaik & Totakura, 2015
- Clamousella Serban, Coineau & Delamare Deboutteville, 1971
- Delamareibathynella Serban, 1992
- Gallobathynella Serban, Coineau & Delamare Deboutteville, 1971
- Hispanobathynella Serban, 1989
- Hobbsinella Camacho, Hutchins, Schwartz, Dorda, Casado & Rey, 2017
- Indobathynella Ranga Reddy & Totakura, 2012
- Meridiobathynella Serban, Coineau & Delamare Deboutteville, 1971
- Morimotobathynella Serban, 2000
- Nannobathynella Noodt, 1969
- Nilobathynella Serban, 2000
- Pacificabathynella Schminke, 1988
- Paradoxibathynella Serban, 2000
- Paradoxiclamousella Camacho, Dorda & Rey, 2013
- Parameridiobathynella Serban & Leclerc, 1984
- Parauenobathynella Serban, 2000
- Pseudantrobathynella Schminke, 1988
- Pseudobathynella Serban, Coineau & Delamare Deboutteville, 1971
- Sardobathynella Serban, 1973
- Serbanibathynella Ranga Reddy & Schminke, 2005
- Tianschanobathynella Serban, 1993
- Transkeithynella Serban & Coineau, 1975
- Transvaalthynella Serban & Coineau, 1975
- Uenobathynella Serban, 2000
- Vandelibathynella Serban, Coineau & Delamare Deboutteville, 1971
- Vejdovskybathynella Serban & Leclerc, 1984

Additional genera according to the Australian Faunal Directory:

- Fortescuenella Perina & Camacho, 2019
- Pilbaranella Perina & Camacho, 2018
