= Sydney University Speleological Society =

- Abbreviation: SUSS
- Formation: 1948
- Headquarters: University of Sydney
- Parent organization: University of Sydney Union
- Website: suss.caves.org.au

Sydney University Speleological Society (SUSS) is a caving group based in Sydney, Australia, which aims to unite University of Sydney graduates, undergraduates, staff and all other people who are interested in the exploration and mapping of cave systems. The society fosters speleology as a science and sport and co-operates with other bodies in the furtherance of these aims. SUSS was founded in 1948 and is the oldest caving group on mainland Australia (and second-oldest in the country, having formed two years after the Tasmanian Caverneering Club). It has been heavily involved in the exploration and mapping of various Australian cave systems since its formation. The society pioneered the sport of cave diving in Australia and was a founding member of the Australian Speleological Federation.

== History ==
The Sydney University Speleological Society was formed in 1948 as a splinter group of the Sydney University Bushwalking club with Jak Kelly as its inaugural president. The society is the oldest caving group in mainland Australia and was involved the early exploration and documentation of many caving areas in New South Wales.

The society has spent significant amounts of time exploring the Jenolan Caves to the west of Sydney, and have published two books on the area. It was also involved in the discovery of many major additions including Spider cave, Wiburds lake cave, and the diving of Imperial cave.

== Publications ==
The Sydney University Speleological Society has published several books on Australian caves and caving, including:

- The Exploration and Speleogeography of Mammoth Cave, Jenolan
- The Caves of Jenolan 2: The Northern Limestone
- Tuglow Caves

The Society also publishes a regular bulletin.

== Notable members ==
- Jak Kelly
- Al Warild
- Ron Allum
- David Apperley
