= Western Australian Speleological Group =

Speleological group based in Western Australia

The Western Australian Speleological Group (WASG) is a speleological group based in Nedlands, Western Australia. It was created in 1958 to promote speleology, scientific investigation, and the fostering and preservation of caves in Western Australia. As Western Australia's largest caving group, WASG continually arranges caving expeditions to undertake cave surveys, implement rehabilitation measures, and work to enable better access to caves. Earlier speleology in Western Australia had been done by the Western Australian Museum. Some published material identifies their parent organisation, the Australian Speleological Federation, rather than WASG, in their appraisals.

== Formation ==
In the early 1950's, several members of the Western Australian Naturalists Club, formed a group called the Western Australian Caving Group. The group was primarily formed to explore caves within Yanchep with emphasis on caving as a sport, although certain members were interested in speleology. The group later dissolved.

In early 1958, a few of the original members helped form a new group - the Western Australian Speleological Group, as part of the Naturalists Club, later affiliating with the Australian Speleological Federation in December.

== Publications ==
The organisation has a newsletter, the W.A.S.G. Informer, and a journal, The Western Caver. The journal, originally titled with reference to the Naturalists Club, was published every two months until 1974 then every quarter until 1985, and has since been released annually.
