= Psammaspididae =

Scientific classification
- Domain: Eukaryota
- Kingdom: Animalia
- Phylum: Arthropoda
- Class: Malacostraca
- Order: Anaspidacea
- Family: Psammaspididae; Schminke, 1974

Family of crustaceans

Psammaspididae is a family of crustaceans belonging to the order Anaspidacea.

Genera:

- Eucrenonaspides Knott & Lake, 1980
- Psammaspides Schminke, 1974
