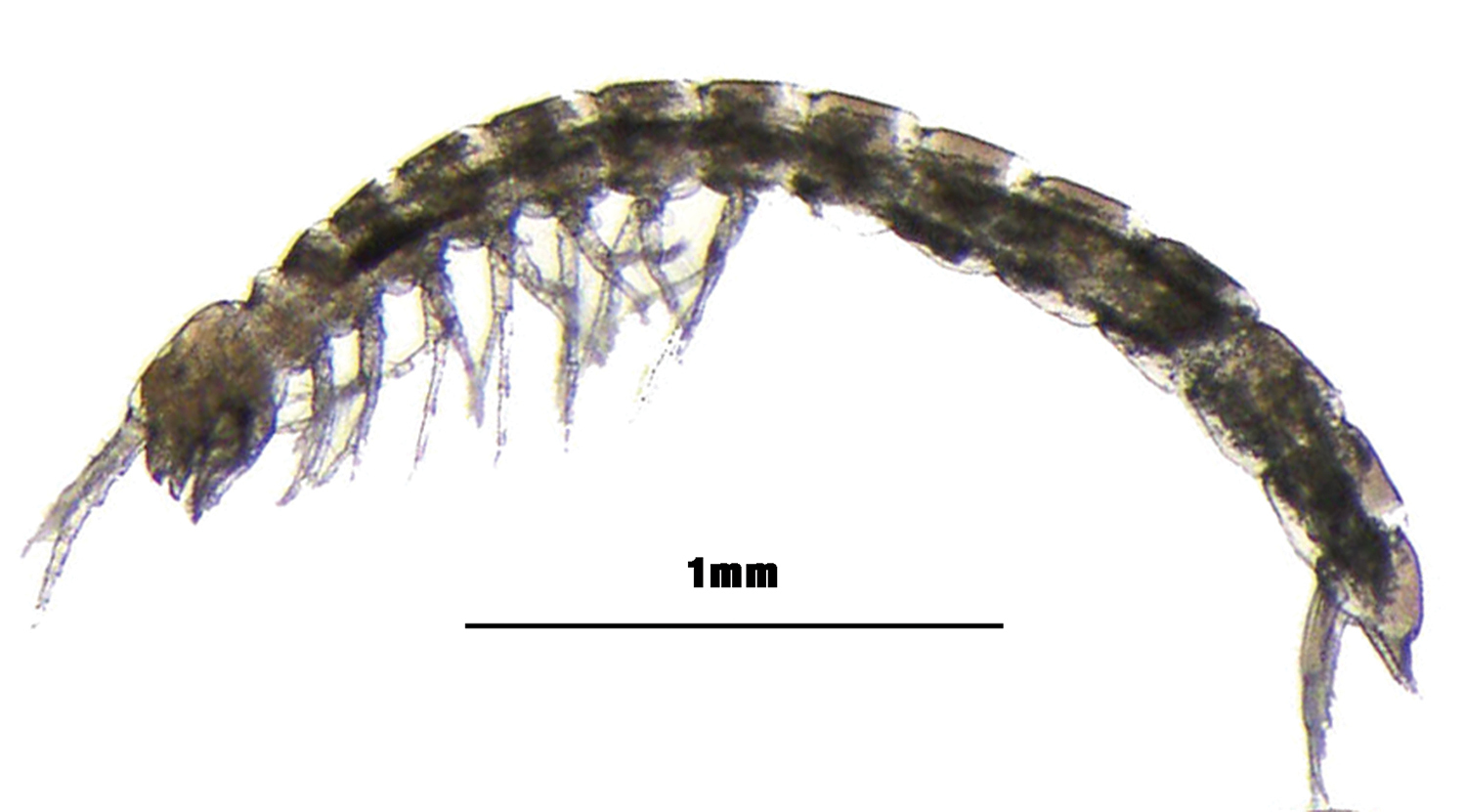
- Paraiberobathynella cf. fagei

Scientific classification
- Domain: Eukaryota
- Kingdom: Animalia
- Phylum: Arthropoda
- Class: Malacostraca
- Order: Bathynellacea
- Family: Parabathynellidae; Noodt, 1965

= Parabathynellidae =

Family of crustaceans

Parabathynellidae is a family of crustaceans belonging to the order Bathynellacea. These creatures are characterized by their slender bodies, reduced eyes, and elongated antennae. They are typically less than 1 mm in length, making them difficult to observe without the aid of a microscope. Parabathynellidae are found in freshwater habitats around the world, including streams, springs, caves, and aquifers.

Studies have shown that Parabathynellidae play an important role in freshwater ecosystems as they are key decomposers, consuming leaf litter and other organic matter that falls into the water. This consumption of organic matter contributes to the cycling of nutrients in the ecosystem, making Parabathynellidae an important link in the food chain.

== Genera ==
Genera:

- Acanthobathynella Coineau, 1967
- Afrobathynella Schminke, 1976
- Allobathynella Morimoto & Miura, 1957
- Arisubathynella Park & Eun, 2012
- Arkaroolabathynella Abrams & King, 2013
- Atopobathynella Schminke, 1973
- Batubathynella Schminke, 1973
- Billibathynella Cho, 2005
- Brasilibathynella Jakobi, 1958
- Brevisomabathynella Cho, Park & Ranga Reddy, 2006
- Califobathynella Cho, 1997
- Californibathynella Camacho & Serban, 1998
- Chilibathynella Noodt, 1963
- Cteniobathynella Schminke, 1973
- Ctenophallonella Coineau & Serban, 1978
- Eobathynella Birstein & Ljovuschkin, 1964
- Guadalopebathynella Camacho & Serban, 1998
- Habrobathynella Schminke, 1973
- Hangangbathynella Park & Cho, 2013
- Haplophallonella Serban & Coineau, 1975
- Heterodontobathynella Schminke, 1973
- Hexabathynella Schminke, 1972
- Hexaiberobathynella Camacho & Serban, 1998
- Iberobathynella Schminke, 1973
- Ipojucabathynella Schminke, 2011
- Issykkulibathynella Serban, 1994
- Kampucheabathynella Cho, Kry & Chhenh, 2015
- Kimberleybathynella Cho, Park & Humphreys, 2005
- Lamtobathynella Serban & Coineau, 1987
- Leptobathynella Noodt, 1965
- Lockyerenella Little & Camacho, 2017
- Megabathynella Camacho & Abrams, 2024
- Mekongbathynella Nam & Cho, 2014
- Montanabathynella Camacho, Newell & Stanford, 2009
- Nilobathynella Dumont, 1984
- Nipponbathynella Schminke, 1973
- Noodtibathynella Schminke, 1973
- Notobathynella Schminke, 1973
- Nunubathynella Schminke, 1976
- Octobathynella Camacho & Hancock, 2010
- Odontobathynella Delamare Deboutteville & Serban, 1979
- Onychobathynella Camacho & Hancock, 2012
- Parabathynella Chappuis, 1926
- Paraeobathynella Camacho, 2005
- Paraiberobathynella Camacho & Serban, 1998
- Parvulobathynella Schminke, 1973
- Psalidobathynella Schminke, 1979
- Racovitzaibathynella Serban & Coineau, 1994
- Sabahbathynella Schminke, 1988
- Siambathynella Camacho, Brancelj & Watyroiram, 2011
- Sinobathynella Camacho, Trontelj & Zagmajster, 2006
- Sketinella Camacho, 2005
- Texanobathynella Delamare Deboutteville, Coineau & Serban, 1975
- Thermobathynella Capart, 1951
