= Mount Picton =

Mountain in Tasmania, Australia

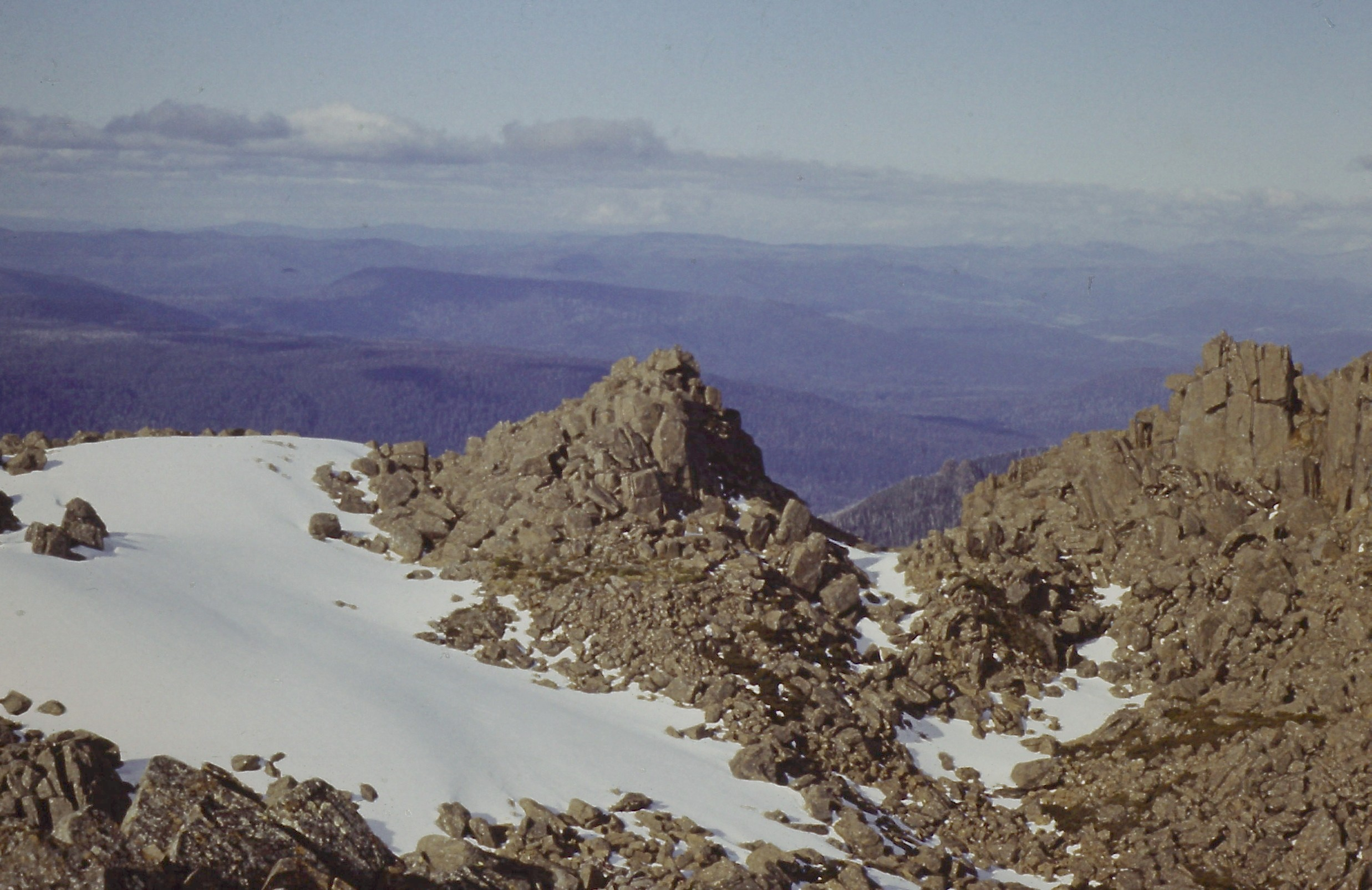

Highest point
- Elevation: 1,327 m (4,354 ft)
- Prominence: 1,024 m (3,360 ft)
- Parent peak: Mount Ossa
- Coordinates: 43°9′26″S 146°36′26″E

Geography
- Location within Tasmania
- Location: Tasmania, Australia

Mount Picton is a mountain of Southwest National Park located in Tasmania, Australia.
