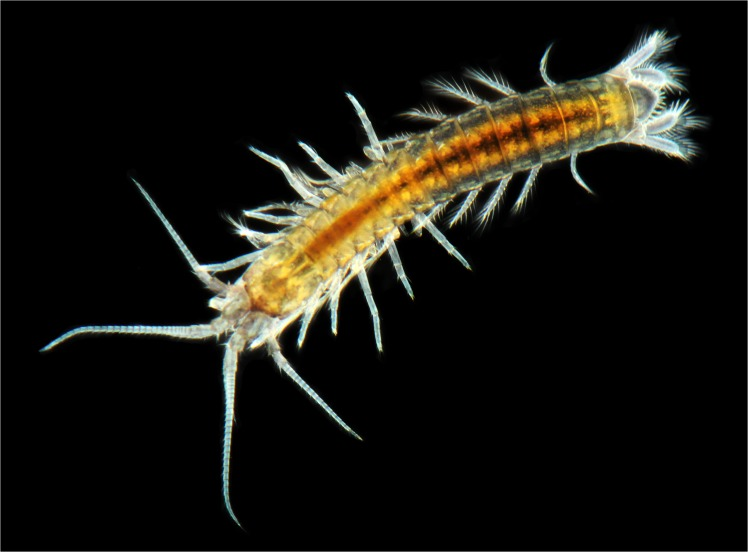
- Koonunga allambiensis

Scientific classification
- Kingdom: Animalia
- Phylum: Arthropoda
- Clade: Pancrustacea
- Class: Malacostraca
- Order: Anaspidacea
- Family: Koonungidae; 1907

= Koonungidae =

Family of crustaceans

Koonungidae is a family of crustaceans belonging to the order Anaspidacea.

Genera:

- Koonunga Sayce, 1907
- Micraspides Nicholls, 1931
