= Australian Speleological Federation =

Body for protection of Australia's caves

Formed in 1956, the Australian Speleological Federation Inc. (ASF) is the national body representing those interested in the protection and sustainability of Australia's cave and karst environments. It has approximately 950 members across 24 caving clubs throughout all Australian states and territories.

The ASF represents Australia within the International Union of Speleology, which is linked with UNESCO.

The federation is registered as an environmental organisation by the Department of the Environment and Energy, Canberra. The ASF maintains a public fund, authorised under the Income Tax Assessment Act 1997 item 6.1.1, subsection 30–55(1), to receive tax-deductible donations for its environmental purposes.

ASF works in environmental protection. Many members have largely recreational interests but have joined the federation to support its environmental objectives; others have primarily management, historical, scientific or academic interests in caves and karst. In all cases the federation's policies and guidelines influence the environmental practices of all cave users, i.e., managers, recreational cavers, tourists, scientists and adventurous visitors. Throughout Australia, codes developed by ASF, e.g., Ethics, Minimum Impact, Cave Classification, Documentation, Cave Diving and Safety, have been incorporated in land management plans both for caves and for broader karst parks.

ASF publishes Helictite: Journal of Australasian Speleological Research. One of only four or five such refereed scientific journals in the world, this publication has improved understanding of caves and karst, and in turn the standard of interpretation provided to the public by guides and rangers.

== Constitutional aims ==
- "To safeguard and protect the natural environment, specifically the cave and karst environment of Australia"
- "To gather and disseminate information, develop and promote policies, foster and publish research, and provide education and advice to the Australian community on conserving Australia's karst resources."
- To bring together and represent persons interested in caves and karst in Australia and the attainment of the Federation's aims"
- To foster speleology in all of its aspects"

Environmental objective

- "To promote conservation and sustainable management of Australia's caves and karst"

ASF's contribution to cave and karst protection

ASF has contributed to protection of the cave and karst environment by:

- Consulting on environmental management issues to Commonwealth, New South Wales, Tasmanian, Victorian, South Australia, Western Australia and Northern Territory Government instrumentalities;
- Publishing a respected, biennial peer-refereed journal reporting scientific research (Helictite)
- Developing an electronic database of over 10,000 cave and karst features in Australia;
- Cooperating with or lobbying other bodies for better educational and conservation practices e.g. Australian Geological Survey Organisation, Australian Army, Karst & Geodiversity Unit.
- Through its tax-deductible public fund and occasional government grants e.g. from the Natural Heritage Trust, ASF conducts programs and projects to raise community awareness of karst-related environmental issues, especially those of national or regional significance. ASF does not receive any ongoing public funding, and has no paid staff and the members act in a purely voluntary capacity. In addition, by the same means and by persuasion and example it encourages member societies and individuals to undertake practical cave conservation and protection measures in co-operation with owners and managers.

ASF and members played a leading role in environmental issues relating to caves and karst at Colong, Bungonia and Yessabah (NSW), Gordon-Franklin, Precipitous Bluff, Exit Cave and Mt Cripps (Tas) Mount Etna (Qld), The Potholes (Vic) and Sellicks Hill (SA). ASF took court action objecting to mining exploration at Cape Range (WA) and Mt Cripps (Tas) and Timor, NSW. As well, ASF was retained as consultant on specific management strategy issues at Jenolan (NSW), Nullarbor Plain (SA/WA), Yallingup (WA), Hastings Cave and Exit Cave (Tas), Cutta Cutta (NT), and elsewhere.

== Recent environmental issues ==
In the last few years ASF has:

- Formally conducted objections in Mining Warden Courts to mining leases at Cape Range (WA), Mt Cripps (Tas)
- Made submissions to land managers on karst environmental issues at Yanchep National Park (WA), Borenore Caves (NSW), Jenolan Caves (NSW), Hastings Caves (Tas), Mt Field National Park (Tas), Regional Forest Agreement process (Tas), Cooleman (NSW).
- Fenced off remnants of karst vegetation (Cliefden NSW; Canobla, NSW)
- Conducted a rural community workshop on karst on private landholdings (Stuart Town)
- Been an invited participant at an IUCN seminar on limestone quarrying (Bathurst, NSW)
- Contributed to an educational kit published by the Australian Geological Survey Organisation
- Persuaded the Australian Army adventure training school to rewrite its training manual to include a conservation policy supplied by ASF (Hobart and Kapooka)
- Co-sponsored Limestone Coast – First International Workshop on Ramsar Subterranean Wetlands, Naracoorte Caves World Heritage Area 2004
- Initiated dialogue with the aboriginal community, including hosting a training session relating to recognition and conservation of indigenous sites on karst and in caves
- Provided funding for an appeal to the NSW Land and Environment Court relating to a limestone quarry approval near Timor Caves, NSW
- Organised the 14th International Symposium and field trips on Vulcanospeleology for the International Union of Speleology (UIS) Commission on Volcanic Caves, 2010

== Special interest groups ==
=== Cave Diving Group ===
The Australian Speleological Federation Cave Diving Group (ASF-CDG), formed in 2000, is the representative body for ASF cave divers in Australia. It was created to facilitate the exchange of information between cave divers of the various state clubs, which mainly explore and conduct research on Australian caves through cave diving.

== Community and statutory recognition ==
A measure of the high regard and respect held for ASF and organised speleology generally in Australia is the federation's representation on advisory boards and committees throughout the country. ASF had statutory representation on the old Board of Jenolan Caves Reserve Trust (NSW) and its Speleological Advisory Committee, and on the Karst Management Advisory Committee of DECC.

Seven ASF members have received awards in the Order of Australia honours list (OAM and AM), specifically citing their contribution to knowledge and conservation of cave environments. Another was runner-up in the BHP Environmentalist of the Year award, and yet another received a Rolex award for excellence in conservation.

== State/territory clubs ==
The ASF consists of 24 caving clubs or speleological societies across Australia.

Name	Ancronym	State/territory
Canberra Speleological Society Inc.	CSS	ACT
National University Caving Club	NUCC	ACT
Blue Mountains Speleological Club	BMSC	NSW
Central West Speleological Club	CWSS	NSW
Highland Caving Group	HCG	NSW
Hills Speleological Club Ltd.	HSC	NSW
Illawarra Speleological Society Inc.	ISS	NSW
Kempsey Speleological Society	KSS	NSW
Newcastle and Hunter Valley Speleological Society	NHVSS	NSW
Orange Speleogical Society	OSS	NSW
Rover Speleological Society	RSS	NSW
Sydney University Speleologoical Society	SUSS	NSW
Sydney Speleological Society	SSS	NSW
Chillagoe Caving Club	CCC	QLD
Cave Exploration Group South Australia Inc.	CEGSA	SA
Flinders University Speleological Society Inc.	FUSSI	SA
South Australian Speleological Council	SASC	SA
Mole Creek Caving Club	MCCC	TAS
Northern Caverneers	NC	TAS
Southern Tasmanian Caverneers	STC	TAS
Victorian Speleological Association	VSA	VIC
Cave Exploration Group Western Australia Inc.	CEGWA	WA
Cavers Leeuwin Inc.	CLinc	WA
Speleogical Research Group Western Australia Inc.	SRGWA	WA
Western Australian Speleological Group	WASG	WA

== See also ==
- Newcastle and Hunter Valley Speleological Society (NHVSS)
- Sydney Speleological Society (SSS)
- Sydney University Speleological Society (SUSS)
- Victorian Speleological Association (VSA)
- Western Australian Speleological Group (WASG)

== Publications ==
- Australian Speleological Federation (2004), Caves Australia, Australian Speleological Federation, ISSN 1449-2601
- Australian Speleological Federation (1985–2004), Australian Caver, Australian Speleological Federation Inc, ISSN 0817-8240
- Australian Speleological Federation (1957–1985), Newsletter of the Australian Speleological Federation, Australian Speleological Federation, ISSN 0817-8232
