= Shane T. Ahyong =

Australian zoologist specialising in marine invertebrates

Shane Timothy Ahyong is an Australian zoologist specialising in marine invertebrates. Since 2010 he has worked as a senior principal research scientist at the Australian Museum. Following his Ph.D. he worked as a post-doctoral researcher at the Australian Museum and in 2006 left to manage Marine Biodiversity and Biosecurity Group and Marine Invasives Taxonomic Service within the National Institute of Water and Atmospheric Research in New Zealand.

He earned his B.Sc. (Hon) and Ph.D. (in 2000, with the thesis, The phylogeny of the Stomatopoda with a revision of the Australian fauna) from the University of New South Wales.

He is an editor of the World Register of Marine Species, and since 2017 has served as a commissioner for the International Commission on Zoological Nomenclature. He is a past president of The Crustacean Society.

His zoological author abbreviation is Ahyong.

== See also ==
- Taxa named by Shane T. Ahyong
