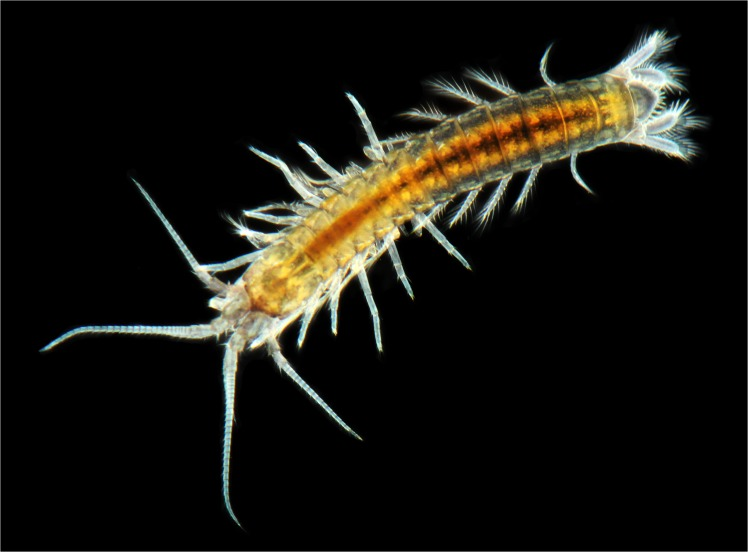
- Koonunga allambiensis

Scientific classification
- Kingdom: Animalia
- Phylum: Arthropoda
- Clade: Pancrustacea
- Class: Malacostraca
- Superorder: Syncarida
- Order: Anaspidacea; Calman, 1904

Families
- See text

= Anaspidacea =

Order of crustaceans

Anaspidacea is an order of crustaceans, comprising eleven genera in four families. Species in the family Anaspidesidae vary from being strict stygobionts (only living underground) to species living in lakes, streams and moorland pools, and are found only in Tasmania. Koonungidae is found in Tasmania and the south-eastern part of the Australian mainland, where they live in the burrows made by crayfish and in caves. The families Psammaspididae and Stygocarididae are both restricted to caves, but Stygocarididae has a much wider distribution than the other families, with Parastygocaris having species in New Zealand and South America as well as Australia; two other genera in the family are endemic to South America, and one, Stygocarella, is endemic to New Zealand.

== Genera ==
- Anaspidesidae Ahyong & Alonso-Zarazaga, 2017 (=Anaspididae Thomson, 1893)
  - Allanaspides Swain, Wilson, Hickman & Ong, 1970 – Tasmania
  - Anaspides Thomson, 1894 – Tasmania
  - Paranaspides Smith, 1908 – Tasmania
- Koonungidae Sayce, 1908
  - Koonunga Sayce, 1907 – south-eastern Australia and Tasmania
  - Micraspides Nicholls, 1931 – south-eastern Australia and Tasmania
- Psammaspididae Schminke, 1974
  - Eucrenonaspides Knott & Lake, 1980 – Tasmania
  - Psammaspides Schminke, 1974 – south-eastern Australia
- Stygocarididae Noodt, 1963
  - Oncostygocaris Schminke, 1980 – southern South America
  - Parastygocaris Noodt, 1963 – southern South America
  - Stygocarella Schminke, 1980 – New Zealand
  - Stygocaris Noodt, 1963 – southern South America, south-eastern Australia and New Zealand
