= List of arthropod orders =

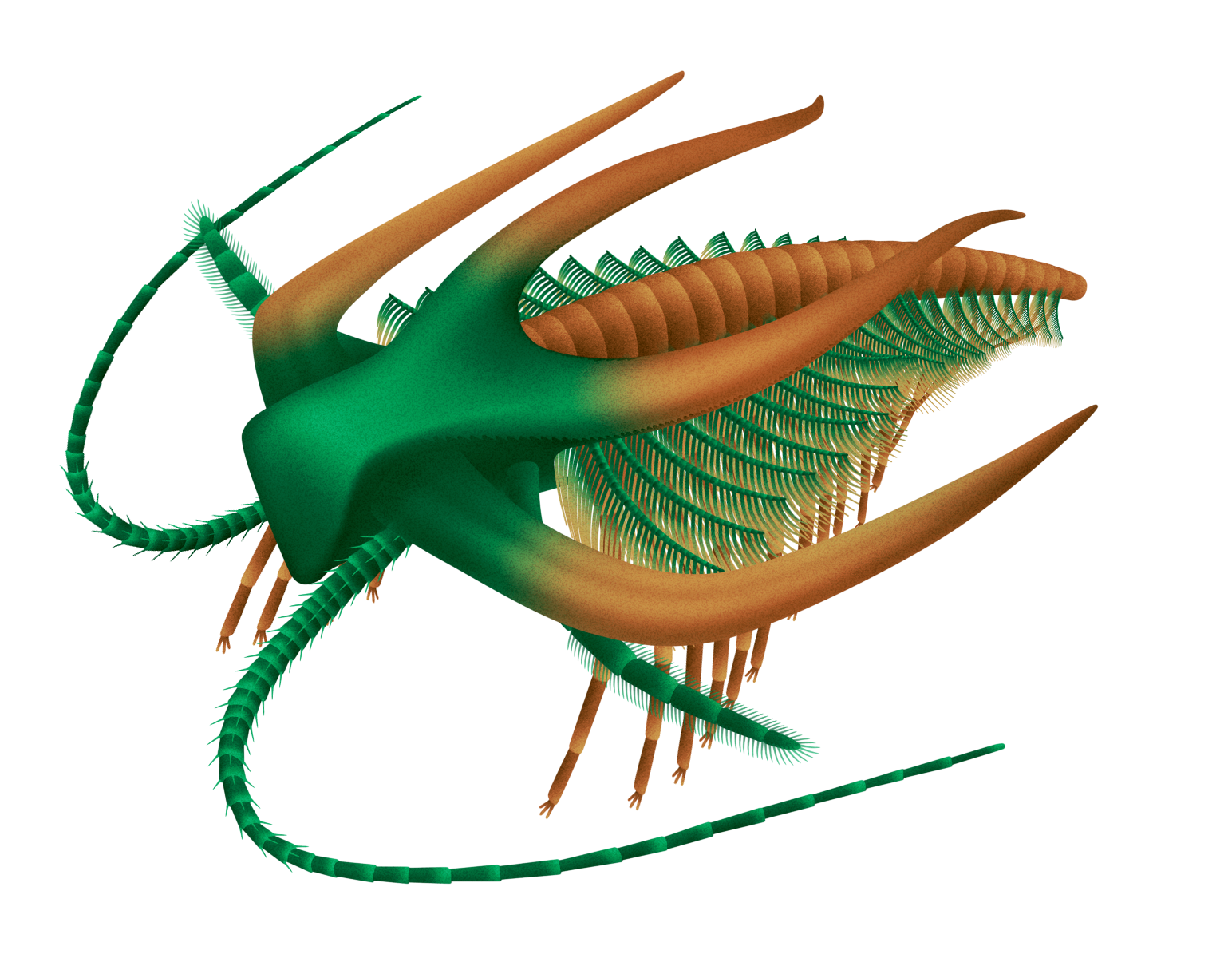
Marrella, one of the puzzling arthropods from the Burgess Shale

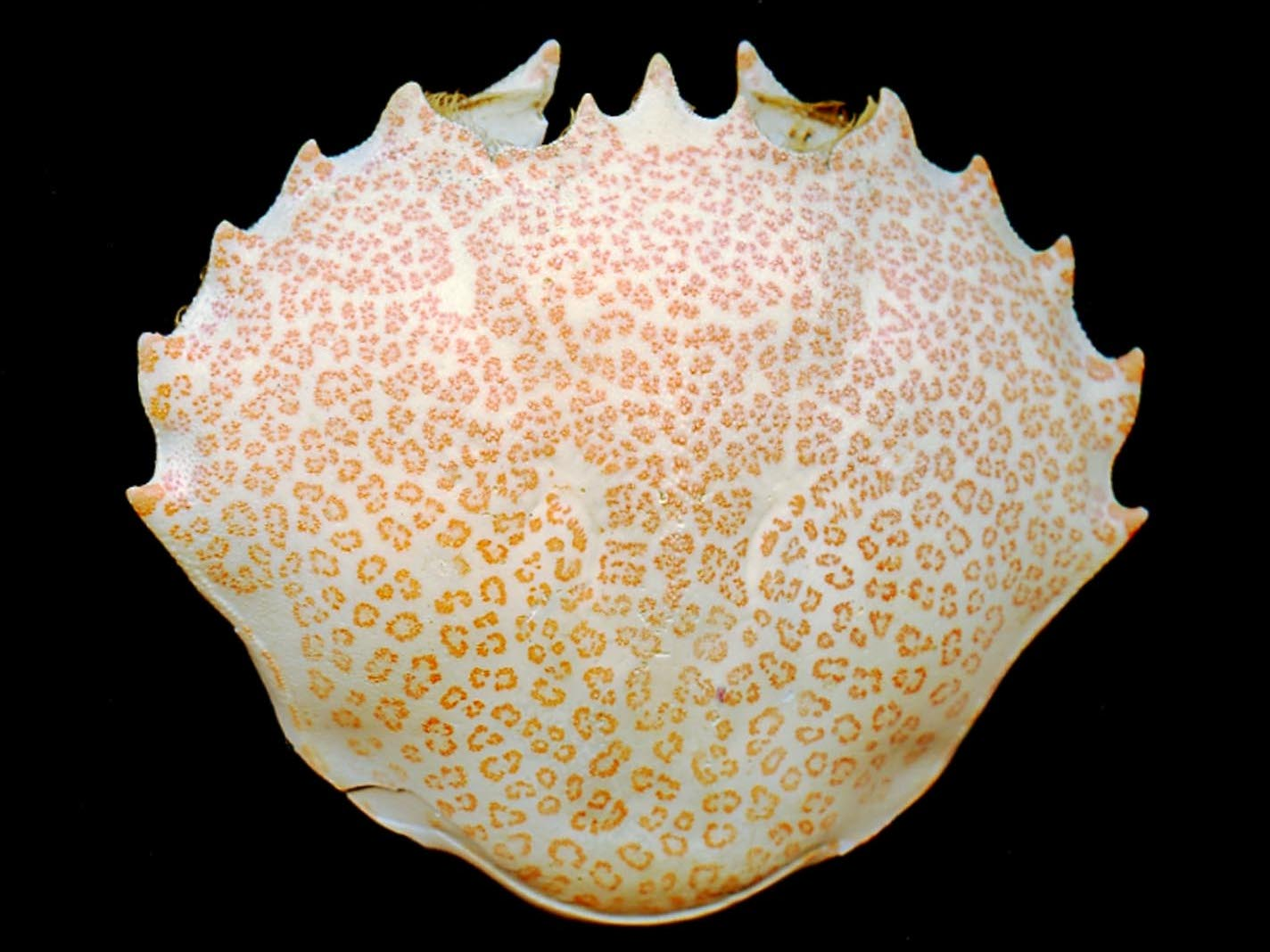
A shed carapace of a lady crab, part of the hard exoskeleton

Arthropods are invertebrate animals having an exoskeleton, a segmented body, and paired jointed appendages. Arthropods form the phylum Arthropoda. They are distinguished by their jointed limbs and cuticle made of chitin, often mineralised with calcium carbonate. The arthropod body plan consists of segments, each with a pair of appendages. Arthropods are bilaterally symmetrical and their body possesses an external skeleton. In order to keep growing, they must go through stages of moulting, a process by which they shed their exoskeleton to reveal a new one. Some species have wings. They are an extremely diverse group, with up to 10 million species.

Arthropods are invertebrate animals with a chitinous exoskeleton, segmented bodies, and jointed legs. The phylum Arthropoda contains numerous taxonomic orders in over 20 classes.

== Subphylum Hexapoda ==
- Order Diplura (Diplurans)
- Order Protura (Coneheads)

=== Class Insecta (Insects) ===
Head of a wasp with three ocelli (centre), and compound eyes at the left and right

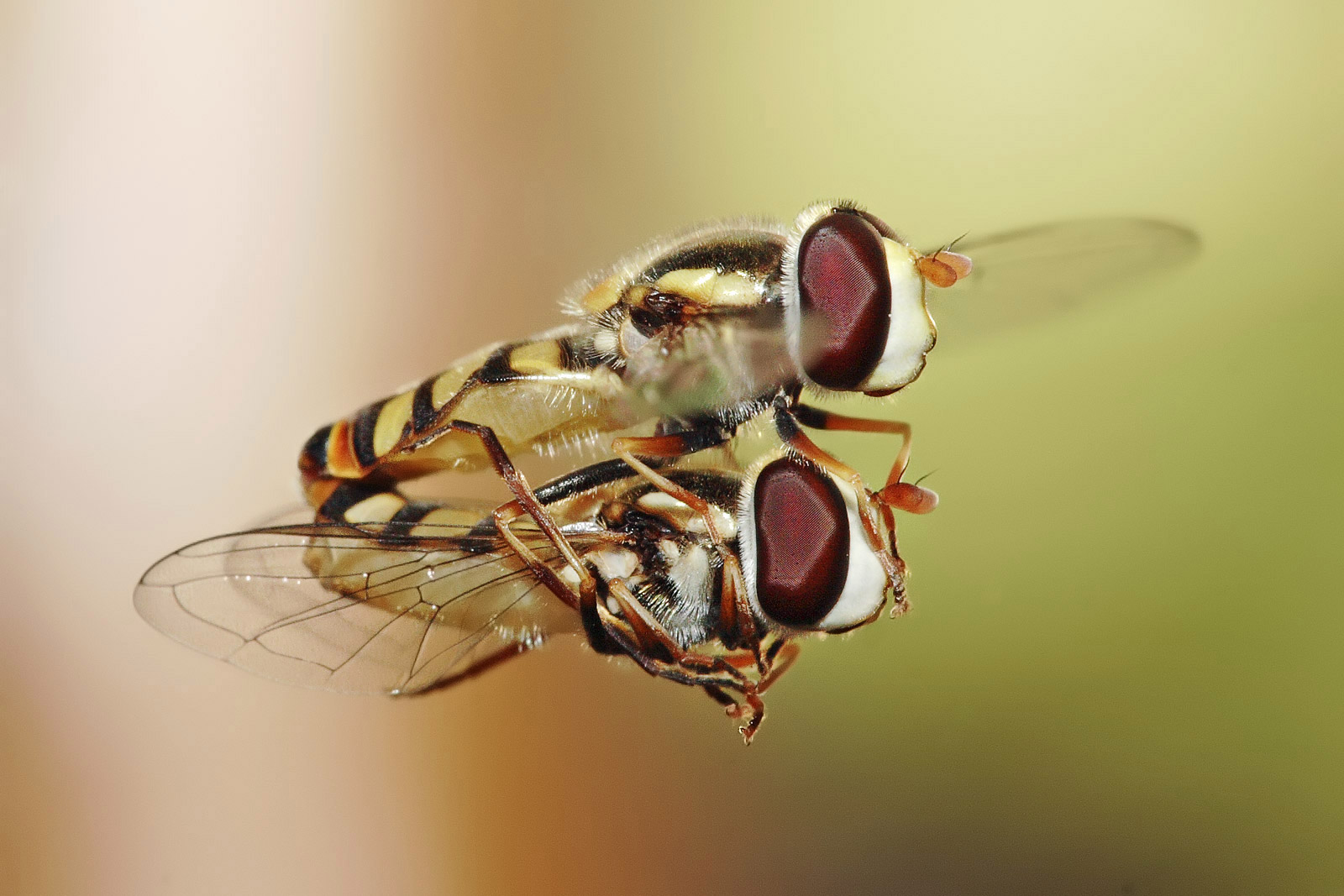
A pair of Simosyrphus grandicornis hoverflies mating in flight.

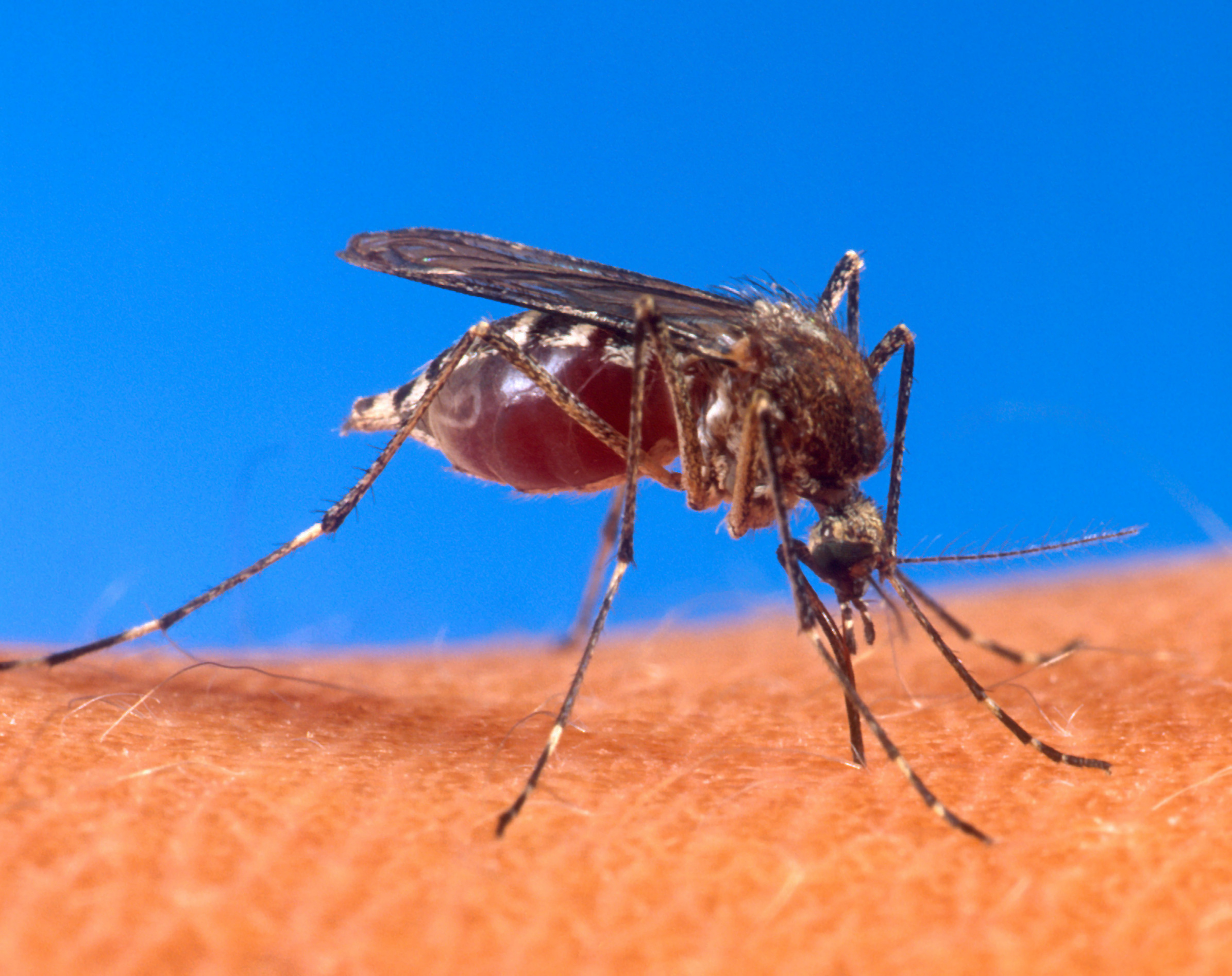
Aedes aegypti, a parasite, is the vector of dengue fever and yellow fever

==== Subclass Monocondylia or Monochlamydia ====
- Order Archaeognatha – 550 (Jumping bristletails)

==== Subclass Dicondylia ====
- Order †Carbotriplurida
- Infraclass Thysanura
  - Order Zygentoma – 370
- Subclass Pterygota
  - Order †Perielytrodea
  - Order Panephemeroptera
    - Order †Protephemeroptera
    - Order †Syntonopterodea
    - Order †Permoplectoptera
    - Order †Coxoplectoptera
    - Order Ephemeroptera – 3,000 (Mayflies)
  - Clade Odonataptera
    - Order †Eugeroptera
    - Order †Kukaloptera
    - Order †Argentinoptera
    - Order †Geroptera
    - Order †Eomeganisoptera
    - Order †Meganisoptera
    - Order †Campylopterodea
    - Order †Protanisoptera
    - Order †Triadophlebioptera
    - Order †Protozygoptera
    - Order Odonata – 5,900 (Dragonflies and damselflies)
  - Clade †Palaeodictyopteroidea
    - Order †Palaeodictyoptera
    - Order †Permothemistida
    - Order †Diaphanopterodea
    - Order †Megasecoptera
  - Clade Polyneoptera
    - Order †Eoblattida
    - Order †Reculida
    - Order †Paoliida
    - Order †Protorthoptera (Paraphyletic assemblage of basal and stem polyneopterans)
    - Order †Sheimiodea
    - Order Zoraptera – 28 (Angel insects)
    - Order †Archelytroidea
    - Order †Protelytroptera
    - Order Dermaptera – 1,816 (Earwigs)
    - Order Plecoptera – 2,274 (Stoneflies)
    - Order †Caloblattinidea
    - Order †Alienoptera
    - Order Mantodea – 2,200 (Mantises)
    - Order Blattodea – 7,400 (Cockroaches and termites)
    - Order Grylloblattodea – 34 (ice-crawlers)
    - Order Mantophasmatodea – 15 (gladiators)
    - Order Phasmatodea – 2,500–3,300 (Stick insects or stick-bugs)
    - Order Embioptera – 200–300 (Webspinners)
    - Order †Chresmododea
    - Order †Cnemidolestida
    - Order †Titanoptera
    - Order †Caloneurodea
    - Order Orthoptera – 24,380 (Grasshoppers, locusts, crickets, etc.)
  - Clade Clareocercaria
    - Order †Hypoperlida
    - Order †Miomoptera
    - Order Psocodea – 11,000 (Lice, bark lice, book lice)
    - Order †Permopsocida
    - Order Hemiptera – 50,000–80,000 (True bugs)
    - Order †Lophioneurida
    - Order Thysanoptera – 7,700 (Thrips)
  - Clade Holometabola
    - Order Hymenoptera – 115,000 (Sawflies, wasps, bees, and ants)
    - Order Strepsiptera – 596 (Twisted-wing parasites)
    - Order Coleoptera – 360,000–400,000 (Beetles)
    - Order †Glosselytrodea
    - Order Raphidioptera – 210 (Snakeflies)
    - Order Megaloptera – 250–300 (Alderflies, dobsonflies, and fishflies)
    - Order Neuroptera – 5,000 (Net-winged insects)
    - Order †Protomecoptera
    - Order †Tarachoptera
    - Order †Permotrichoptera
    - Order Lepidoptera – 174,250 (Butterflies and moths)
    - Order Trichoptera – 12,627 (Caddisfly)
    - Order †Paratrichoptera
    - Order †Protodiptera (Permotipula and Permila)
    - Order Diptera – 152,956 (Flies)
    - Order †Paramecoptera
    - Order Nannomecoptera
    - Order Mecoptera – 481 (Scorpionflies)
    - Order Neomecoptera
    - Order Siphonaptera – 2,525 (Fleas)

=== Class Collembola ===
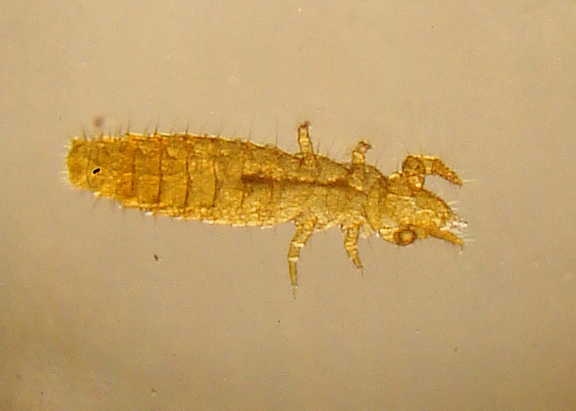
Proturan specimen (Acerentomon sp.)

- Order Entomobryomorpha
- Order Poduromorpha
- Order Symphypleona
- Order Neelipleona

== Subphylum Chelicerata ==
=== Class Xiphosura ===
- Order Xiphosurida

=== Class †Eurypterida ===
- Order †Eurypterida
- Order †Chasmataspidida

=== Class Arachnida (Arachnids) ===
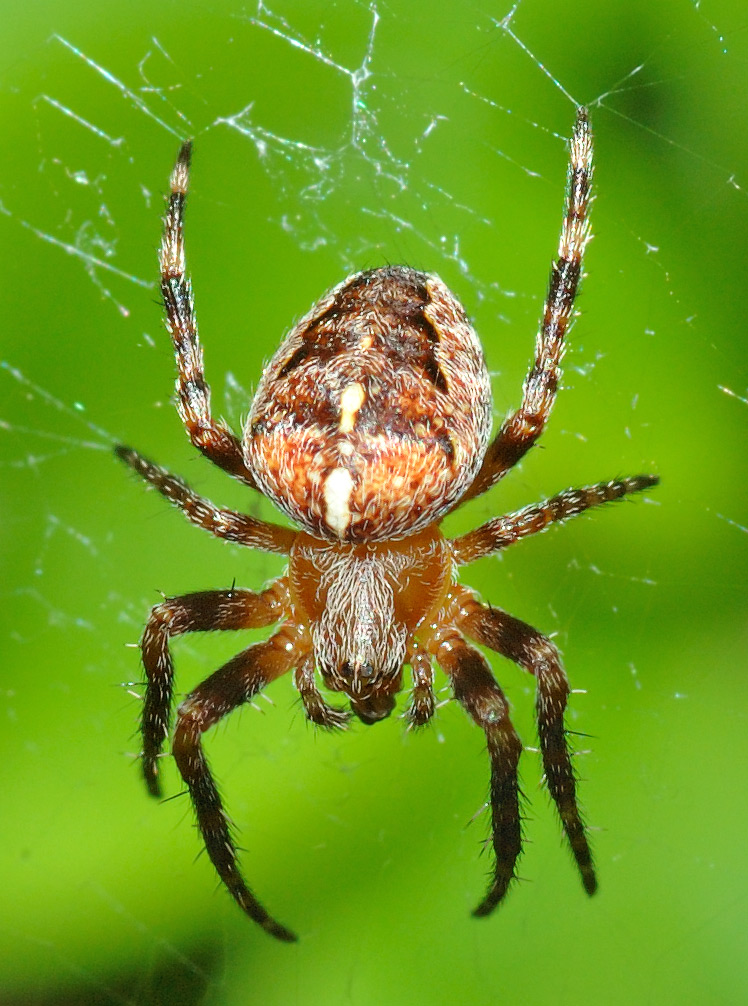
Araneus diadematus spider

- Subclass Acari (Mites)
  - Order Opilioacariformes
  - Order Ixodida (Ticks)
  - Order Holothyrida
  - Order Mesostigmata
  - Order Trombidiformes
  - Order Sarcoptiformes
  - Order Endeostigmata
- Subclass Arachnopulmonata
  - Order Amblypygi (Whip spiders)
  - Order Araneae (Spiders)
  - Order †Haptopoda
  - Order Palpigradi (Microwhip scorpions)
  - Order †Uraraneida
  - Order Schizomida (Short-tailed whip scorpions)
  - Order Pseudoscorpionida (Pseudoscorpions, or false scorpions)
  - Order Scorpiones (True scorpions)
  - Order Uropygi (Thelyphonida s.s., whip scorpions)
  - Order †Trigonotarbida
- Order Opiliones (Harvestmen, also known as daddy longlegs)
- Order †Phalangiotarbida
- Order Solifugae (Sun spiders or wind scorpions)
- Order Ricinulei (Hooded tickspiders)

=== Class Pycnogonida ===
- Order Pantopoda (Sea spiders)

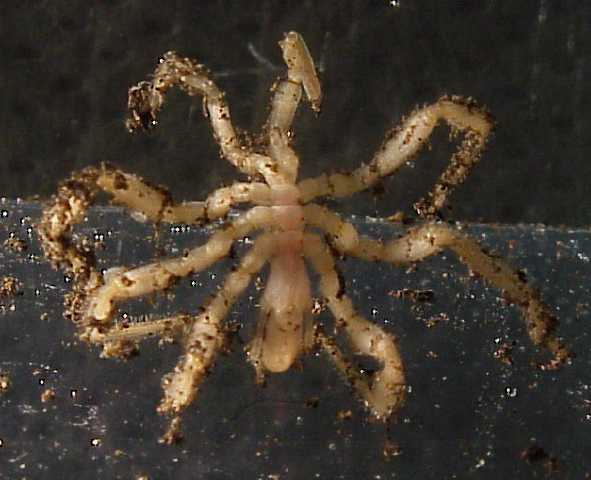
Pycnogonida

== Subphylum Myriapoda (Centipedes and millipedes) ==
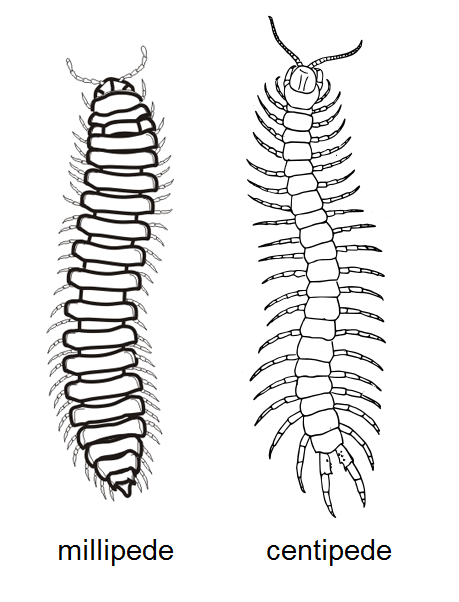
A representative millipede and centipede (not necessarily to scale)

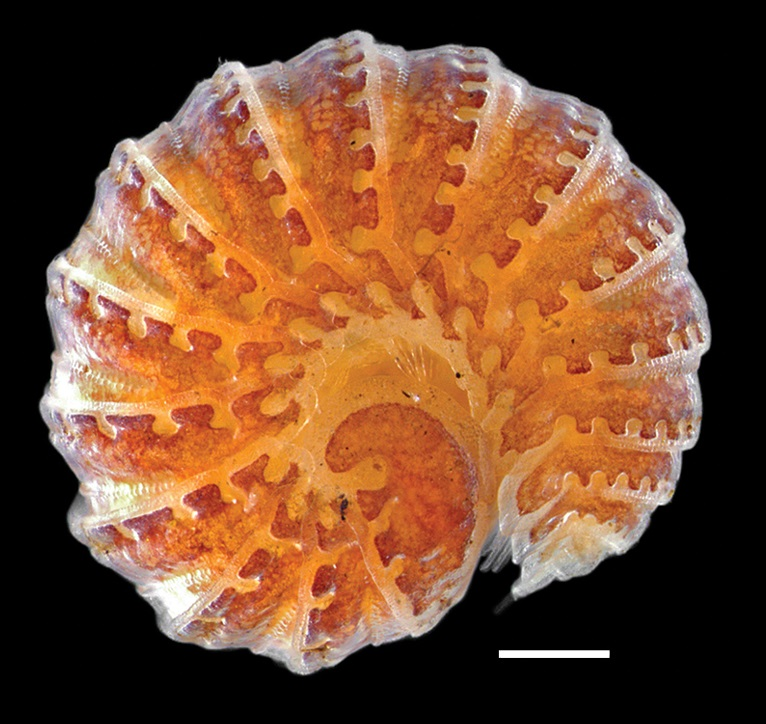
Ammodesmus nimba from Guinea, West Africa, curled in a defensive coil

=== Class Chilopoda (Centipedes) ===
- Order Scutigeromorpha
- Order Lithobiomorpha (stone centipedes)
- Order †Devonobiomorpha
- Order Craterostigmomorpha
- Order Scolopendromorpha (tropical centipedes)
- Order Geophilomorpha (soil centipedes)

=== Class Diplopoda (Millipedes) ===
==== Subclass Penicillata ====
- Order Polyxenida (Bristly millipedes)

==== Subclass Chilognatha ====
- Order †Zosterogrammida
- Infraclass †Arthropleuridea
  - Order †Arthropleurida
  - Order †Eoarthropleurida
  - Order †Microdecemplicida
- Infraclass Pentazonia
  - Order †Amynilyspedida
  - Superorder Limacomorpha
    - Order Glomeridesmida
  - Superorder Oniscomorpha (Pill millipedes)
    - Order Glomerida
    - Order Sphaerotheriida (Giant pill millipedes)
- Infraclass †Archipolypoda
  - Order †Archidesmida
  - Order †Cowiedesmida
  - Order †Euphoberiida
  - Order †Palaeosomatida
- Infraclass Helminthomorpha
  - Order †Pleurojulida
  - Order Platydesmida
  - Order Polyzoniida
  - Order Siphonocryptida
  - Order Siphonophorida
  - Superorder Juliformia
    - Order Julida
    - Order Siphoniulida
    - Order Spirobolida
    - Order Spirostreptida
    - Superfamily †Xyloiuloidea (Sometimes aligned with Spirobolida)
  - Superorder Merocheta
    - Order Polydesmida (Flat-backed millipedes)
  - Superorder Nematophora
    - Order Callipodida
    - Order Chordeumatida
    - Order Stemmiulida

=== Class Pauropoda ===
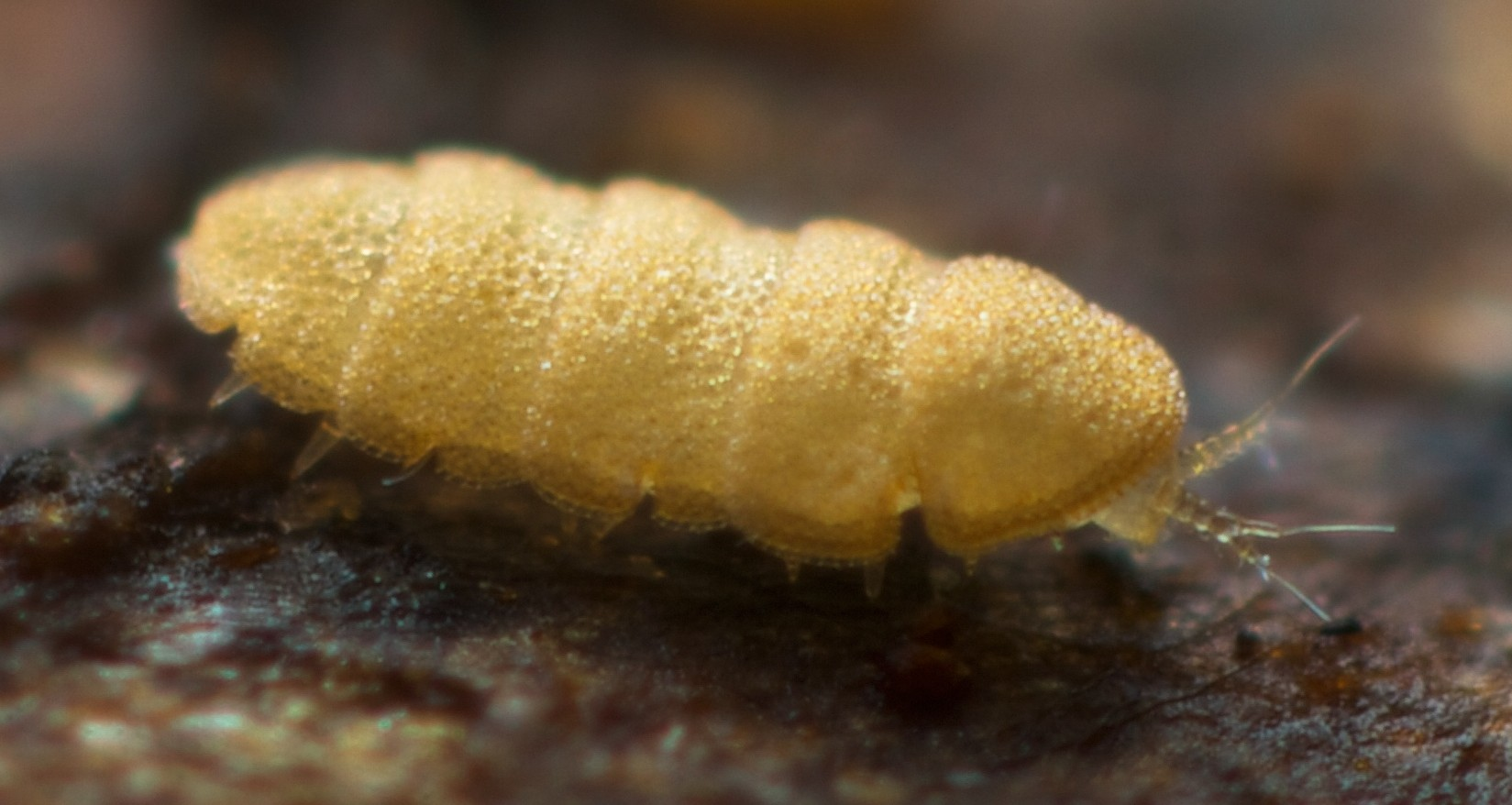
A pauropod

- Order Hexamerocerata
- Order Tetramerocerata

=== Class Symphyla ===
- Order Scolopendrellida (garden centipedes)
- Order Scutigerellida

== Subphylum Crustacea (Crustaceans) ==
- Order †Henningsmoenicarida
- Order †Cambropachycopida
- Order †Cambrocarida
- Order †Martinssoniida
- Order †Phosphatocopida
- Order †Bostrichopodida

=== Class †Thylacocephala ===
- Order †Ainiktozoiformes
- Order †Concavicarida
- Order †Conchyliocarida

=== Class Remipedia ===
- Order †Enantiopoda
- Order Nectiopoda

=== Class Branchiopoda ===
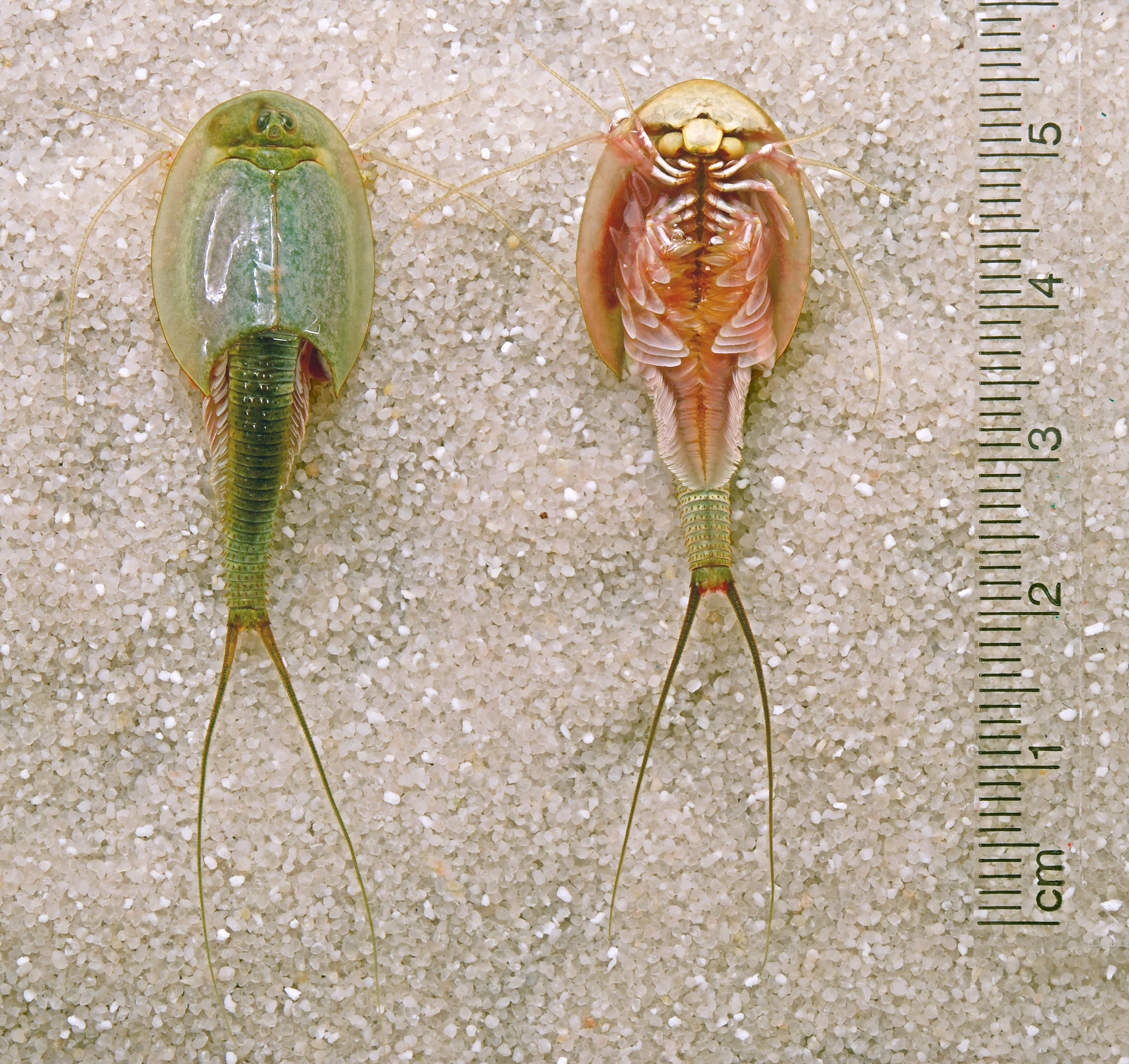
Branchiopods

- Subclass Sarsostraca
  - Order Anostraca (Fairy shrimp)
  - Order †Lipostraca
- Subclass Phyllopoda
  - Infraclass Calmanostraca
    - Order †Protocaridida
    - Order †Kazacharthra
    - Order Notostraca (Tadpole shrimp)
  - Infraclass Diplostraca (Clam shrimp)
    - Order Laevicaudata
    - Order Spinicaudata
    - Order Cyclestherida
    - Order Anomopoda
    - Order Ctenopoda
    - Order Haplopoda
    - Order Onychopoda

=== Class Cephalocarida ===
- Order Brachypoda (Horseshoe shrimp)

=== Class Thecostraca ===
==== Subclass Ascothoracida ====
- Order Dendrogastrida
- Order Laurida

==== Subclass Cirripedia (Barnacles) ====
- Infraclass Acrothoracica
  - Order Cryptophialida
  - Order Lithoglyptida
- Infraclass Rhizocephala
- Infraclass Thoracica
  - Superorder Phosphatothoracica
    - Order Iblomorpha
    - Order †Eolepadomorpha
  - Superorder Thoracicalcarea
    - Order Calanticomorpha
    - Order Pollicipedomorpha
    - Order Scalpellomorpha
    - Order †Archaeolepadomorpha
    - Order †Brachylepadomorpha
    - (unranked) Sessilia (Acorn barnacles)
      - Order Balanomorpha
      - Order Verrucomorpha

=== Class Hexanauplia ===
==== Subclass Copepoda (Copepods) ====
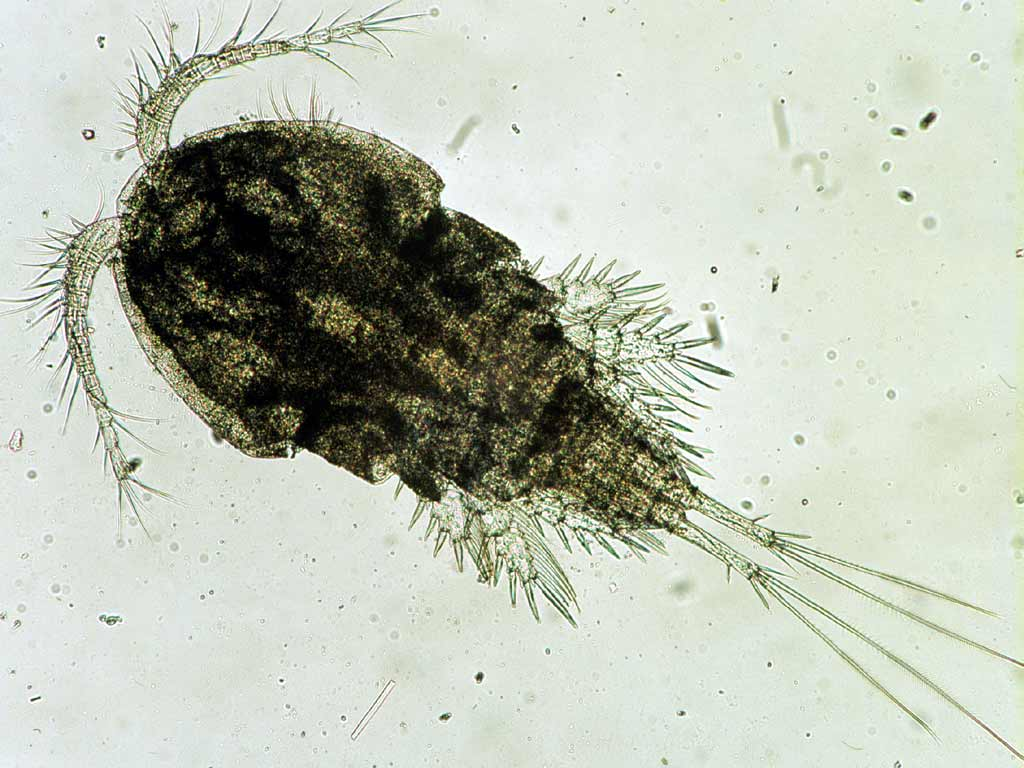
Cyclops (Copepoda: Cyclopoida)

- Infraclass Progymnoplea
  - Order Platycopioida
- Infraclass Neocopepoda
  - Clade Gymnoplea
    - Order Calanoida
  - Clade Podoplea
    - Order Canuelloida
    - Order Cyclopoida (incl. Poecilostomatoida)
    - Order Gelyelloida
    - Order Harpacticoida
    - Order Misophrioida
    - Order Monstrilloida
    - Order Mormonilloida
    - Order Siphonostomatoida

=== Class Ichthyostraca ===
==== Subclass Branchiura ====
- Order Arguloida (Carp lice, or fish lice)
- Order †Cyclida (Cycloids)

==== Subclass Pentastomida ====
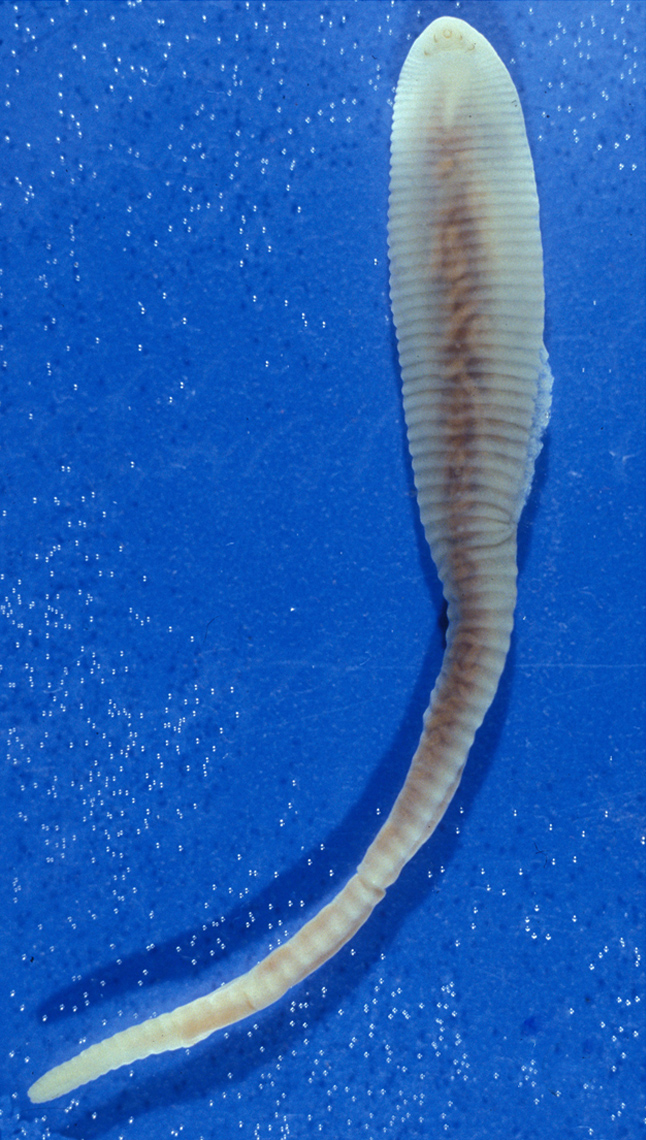
Adult female Linguatula serrata

- Order Cephalobaenida
- Order Porocephalida
- Order Raillietiellida
- Order Reighardiida

=== Class Mystacocarida ===
- Order Mystacocaridida

=== Class Ostracoda (Ostracods, or seed shrimp) ===
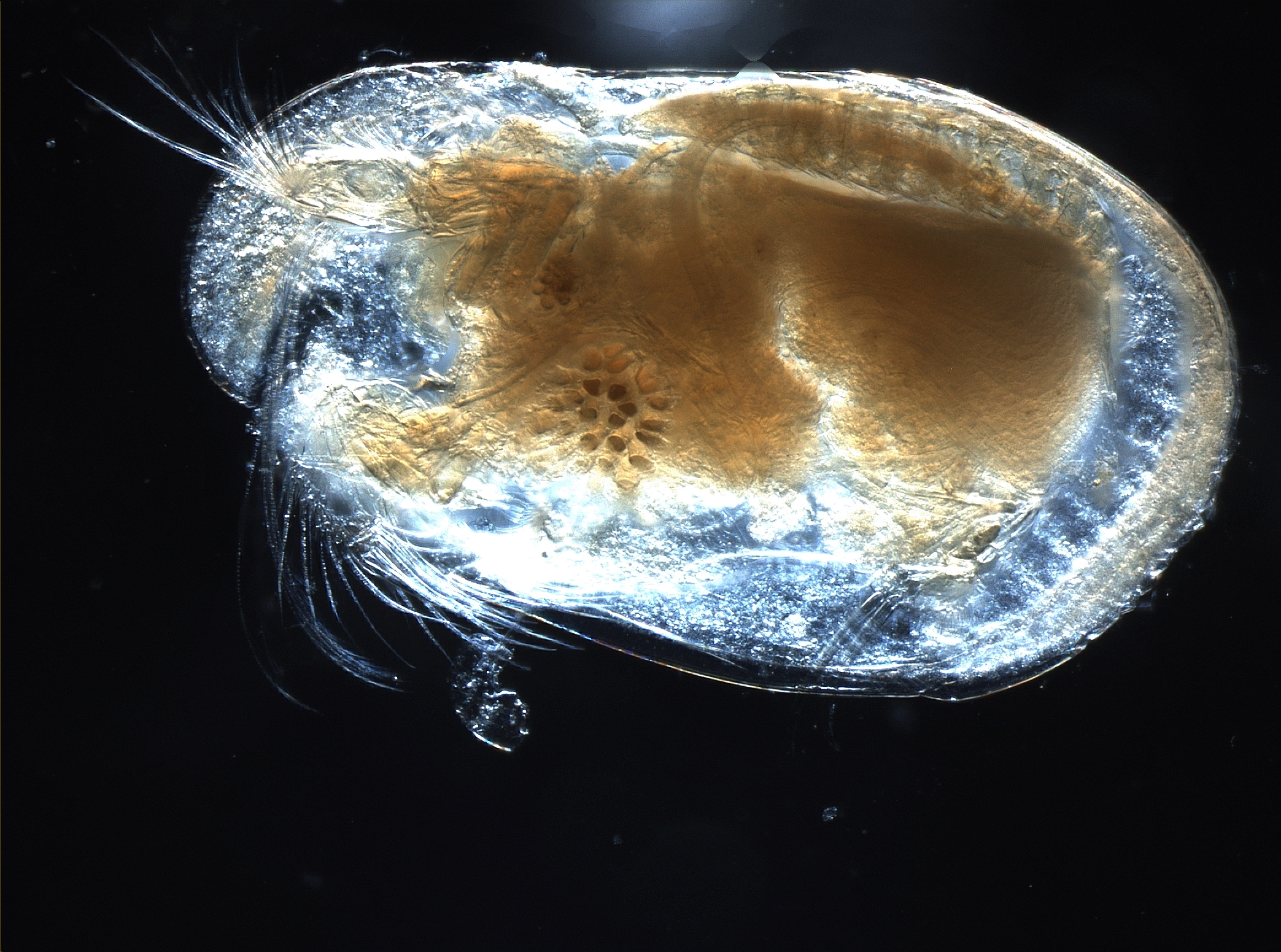
Ostracod

- Order †Eridostracoda

==== Subclass †Leperditicopa ====
- Order †Leperditicopida

==== Subclass †Leiocopa ====
- Order †Leiocopida

==== Subclass Palaeocopa ====
- Order Palaeocopida

==== Subclass Myodocopa ====
- Order Myodocopida
- Order Halocyprida

==== Subclass Podocopa ====
- Order Platycopida
- Order Podocopida

=== Class Malacostraca (Malcostracans, such as crabs and lobsters) ===
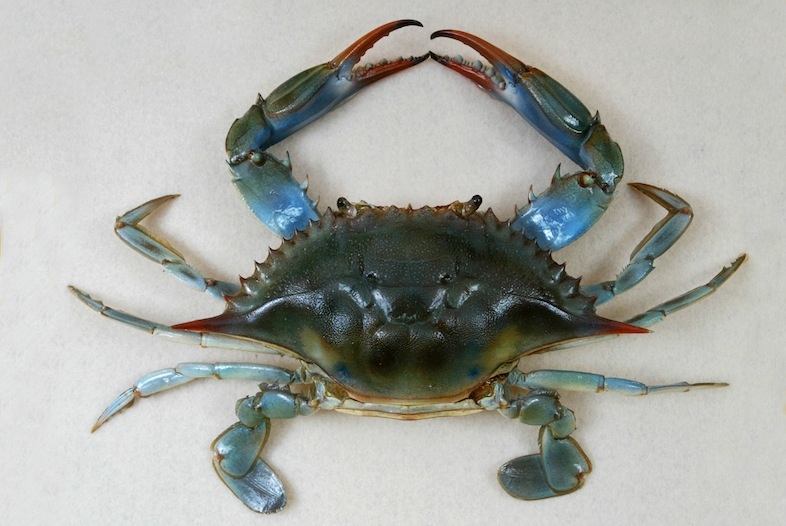
Syncarid Atlantic blue crab Callinectes sapidus

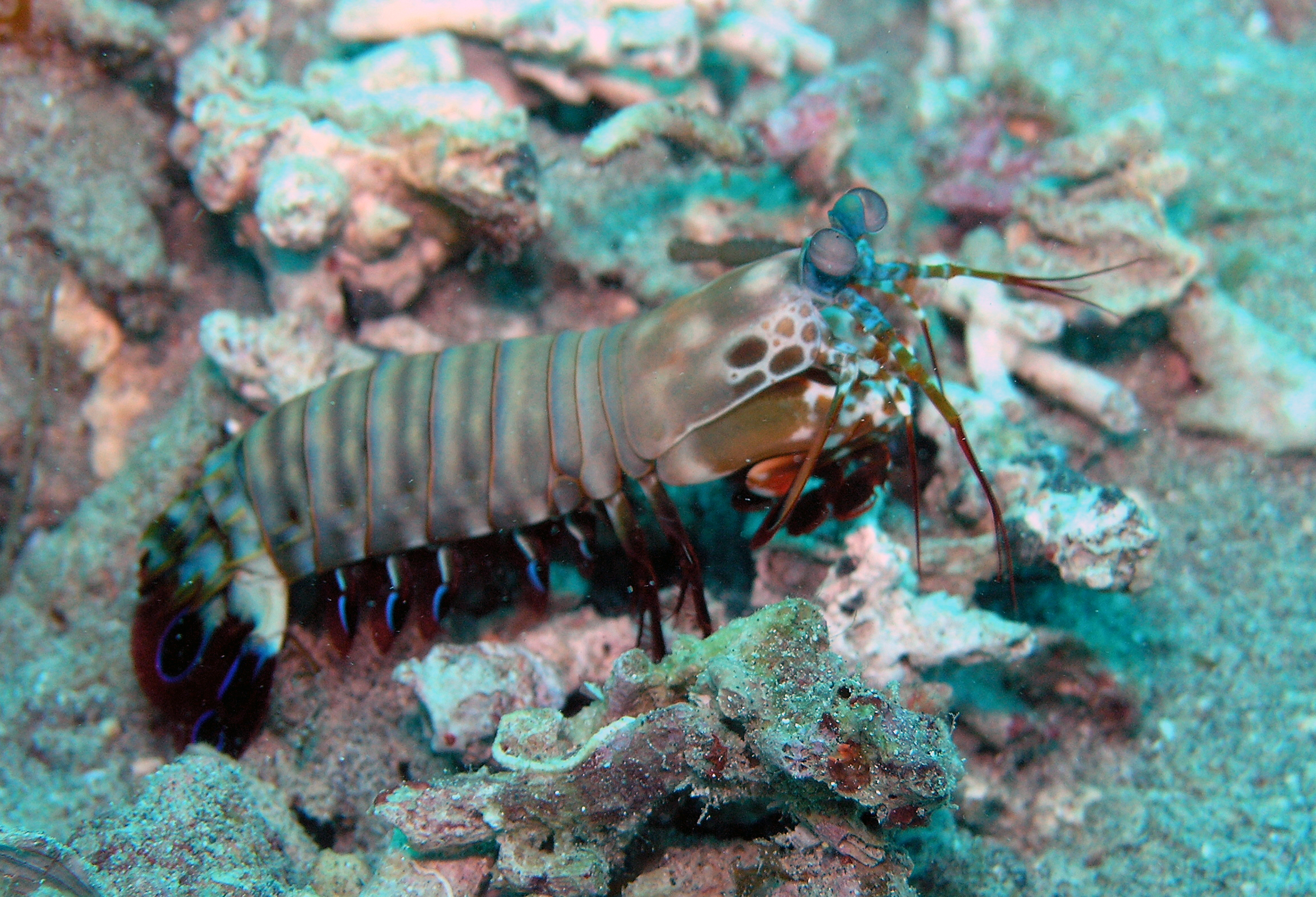
Hoplocarid

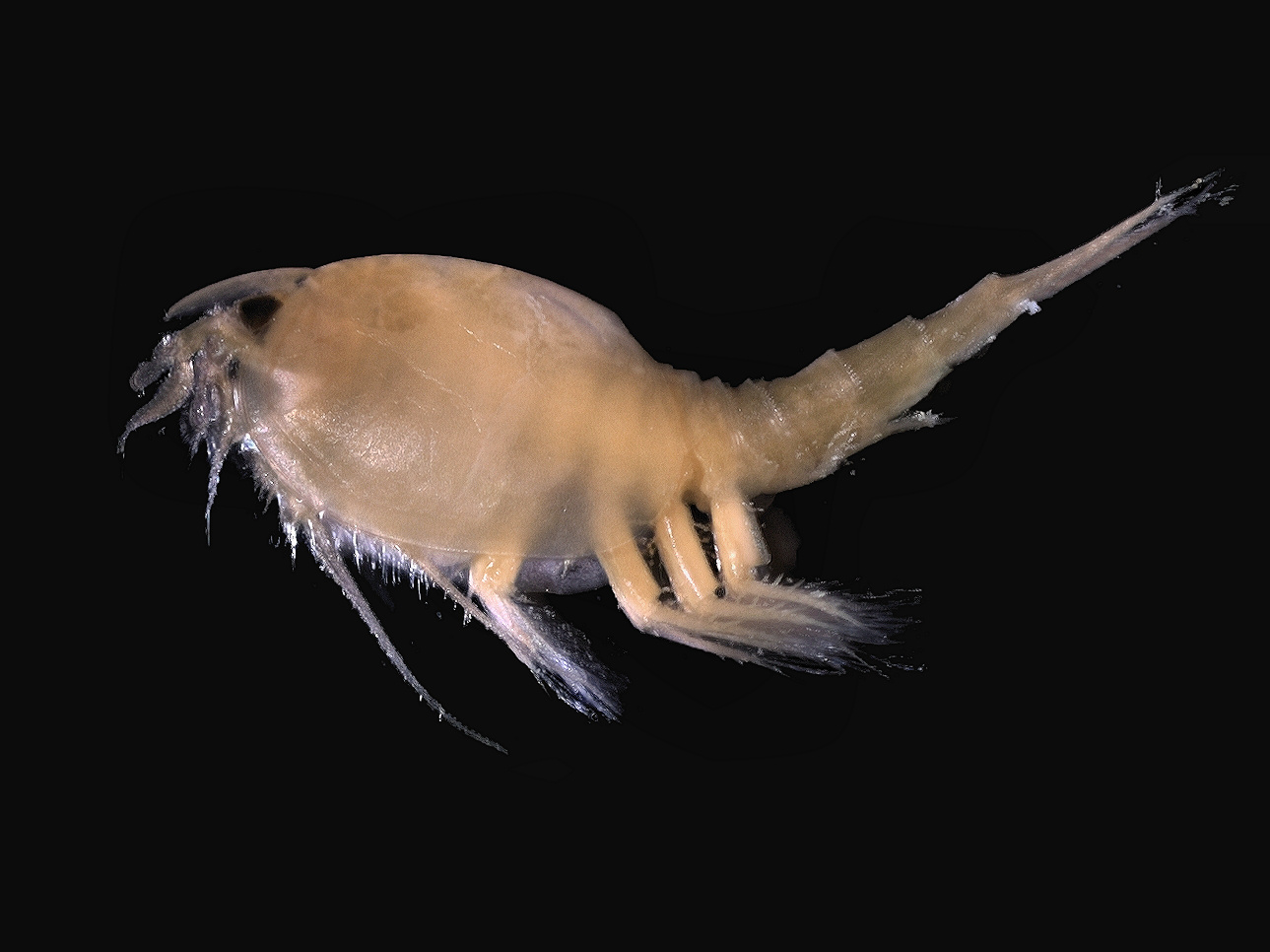
Nebalia bipes Phyllocarid

==== Subclass Eumalacostraca ====
- Superorder Syncarida
  - Order Anaspidacea Calman, 1904
  - Order Bathynellacea Chappuis, 1915
  - Order †Palaeocaridacea
- Superorder †Eocarida
  - Order †Eocaridacea
  - Order †Pygocephalomorpha
- Superorder Peracarida
  - Order Amphipoda (Includes freshwater shrimp and sandhoppers)
  - Order Cumacea (Hooded shrimp)
  - Order Isopoda (Isopods - includes wood lice)
  - Order Lophogastrida
  - Order Mictacea
  - Order Mysida
  - Order Spelaeogriphacea
  - Order Stygiomysida
  - Order Tanaidacea (Tanaids)
  - Order Thermosbaenacea
- Superorder Eucarida
  - Order Decapoda (Crayfish, crabs, lobsters, prawns, and shrimp)
  - Order Euphausiacea (Krill)
  - Order †Angustidontida

==== Subclass Hoplocarida ====
- Order Stomatopoda (Mantis shrimp)
- Order †Aeschronectida
- Order †Palaeostomatopoda

==== Subclass Phyllocarida ====
- Order †Archaeostraca
- Order †Hoplostraca
- Order Leptostraca

== Subphylum †Artiopoda ==
=== no class ===
- Order †Emeraldellida
- Order †Cheloniellida
- Order †Sidneyiformes
- Order †Agnostina

=== Class †Protosutura ===
- Order †Acanthomeridiida

=== Class †Aglaspida ===
- Order †Aglaspidida
- Order †Strabopida

=== Class †Trilobita ===
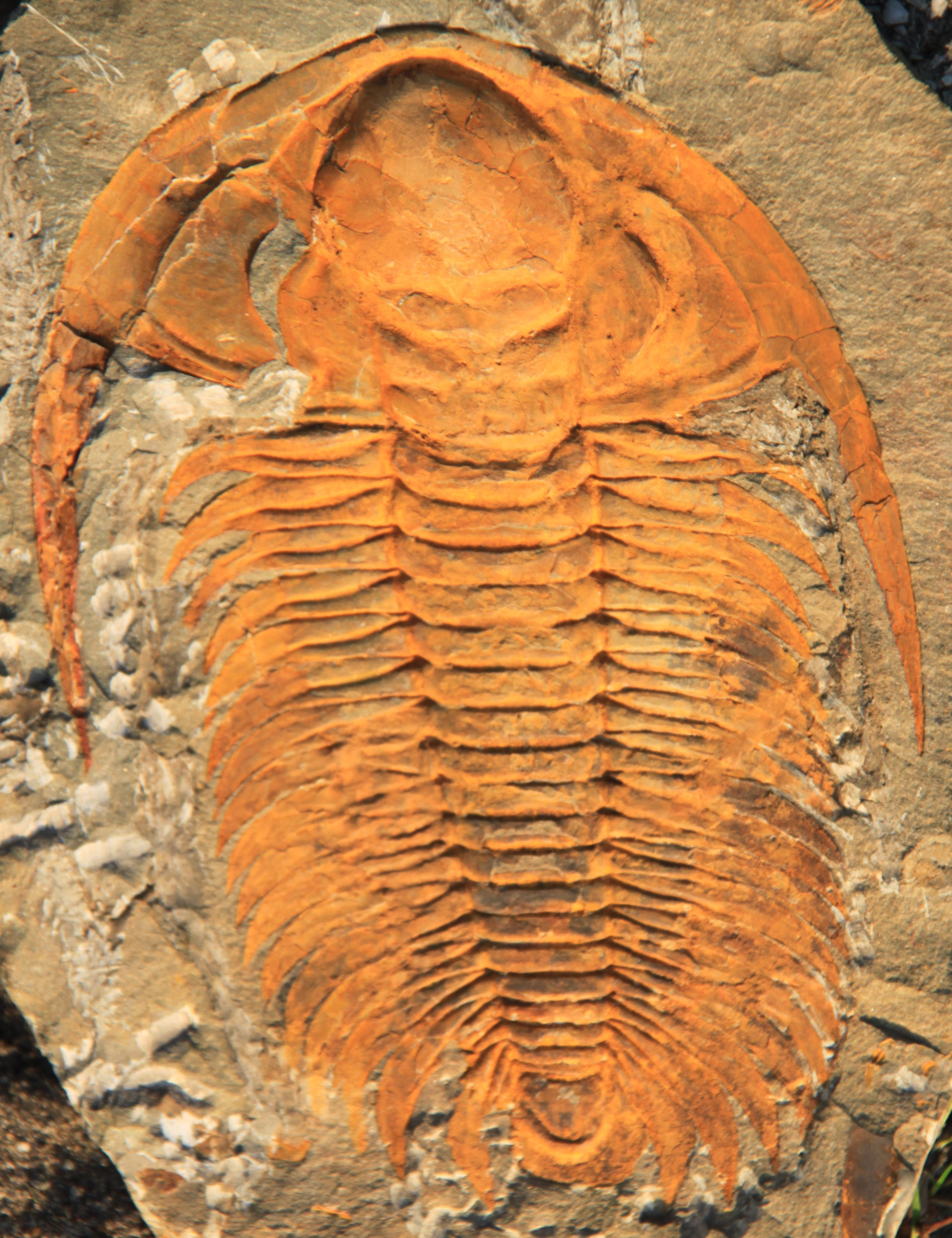
Paradoxides

==== Subclass †Petalopleura ====
- Order †Sinoburiida
- Order †Xandarellida

==== Subclass †Nectopleura ====
- Order †Nectaspidida

==== Subclass †Conciliterga ====
- Order †Helmetiida †

==== Subclass †Trilobita ====
- Order †Eodiscina
- Order †Olenellina
- Order †Asaphida
- Order †Aulacopleurida
- Order †Corynexochida
- Order †Harpetida
- Order †Redlichiida
- Order †Lichida
- Order †Phacopida
- Order †Proetida
- Order †Ptychopariida

== Other classes ==
=== no class ===
- Order †Isoxyida
- Order †Hymenocarina
- Order †Mollisoniida
- Order †Bradoriida
- Order †Burgessiida
- Order †Fuxianhuiida
- Order †Habeliida

=== Class †Megacheira ===
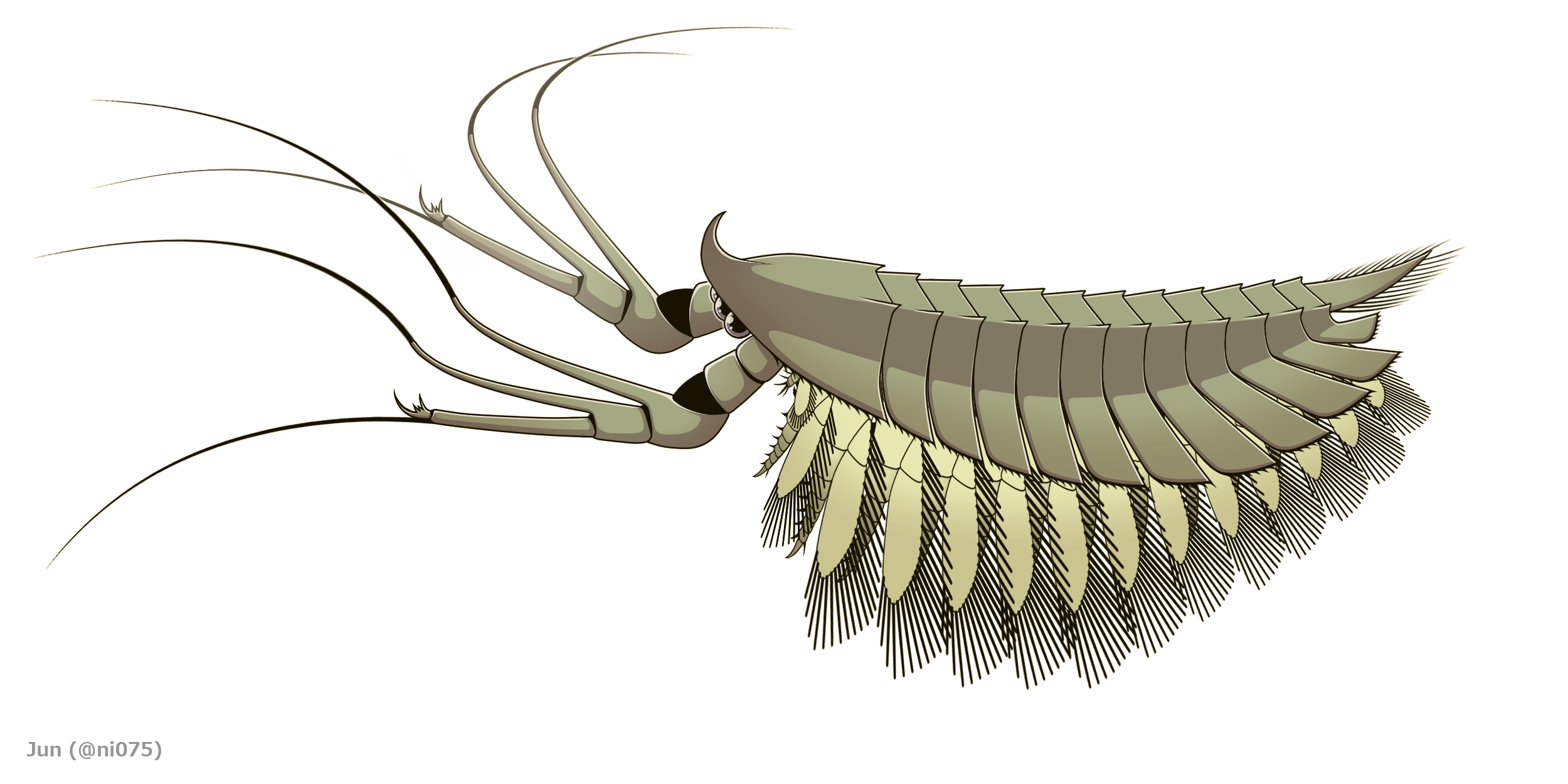
Reconstructed Leanchoilia

- Order †Leanchoiliida
- Order †Yohoiida

=== Class †Marrellomorpha ===
- Order †Acercostraca
- Order †Marrellida

=== Class †Dinocaridida ===
- Order †Radiodonta
- Order †Opabiniida

=== Class †Euthycarcinoidea ===
- Order †Euthycarcinida
