= Scutigerella hauserae =

Scientific classification
- Kingdom: Animalia
- Phylum: Arthropoda
- Subphylum: Myriapoda
- Class: Symphyla
- Family: Scutigerellidae
- Genus: Scutigerella
- Species: S. hauserae

Binomial name
- Scutigerella hauserae Scheller, 1990

Species of cave-dwelling symphylan

Scutigerella hauserae is a species of symphylan myriapod found in Slovenia. (Note: The type locality is given as Yugoslavia: Postojnska jama. Postojnska jama is the Slovene word for Postojna Cave, a karst system in southwestern Slovenia. The type locality is therefore in present-day Slovenia.) It was described by Ulf Scheller, a Swedish entemologist, in 1990. It is known from Postojnska Jama, a cave system in Slovenia. It has several physical adaptations which may make it more suited for trogloniontic (cave) life.
