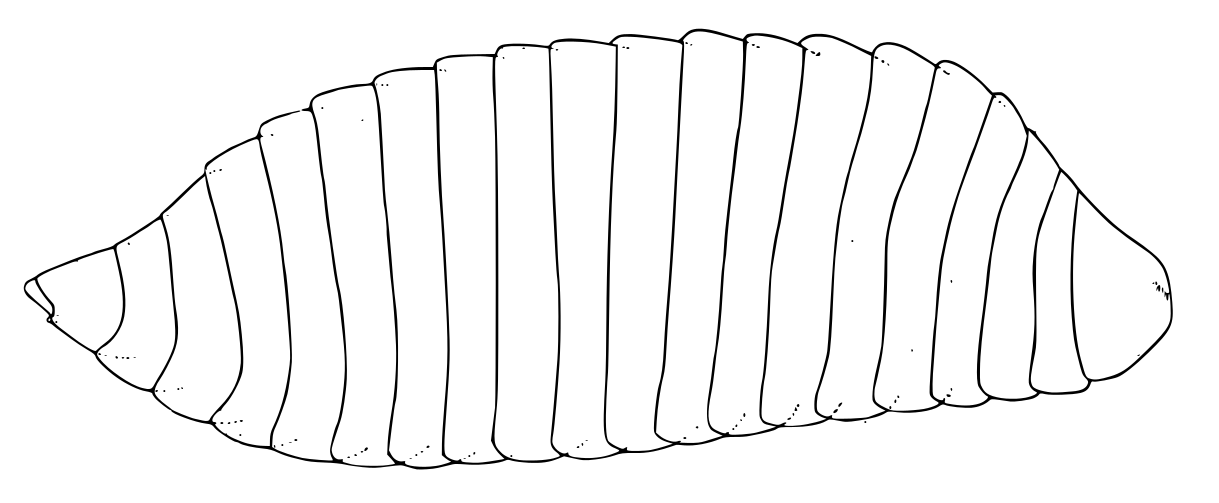

Scientific classification
- Kingdom: Animalia
- Phylum: Arthropoda
- Subphylum: Myriapoda
- Class: Diplopoda
- Order: Glomeridesmida
- Family: Termitodesmidae
- Genus: Termitodesmus
- Species: T. ceylonicus

Binomial name
- Termitodesmus ceylonicus Silvestri, 1911

= Termitodesmus ceylonicus =

Species of millipede

Termitodesmus ceylonicus is a species of millipede in the family Glomeridesmidae. It is endemic to Sri Lanka.
