= Permotanyderus =

Permotanyderus Temporal range: Upper Permian

Scientific classification
- Domain: Eukaryota
- Kingdom: Animalia
- Phylum: Arthropoda
- Class: Insecta
- Order: Mecoptera
- Family: †Permotanyderidae
- Genus: †Permotanyderus
- Species: †P. ableptus

Binomial name
- †Permotanyderus ableptus Riek, 1953

Extinct genus of insects

Permotanyderus is an extinct genus of protodipteran insect of the Permotanyderidae family, first described by Edgar F. Riek in Australia in 1953 and which contains a single species P. ableptus.

Evidence of the presence of Diptera or their direct predecessors in the Upper Permian of Australia is shown by the presence of Mecoptera in those formations. The Paratrichoptera of the Upper Permian probably, and those of the Triassic certainly, have been considered survivors of the maternal group. Riek described in 1953 two species of protodipteran of the Upper Permian of Australia: Permotanyderus ableptus and Choristotanyderus nanus joining Permotipula patricia named by Tillyard in 1929, but these cannot be attributed to any of the sub-groups of the dipterans or their direct predecessors.
