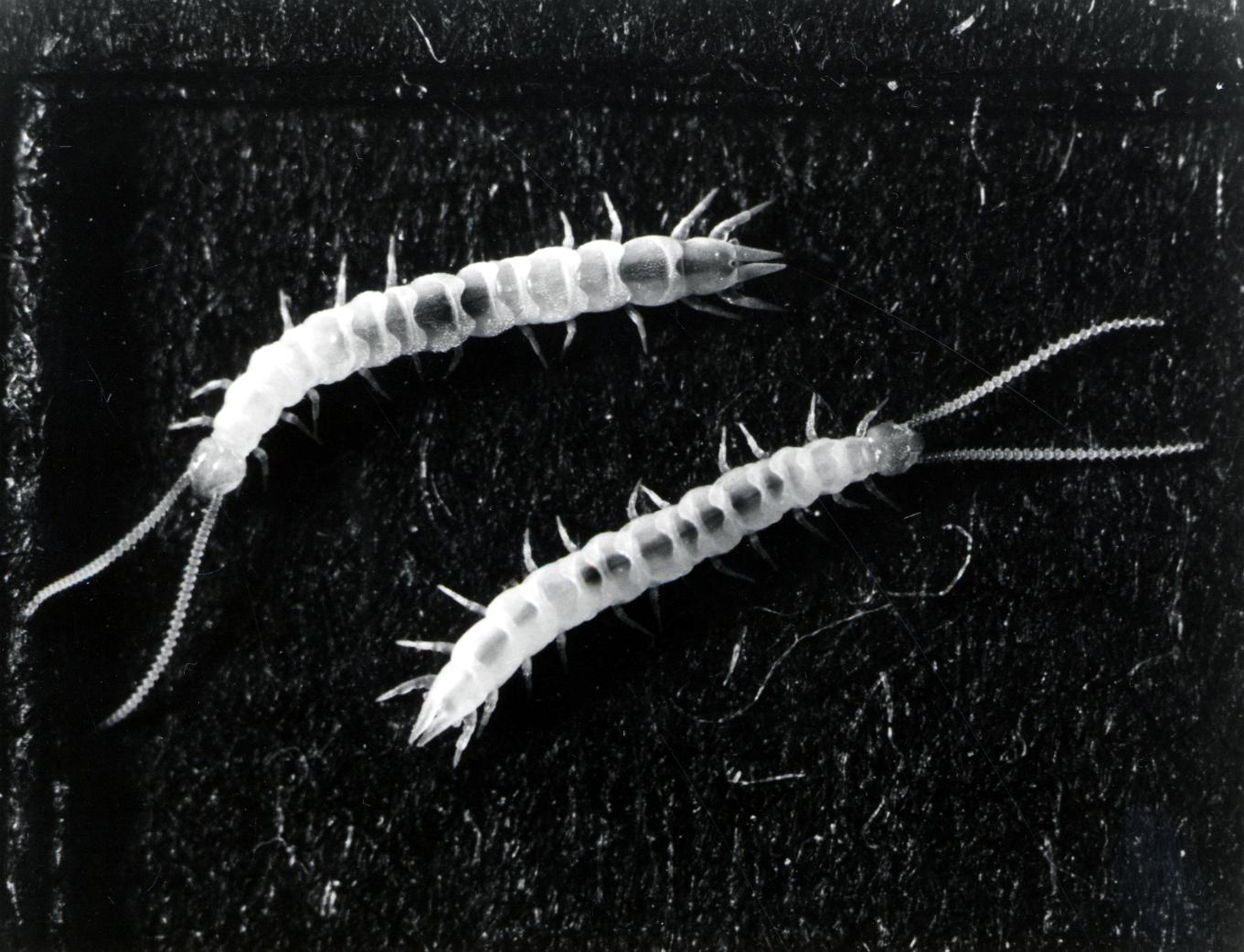

Scientific classification
- Kingdom: Animalia
- Phylum: Arthropoda
- Subphylum: Myriapoda
- Class: Symphyla
- Family: Scutigerellidae
- Genus: Scutigerella
- Species: S. immaculata

Binomial name
- Scutigerella immaculata (Newport, 1845)

Synonyms
- Scolopendrella immaculata Newport, 1845

= Scutigerella immaculata =

Species of many-legged arthropod

Scutigerella immaculata, commonly known as the garden symphylan or glasshouse symphylid, is a species of myriapod in the family Scutigerellidae. It may have originated in Europe but now has a cosmopolitan distribution and can be a pest of crops.

== Description ==
Superficially the garden symphylan resembles a centipede. It is white and up to 6 mm (0.2 in) long. It has a head with three pairs of mouthparts, a pair of long antennae and no eyes. The body is segmented, the front twelve segments each bearing a pair of short legs, while the two remaining segments are limbless. The body is covered by up to 22 dorsal, slightly sclerotised tergites. The legs work in unison, the two sides alternating.

== Distribution and habitat ==
The garden symphylan occurs in most parts of the world, having been transported inadvertently with plants: it probably originated in Europe. It lives in humus-rich soil, under stones, in leaf litter, in rotting wood, in decaying matter and in other moist places. It does not burrow but takes advantage of existing cracks. It needs high humidity levels to survive; if the relative humidity in the soil is below 75%, about 95% mortality occurs within three hours, but placing a lettuce leaf on the soil surface reduces the mortality rate considerably.

== Ecology ==
Symphylans are rapid runners and the extra tergites give the body great flexibility, so they can twist, turn and loop, manoeuvring between soil particles rapidly in order to escape predators. They primarily feed on plant roots and detritus.

The sexes are separate in the garden symphylan. The male deposits small stalked spermatophores which the female picks up, storing the sperm in receptacles in her mouth. She produces eggs singly through a gonopore on the fourth segment, and transfers them by mouth to a frond of moss or similar location, where each is fixed and smeared with sperm. Development is direct; the newly hatched juvenile has six pairs of legs, and these increase in number as the animal grows extra segments. Moulting takes place throughout the animal's life, and it may survive for up to four years.

Large populations of garden symphylan can cause damage to crops by feeding on the root hairs, roots and tubers, the plants showing loss of vigour and reduced growth. Susceptible crops include potatoes, beetroot and maize.
