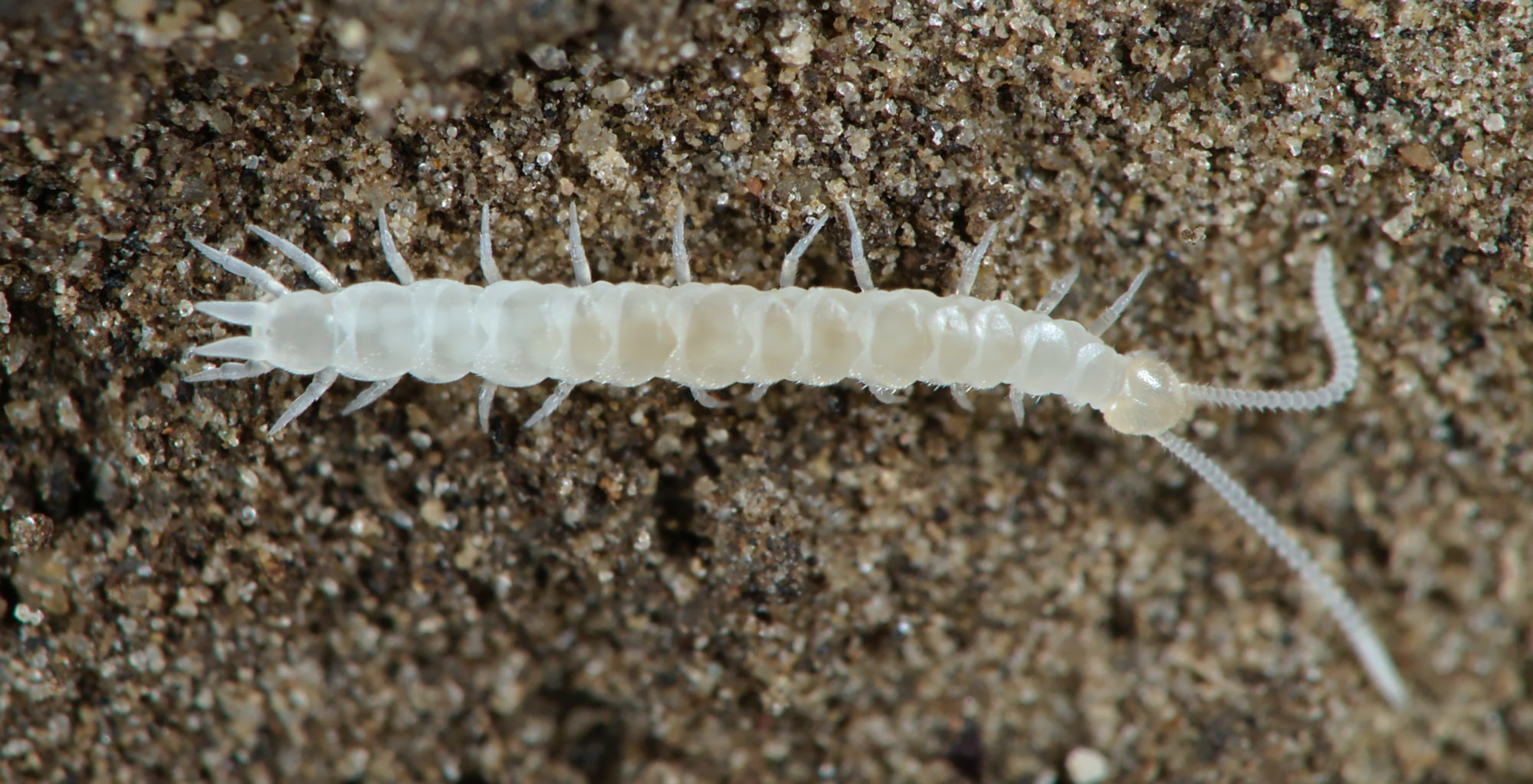

Scientific classification
- Kingdom: Animalia
- Phylum: Arthropoda
- Subphylum: Myriapoda
- Class: Symphyla
- Family: Scutigerellidae
- Genus: Scutigerella; Ryder, 1882

Type species
- Scutigerella immaculata

= Scutigerella =

Genus of symphylans

Scutigerella is a genus of symphylans in the family Scutigerellidae. This group includes at least 35 species and is the second-largest genus in this family. This genus has a subcosmopolitan distribution. This genus was first proposed in 1882 by the American zoologist John A. Ryder, who also designated S. immaculata as the type species.

== Description ==
Species in this genus vary in size and can range from 3.5 mm to 9 mm in length. The head in this genus is shaped like a heart with two lobes on the posterior margin. Spiracles open on the anterior surface of each side of the head. The antennae feature 20 to 50 segments and two kinds of setae, one thicker than the other.

Adults in this genus feature 15 tergites and 12 pairs of legs. The posterior margins of the tergites are notched. The first tergite is reduced, whereas tergites 3, 6, 9, 12, and 14 are longer and have deeper notches on the posterior margin than the others. Between the cerci, a deep U-shaped cavity lies beneath the posterior margin of the last tergite. The margins of the tergites feature many setae of various lengths.

Each of the first pair of legs features four segments, whereas each of the other legs features five segments. A well developed stylus protrudes from the base of each leg from pair 3 through 12. The legs are densely covered with setae and feature intricate sculpture patterns on some segments.

== Distribution ==
Symphylans in this genus are found mainly in the northern temperate zones. The distribution of this genus extends into the Palearctic, Nearctic, Neotropical, Afrotropical, and Indomalayan realms. This genus has also been introduced to the Australasian and Oceanian realms.

== Fossils ==
This genus is notable for including two described fossil species. Fossils of symphylans are rare and limited to specimens found in amber. The first fossil symphylan to be described was Scutigerella dominicana, which was described in 1995 based on two juvenile specimens found in Dominican amber from 25 to 40 million years ago. The first fossil symphylan to be described based on an adult specimen was Scutigerella baltica, which was described in 2004 based on a female specimen found in Baltic amber from 40 to 50 million years ago.

== Species ==
Scutigerella includes the following species:

- Scutigerella acicularis Scheller, 1986
- Scutigerella aduncus Scheller, 1986
- Scutigerella alpina Rochaix, 1955
- Scutigerella armata Hansen, 1903
- Scutigerella balaguensis Juberthie-Jupeau, 1963
- Scutigerella baltica Scheller and Wunderlich, 2004
- Scutigerella boneti Hinschberger, 1950
- Scutigerella carpatica Juberthie-Jupeau & Tabacaru, 1968
- Scutigerella causeyae Michelbacher, 1942
- Scutigerella dominicana Poinar and Edwards, 1995
- Scutigerella echinostylus Scheller, 1968
- Scutigerella hanseni Bagnall, 1913
- Scutigerella hauserae Scheller, 1990
- Scutigerella immaculata (Newport, 1845)
- Scutigerella inculta Michelbacher, 1942
- Scutigerella jupeaui Mas & Serra, 1993
- Scutigerella lineatus Edward, 1959
- Scutigerella linsleyi Michelbacher, 1942
- Scutigerella maya Hilton, 1938
- Scutigerella mexicana Hinschberger, 1950
- Scutigerella orghidani Juberthie-Jupeau & Tabacaru, 1968
- Scutigerella pagesi Jupeau, 1954
- Scutigerella palmonii Michelbacher, 1942
- Scutigerella panama Hilton, 1939
- Scutigerella remyi Juberthie-Jupeau, 1963
- Scutigerella sakimurai Scheller, 1961
- Scutigerella sbordonii Juberthie-Jupeau, 1975
- Scutigerella seposita Scheller, 1966
- Scutigerella silvatica Juberthie-Jupeau, 1963
- Scutigerella silvestrii Michelbacher, 1942
- Scutigerella subunguiculata Imms, 1908
- Scutigerella tasma Hilton, 1943
- Scutigerella tescorum Scheller, 1973
- Scutigerella thaleri Scheller, 1966
- Scutigerella tusca Juberthie-Jupeau, 1962
- Scutigerella verhoeffi Michelbacher, 1942
