= Choristotanyderus =

Choristotanyderus nanus Temporal range: Upper Permian

Scientific classification
- Domain: Eukaryota
- Kingdom: Animalia
- Phylum: Arthropoda
- Class: Insecta
- Order: Mecoptera
- Family: †Permotanyderidae
- Genus: †Choristotanyderus
- Species: †C. nanus

Binomial name
- †Choristotanyderus nanus Riek, 1953

Extinct genus of insects

Choristotanyderus is an extinct, monotypic genus of protodipteran insect containing a single species, Choristotanyderus nanus which lived during the Permian period. The genus and species were first described by Edgar Frederick Riek in 1953 from a specimen found in New South Wales, Australia. It is considered a transitional form between Mecoptera and Diptera. The genus is placed in the protodipteran family Permotanyderidae with the related genus Permotanyderus.

== Morphology ==
Choristotanyderus, despite being closely related to Diptera, retained four wings, with the hind wings being about one third as long as the forewings. These wings show the characteristic kink at the base of the R vein which is diagnostic of Diptera, but other venation patterns were more characteristic of Mecoptera . The third thorax segment was also reduced, which has been considered another intermediate feature between the Mecoptera and the Diptera .
