= Permotipulidae =

Scientific classification
- Kingdom: Animalia
- Phylum: Arthropoda
- Clade: Pancrustacea
- Class: Insecta
- Order: Mecoptera
- Suborder: †Protodiptera
- Family: †Permotipulidae; Tillyard, 1929

Genera
- Permotipula; Permila

Extinct family of insects

Permotipulidae is an extinct family of insects within the order Protodiptera. Permotipulidae appeared in the Permian. Two genera are Permotipula and Permila which are close relatives to flies.
