= Permotanyderidae =

Scientific classification
- Domain: Eukaryota
- Kingdom: Animalia
- Phylum: Arthropoda
- Class: Insecta
- Order: Mecoptera
- Suborder: †Protodiptera
- Family: †Permotanyderidae; Riek, 1953

Genera
- Choristotanyderus; Permotanyderus

Extinct family of insects

Permotanyderidae is an extinct family of insects within the order Protodiptera.

Along with Permotipulidae (Permotipula and Permila, Willmann, 1989) and the Robinjohniidae (Robinjohnia, Scherbakov ET to., 1995), the somewhat more distantly related Permotanyderidae forms a group of mecopteroids of the Late Permian of Australia and Eurasia (250-260 Ma) that represents the older close relatives of the true flies. The first two genera had separate wings (presumably the front), while the last two have been created from complete specimens: The Robinjohniidae had four wings of about the same size, while the hind wings of the Choristotanyderus nanus (Permotanyderidae) specimens had a size of about half of the front, and the mesothorax was great. In all these genera the wing venation was low compared with other mecopteroids and close to the hypothetical original venation of the Diptera (Hennig, 1973; Willmann, 1989).
