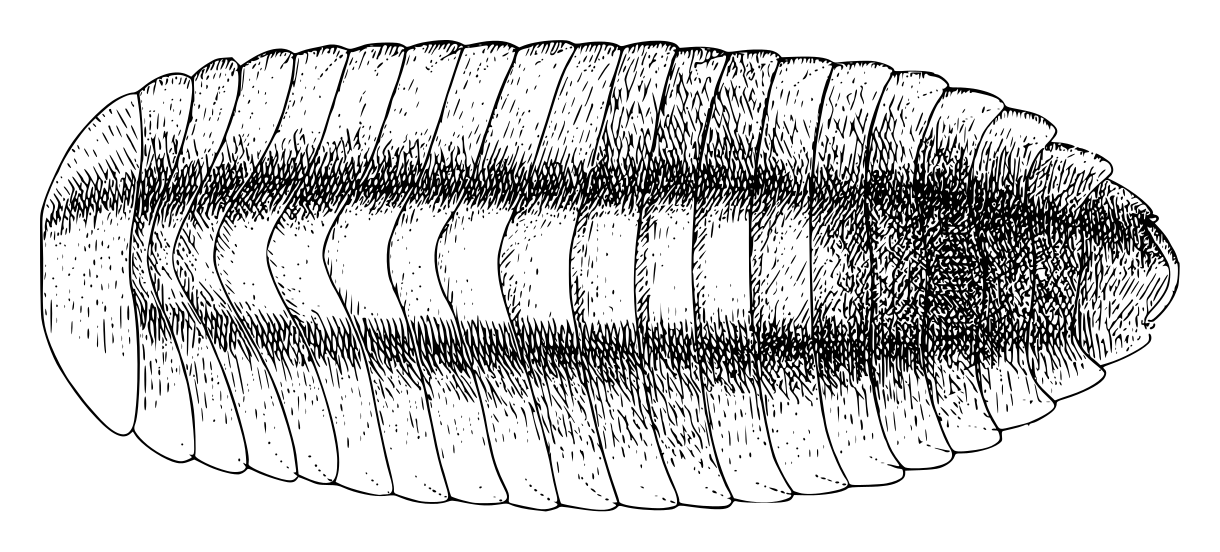
- Termitodesmus ceylonicus

Scientific classification
- Kingdom: Animalia
- Phylum: Arthropoda
- Subphylum: Myriapoda
- Class: Diplopoda
- Order: Glomeridesmida
- Family: Termitodesmidae; Silvestri, 1911

= Termitodesmidae =

Family of millipedes

Termitodesmidae is a family of millipedes belonging to the order Glomeridesmida. These millipedes are found in India, Sri Lanka, and Vietnam. The five known species in this family are notable in that they are found only in termite mounds. Termitodesmidae is the only myriapod family known to depend on insects in such a commensal relationship.

== Description ==
In millipedes in this family, the head is not visible from above, and the antennae are shorter than the head is wide. The first tergite (the collum) is larger than the tergites that follow. The legs are densely covered with long spines. The female gonopore is a simple vulva without an elongated ovipositor. Males are unknown in this family.

== Genus and species ==
This family includes only one genus:

- Termitodesmus Silvestri, 1911

This genus contains five species:

- Termitodesmus calvus Attems, 1938
- Termitodesmus ceylonicus Silvestri, 1911
- Termitodesmus escherichii Silvestri, 1911
- Termitodesmus fletcheri Hirst, 1913
- Termitodesmus lefroyi Hirst, 1911
