= Protodiptera =

Protodiptera Temporal range: Permian

Scientific classification
- Domain: Eukaryota
- Kingdom: Animalia
- Phylum: Arthropoda
- Class: Insecta
- Order: Mecoptera
- Suborder: †Protodiptera

Families
- Permotanyderidae; Permotipulidae

Order of insects

Protodiptera is an extinct suborder of mecopteran insects containing the two families Permotanyderidae and Permotipulidae with a total of four genera Choristotanyderus, Permila, Permotanyderus and Permotipula.
