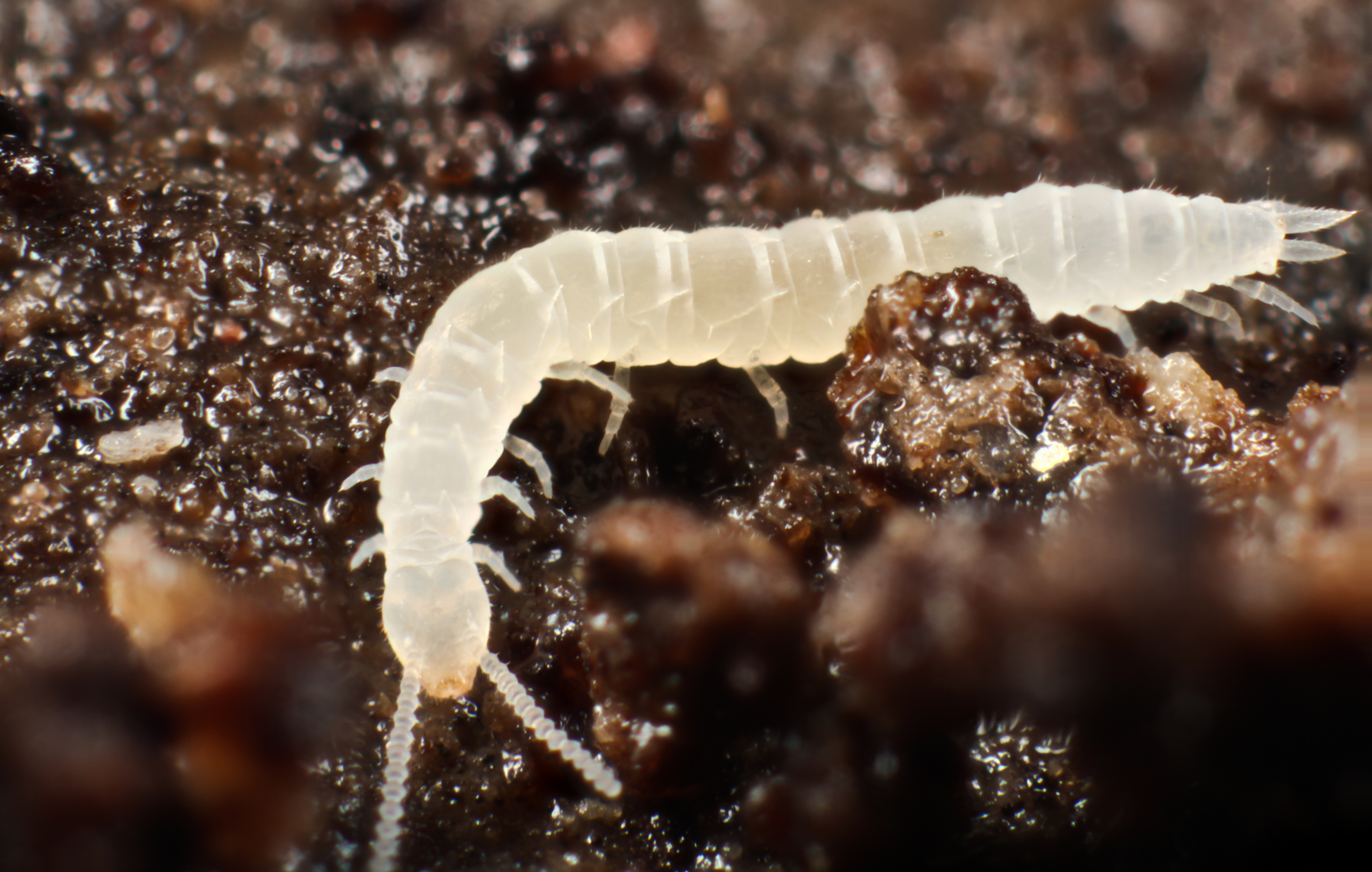
- A scolopendrellid from Great Britain

Scientific classification
- Kingdom: Animalia
- Phylum: Arthropoda
- Subphylum: Myriapoda
- Class: Symphyla
- Family: Scolopendrellidae; Newport, 1844

Genera
- See text

= Scolopendrellidae =

Scolopendrellidae Temporal range: Cenomanian–Recent

Family of many-legged arthropods

Scolopendrellidae is a family of pseudocentipedes in the class Symphyla. This family includes nine genera and at least 97 described species. This family has a subcosmopolitan distribution.

== Description ==
Symphylans in this family usually measure less than 4 mm in length. In this family, the head and neck are not distinctly separated. The antennae usually have fewer than 20 articles and feature two types of setae, with only small branched sensory organs on the most distal segment. The tergites range from 15 to 24 in number. The first tergite can be well developed or quite reduced in size. The area at the end of each of the cerci (spinnerets) is usually striated (i.e., striped).

In this family, the first pair of legs is reduced in size and is never more than half as long as the next pair. In some species, the first leg pair is rudimentary or absent. In the genus Symphylella, for example, these legs are vestigial and reduced to small protuberances, and in the genus Ribautiella, these legs are only rudimentary. In this family, the styli at the base of the legs are poorly developed or rudimentary.

== Fossils ==
Fossils of symphylans are rare and limited to specimens found in amber. This family includes only one species described from a fossil: Symphylella patrickmuelleri, which was discovered in Myanmar and described based on a juvenile found in Burmese amber from the Cenomanian age of the mid Cretaceous period. This specimen is the only fossil representative of this family and dates from about 99 million years ago.

== Genera and distribution ==
This family includes the following nine genera:

- Geophilella Ribaut, 1913
- Neosymphyla Edwards & Belfield, 1967
- Parviapiciella Mas & Serra, 1993
- Remysymphyla Aubry & Masson, 1952
- Ribautiella Brölemann, 1926
- Scolopendrella Gervais, 1839
- Scolopendrellopsis Bagnall, 1913
- Symphylella Silvestri, 1902
- Symphylellina Brölemann, 1931

The genus Symphylella is the largest in this family, with at least 61 species, followed by the genus Scolopendrellopsis, with at least 17 species. The genera Symphylella and Scolopendrellopsis have subcosmopolitan distributions. The genus Ribautiella is the third largest in this family, with nine species, and has a broad distribution in the Neotropical and Afrotropical realms. The genus Remysymphyla is smaller, with only four species, and has a broad distribution in the Palearctic, Afrotropical, and Indomalayan realms. The genus Geophilelia includes only two species and is limited to the Nearctic and Palearctic realms. The other four genera are monotypic and have more limited distributions, with Neosymphyla in the Afrotropical realm, Parviapiciella in the Palearctic realm (in the Mediterranean region, North Africa, and central Europe), Scolopendrella in the western Palearctic realm, and Symphylellina in the Loyalty Islands.
