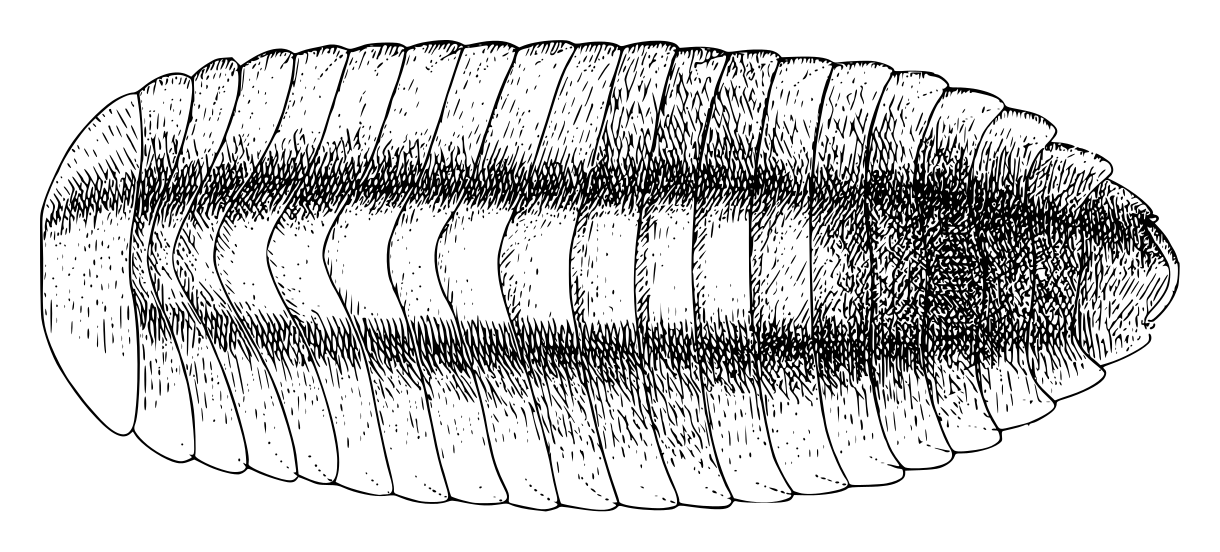
- Termitodesmus ceylonicus
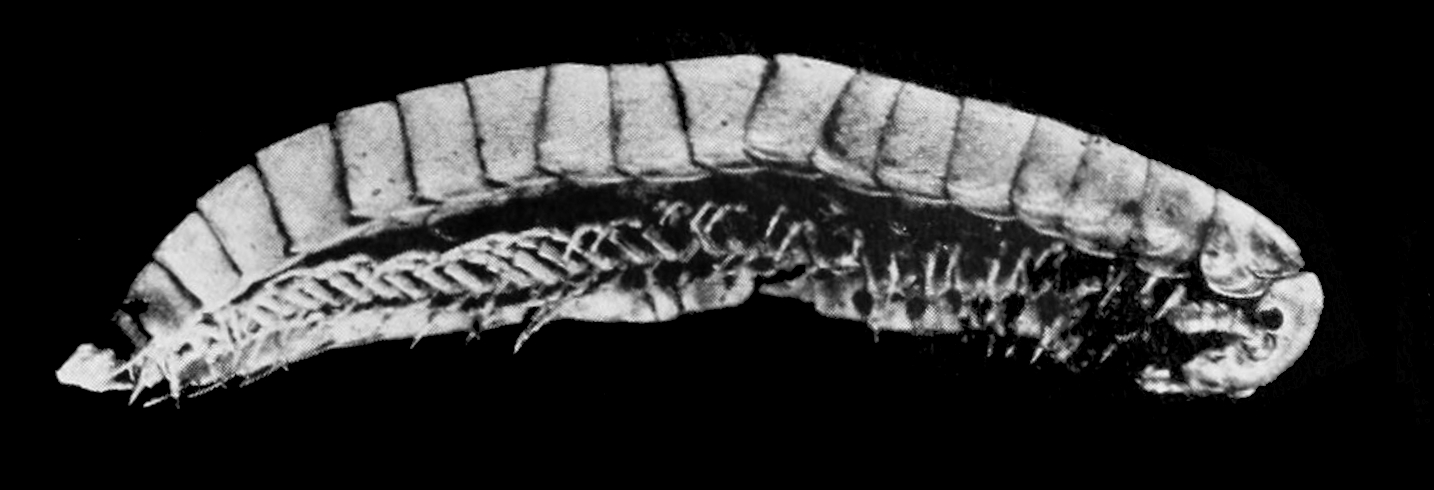
- Glomeridesmus trinidadensis

Scientific classification
- Kingdom: Animalia
- Phylum: Arthropoda
- Subphylum: Myriapoda
- Class: Diplopoda
- Subclass: Chilognatha
- Infraclass: Pentazonia
- Superorder: Limacomorpha; Pocock, 1894
- Order: Glomeridesmida; Cook, 1895

Families
- Glomeridesmidae Latzel, 1884; Termitodesmidae Silvestri, 1911

= Glomeridesmida =

Order of millipedes

Glomeridesmida is an order of millipedes in the infraclass Pentazonia containing two families (Glomeridesmidae and Termitodesmidae) and at least 35 described species. Glomeridesmida is the only living order of the superorder Limacomorpha. Glomeridesmidans are also known as slug millipedes.

== Description ==
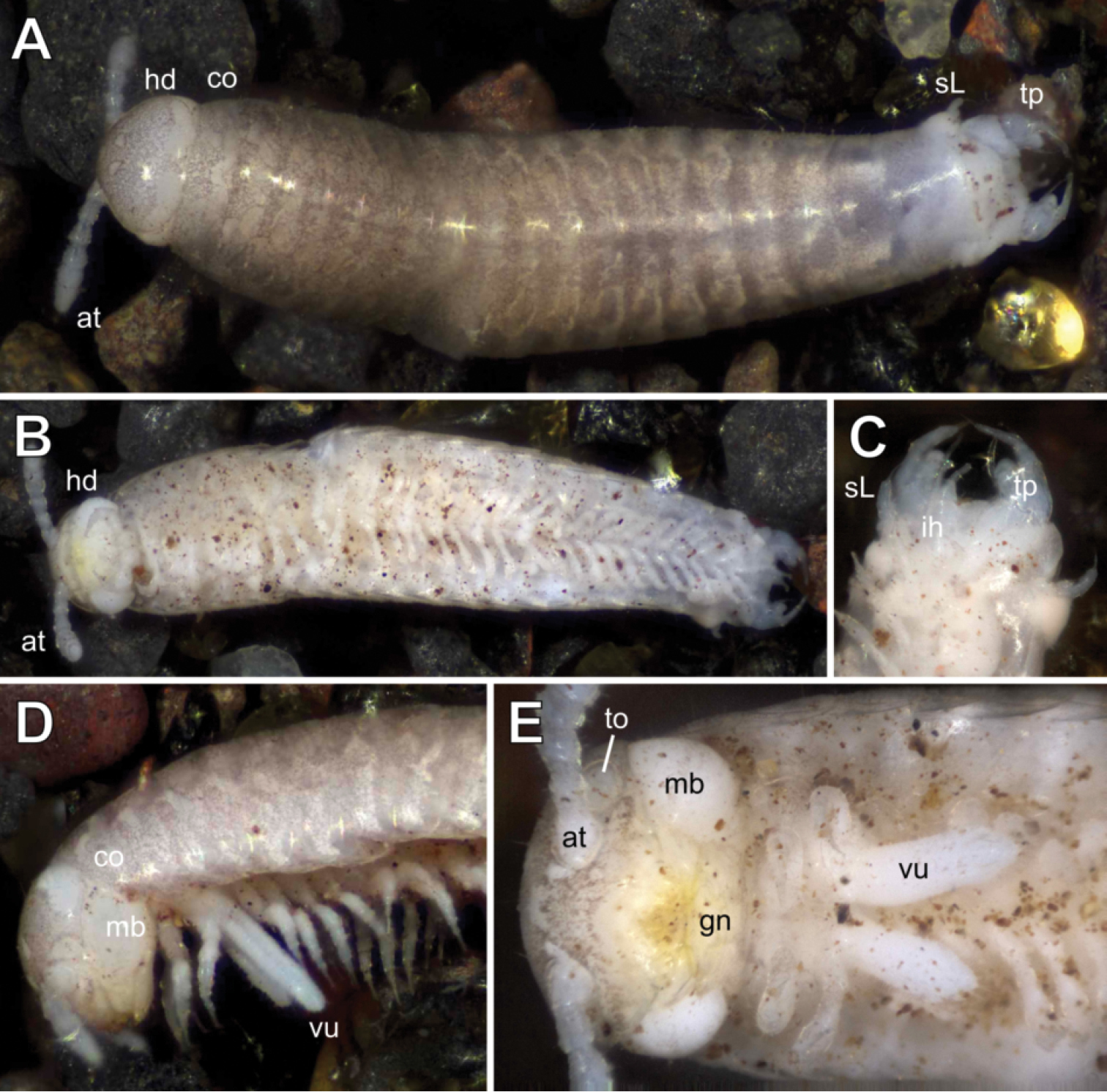
Glomeridesmus siamensis (A) male, dorsal view; (B) male, ventral view; (C) telopods; (D) female, lateral view; (E) female, ventral view

Millipedes in this order are small, usually 4 to 8 mm (0.16 to 0.31 in.) long, with the largest reaching 15 mm (0.59 in) in length. These millipedes are somewhat flattened, and unlike other orders of Pentazonia, are unable to roll into a ball. Glomeridesmidans have antennae with seven segments but are blind and lack ommatidia. The penultimate pair of legs in males are modified into telopods. In most species, females feature a very long ovipositor.

Most adult females in this order have 36 pairs of legs and 21 segments, counting 20 tergites plus the anal shield. Male specimens in this order are rare, unknown for all species in the family Termitodesmidae, and known for only a small number of species in the family Glomeridesmidae. Descriptions of mature males in at least four species (Glomeridesmus spelaeus, G. siamensis, G. arcostriatus, and G. marmoreus) report 35 leg pairs, including a pair of telopods, and 20 segments, one fewer than the 21 segments found in adult females.

Some species, however, seem to deviate from the most common body plan. The description of an adult male of G. indus, for example, reports 37 pairs of legs, including a pair of telopods, and the same 21 segments normally found in adult females. Furthermore, the description of a species from another genus (Glomeridesmoides termitophilus) reports some deviations from the usual pattern, describing females with the usual 21 segments but only 35 leg pairs and two males with the same 21 segments (with 34 and 35 leg pairs, including a pair of telopods). Millipedes in this order develop by hemianamorphosis, with leg and segment number decoupled such that individuals may reach the full complement of one before the other.

== Habitats ==
Millipedes in this order are typically found in soil or ground litter in forests. Two species (Glomeridesmus spelaeus and G. sbordonii), however, are known cave-dwellers and exhibit troglomorphic adaptations such as loss of pigment. The five known species of Termitodesmus (constituting the family Termitodesmidae) are even more unusual in that they are found only in termite mounds. Termitodesmidae is the only myriapod family known to depend on insects in such a commensal relationship.

== Distribution ==
Millipedes in this order are found in tropical regions. The species in the family Glomeridesmidae are found in Middle and South America, India, Southeast Asia, the East Indies and Oceania. The species in the family Termitodesmidae are found in India, Sri Lanka, and Vietnam.
