= Permotipula =

Permotipula Temporal range: Late Permian

Scientific classification
- Domain: Eukaryota
- Kingdom: Animalia
- Phylum: Arthropoda
- Class: Insecta
- Order: Mecoptera
- Family: †Permotipulidae
- Genus: †Permotipula; Tillyard, 1929
- Species: †P. patricia

Binomial name
- †Permotipula patricia Tillyard, 1929

Extinct genus of insects

Permotipula is an extinct monotypic genus of protodipteran insect which contains a single species Permotipula patricia. The only specimen of Permotipula was found in Late Permian strata of the Newcastle Coal Measures between the towns of Belmont and Warners Bay on the eastern side of Lake Macquarie, New South Wales, Australia and named by Robert J. Tillyard in 1929 in honour of his wife Patricia Tillyard. The specimen consisting of a single well preserved wing, was considered lost after the death of Tillyard in 1937. The loss of the specimen and the mention by Tillyard of a second insect fossil from the same site, later described as Robinjohnia tillyardi resulted in much confusion regarding the taxonomic affiliations of P. patricia. Robinjohnia, a four winged insect which is now placed in the order Mecoptera. The P. patricia type specimen was found in the Tillyard collection which is housed at the British Museum and reexamined by R. Willmann in a 1989 paper. A second species, P. borealis was named by O.M. Martynova in 1961 from a small wing specimen found in the Kuznetsk Basin, Russia. This species was moved, however, in 1989 by R. Willmann to the monotypic genus Permila and is now considered a probable early mecopteran.
