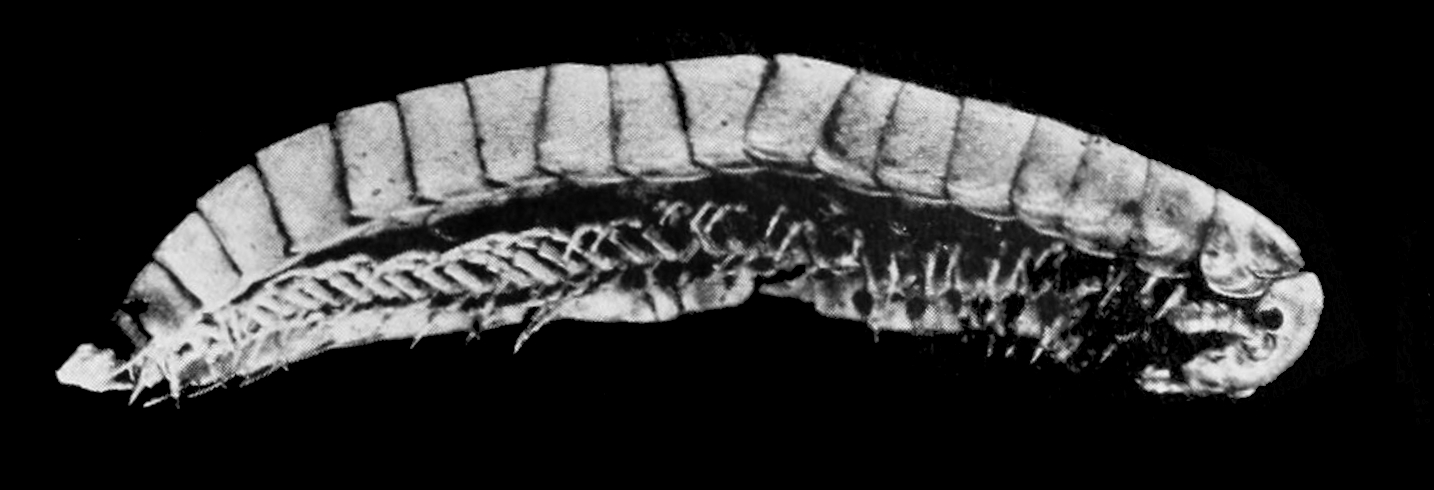
- Glomeridesmus trinidadensis

Scientific classification
- Kingdom: Animalia
- Phylum: Arthropoda
- Subphylum: Myriapoda
- Class: Diplopoda
- Order: Glomeridesmida
- Family: Glomeridesmidae; Latzel, 1884

Diversity
- 2 genera, 31 species

= Glomeridesmidae =

Family of millipedes

Glomeridesmidae is a millipede family of the order Glomeridesmida. This family includes two genera: The genus Glomeridesmus includes most species in this family; the genus Glomeridesmoides includes one species. The species in this family are found in Middle and South America, India, Southeast Asia, the East Indies and Oceania.

== Description ==
In millipedes in this family, the head is visible from above, and the antennae are much longer than the head is wide. The first tergite (the collum) is smaller than the tergites that follow. The legs are sparesely covered with isolated spines. The female has an elongated ovipositor.

Most adult females in this family have 36 pairs of legs and 21 segments, counting 20 tergites plus the anal shield. Male specimens in this family are rare and known for only a few species. Descriptions of mature males in at least four species (Glomeridesmus spelaeus, G. siamensis, G. arcostriatus, and G. marmoreus) report 35 pairs of legs, including a pair of telopods, and 20 segments, one fewer than the 21 segments found in adult females.

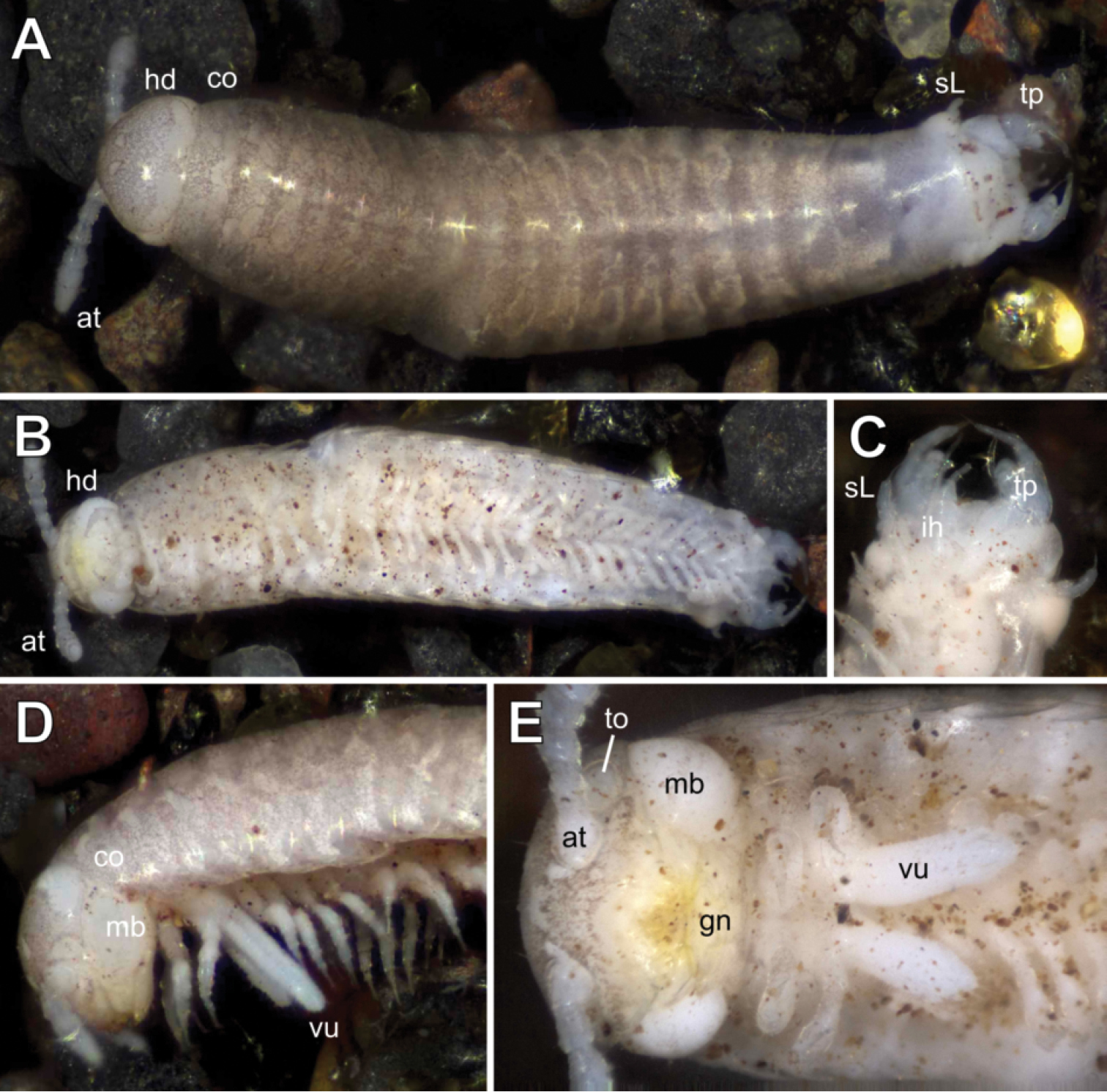
Glomeridesmus siamensis (A) male, dorsal view; (B) male, ventral view; (C) telopods; (D) female, lateral view; (E) female, ventral view.

Some species, however, seem to deviate from the most common body plan. The description of an adult male of G. indus, for example, reports 37 pairs of legs, including a pair of telopods, and the same 21 segments are normally found in adult females. Furthermore, the description of a species from another genus (Glomeridesmoides termitophilus) reports some deviations from the usual pattern, describing females with the usual 21 segments but only 35 leg pairs and two males with the same 21 segments (with 34 and 35 leg pairs, including a pair of telopods). Millipedes in this family develop by hemianamorphosis, with leg and segment numbers decoupled such that individuals may reach the full complement of one before the other.

== Genera ==
- Glomeridesmoides
- Glomeridesmus
