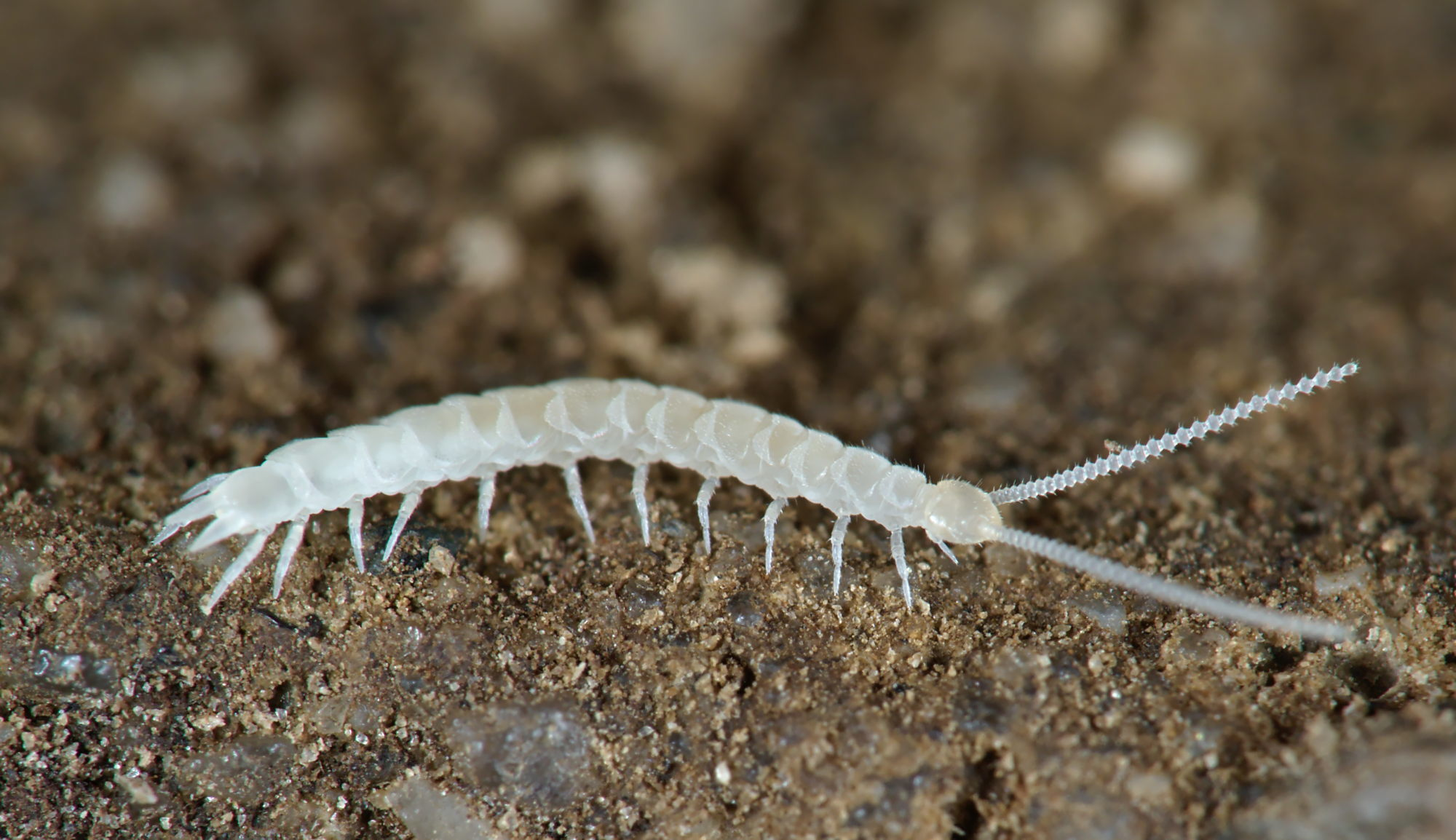
- Scutigerella sp. (Scutigerellidae)
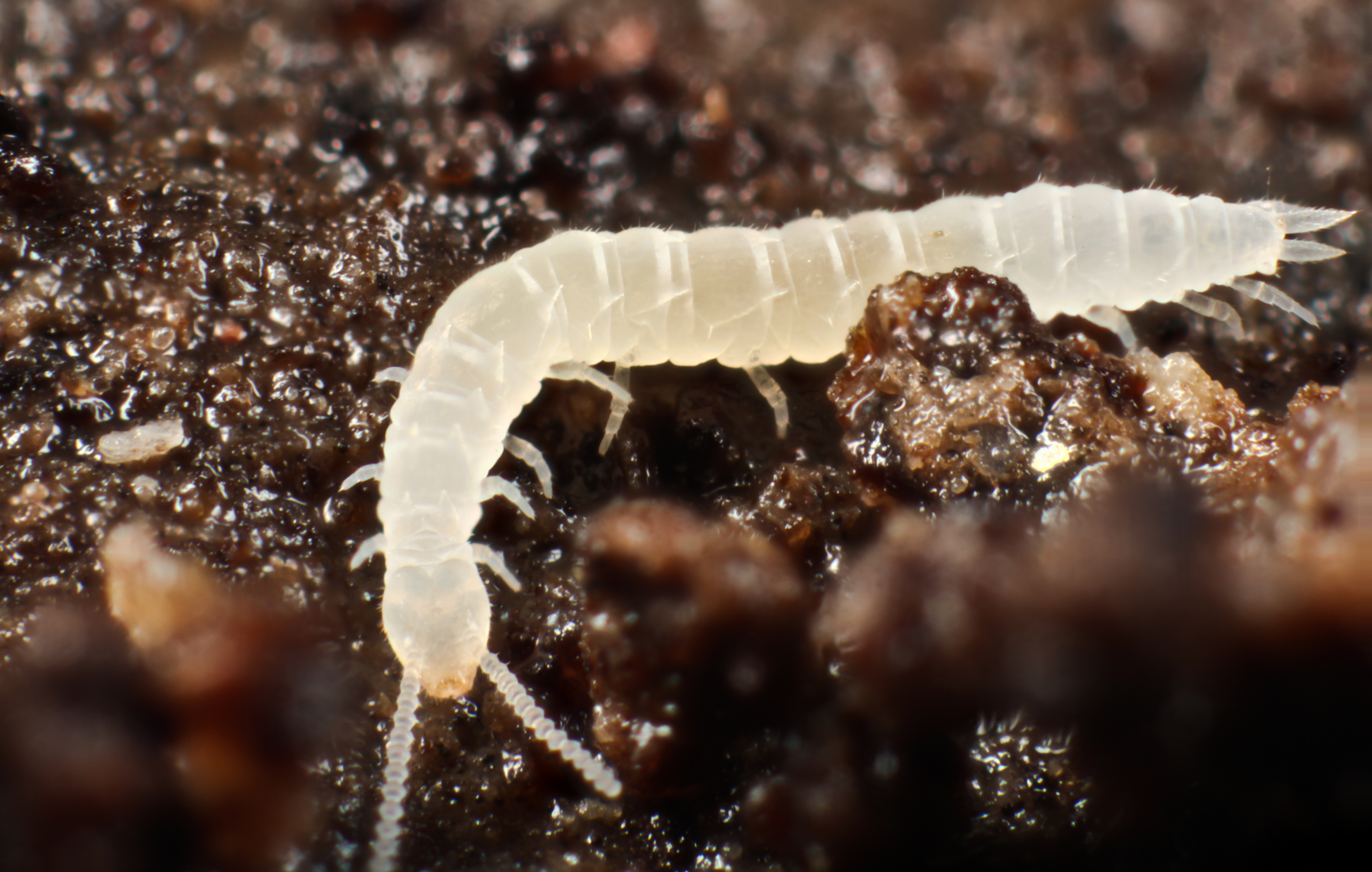
- Scolopendrellid symphylan (Scolopendrellidae)

Scientific classification
- Kingdom: Animalia
- Phylum: Arthropoda
- Subphylum: Myriapoda
- Class: Symphyla; Ryder, 1880

Families
- Scutigerellidae; Scolopendrellidae

= Symphyla =

Symphyla Temporal range: 99–0 Ma Mid Cretaceous to Present

Class of many-legged arthropods

Symphylans, also known as garden centipedes or pseudocentipedes, are soil-dwelling arthropods of the class Symphyla in the subphylum Myriapoda. Symphylans resemble centipedes but are very small, non-venomous, and may or may not form a clade with centipedes. More than 200 species are known worldwide.

Symphyla are primarily herbivores and detritus feeders living deep in the soil, under stones, in decaying wood, and in other moist places. They are rapid runners, can move quickly through the pores between soil particles, and are typically found from the surface down to a depth of about 50 centimetres (20 in). They consume decaying vegetation but can do considerable harm in an agricultural setting by consuming seeds, roots, and root hairs in cultivated soil. For example, the garden symphylan, Scutigerella immaculata can be a pest of crops. A species of Hanseniella has been recorded as a pest of sugar cane and pineapples in Queensland. A few species are found in trees and in caves. A species of Symphylella has been shown to be predominantly predatory, and some species are saprophagous.

== Description ==
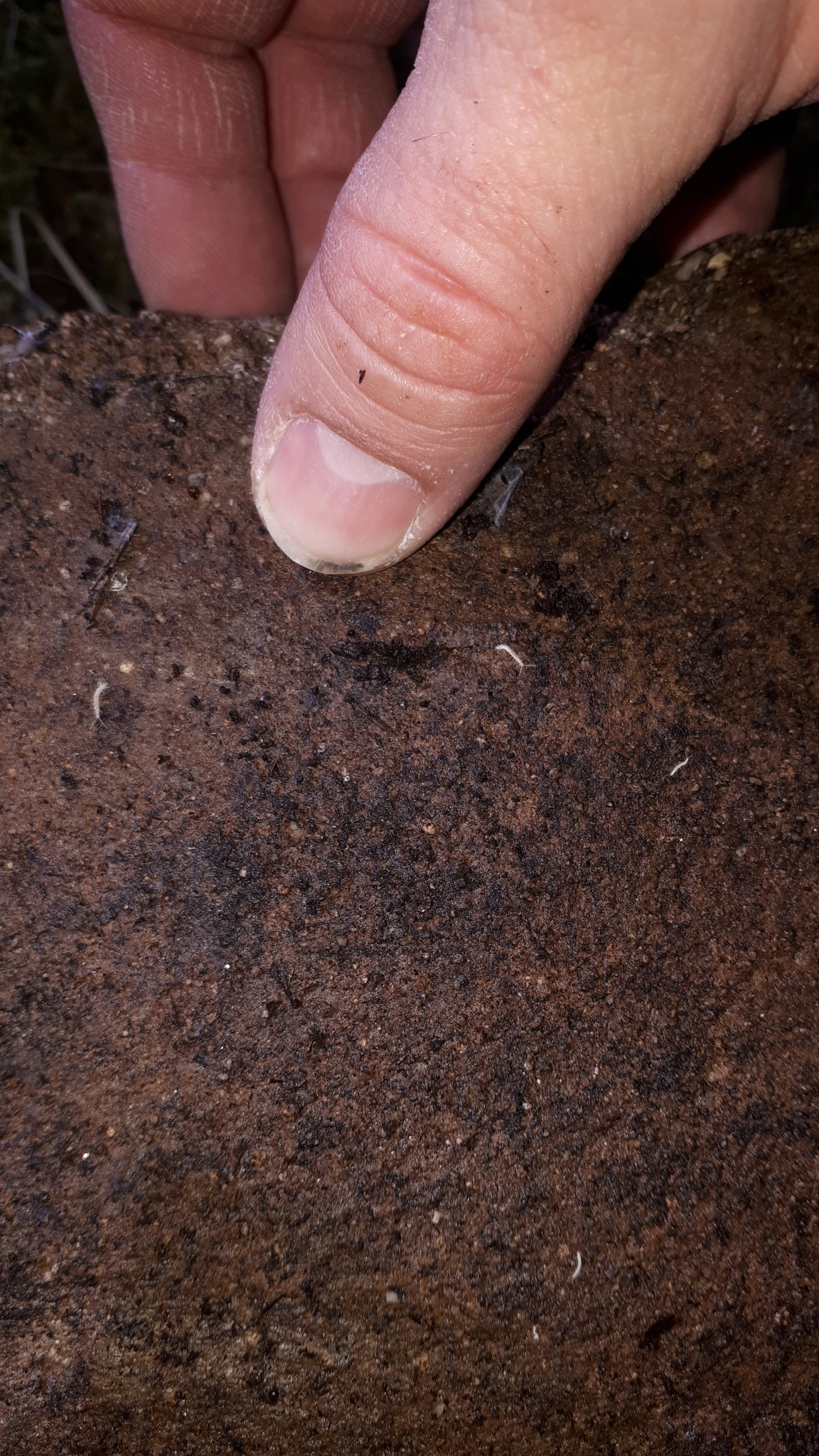
Individuals of Scutigerella sp. (left, top) and Scolopendrellidae (right, bottom), showing their small size

Symphyla are small, cryptic myriapods without eyes and without pigment. The body is soft and generally 2 to 10 millimetres (0.08 to 0.4 in) long, divided into two body regions: head and trunk. An exceptional size is reached in Hanseniella magna, which attains lengths of 12–13 mm (0.5 in).

The head has long, segmented antennae, a postantennal organ, three pairs of mouthparts: mandibles, the long first maxillae, and the second pair of maxillae which are fused to form the lower lip or labium of the mouth. The antennae serve as sense organs. Disc-like organs of Tömösváry, which probably sense vibrations, are attached to the base of the antennae, as they are in centipedes.

The trunk comprises 14 segments, which are covered by microhairs on the lateral and ventral integument and by a various number of dorsal tergal plates, from 15 in Scutigerella and Hanseniella, and up till 24 in Ribautiella, increasing the flexibility of the body. Legs are found on the first 12 segments. The 13th segment, which is fused with the 12th segment, bears a pair of spinnerets that resemble cerci, and the 14th segment has a pair of long sensory hairs (trichobothria). Around the anal opening there is a small telson. Symphylans have been reported as living up to four years, and moult throughout their life. Immature individuals have six or seven pairs of legs on hatching, but they add an additional pair at each moult until the adult instar, which usually has twelve pairs of legs. This mode of development is known as hemianamorphosis. Although most adult symphylans have twelve leg pairs, the first pair is absent or vestigial in some species (e.g., those in the genus Symphylella), so adults in some species have only eleven leg pairs. The species with 12 pairs are the only myriapods with walking legs on the first body segment, as the first pair of legs are modified into forcipules in centipedes, in pauropods this segment is a reduced collum which bears ventrally a pair of small papillae, and in millipedes this segment is a collum without any appendages at all.

Symphylans have several features linking them to early insects, such as a labium (fused second maxillae), an identical number of head segments, and certain features of their legs. Each pair of legs is associated with an eversible structure called a "coxal sac", which helps the animal absorb moisture, and a small stylus that may be sensory in function. Similar structures are found in the most primitive insects.

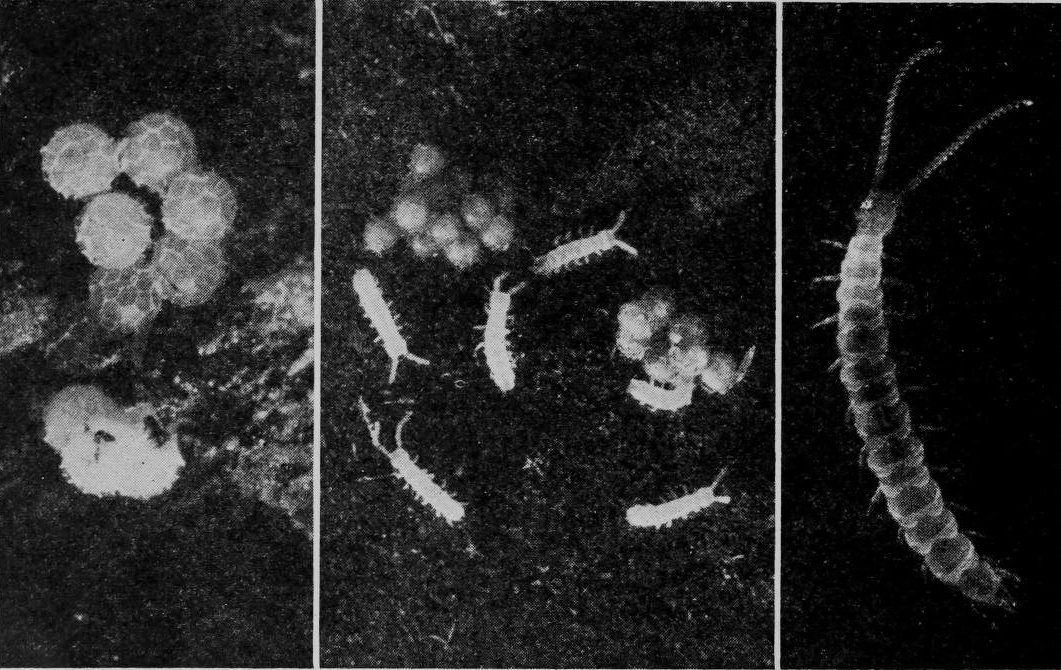
Life stages of symphylans: eggs, juvenile, and adult Scutigerella immaculata

Symphylans breathe through a pair of spiracles on the sides of their head and are the only arthropods with spiracle openings on the head. These are connected to a system of tracheae that branch through the head and the first three segments of the body only.

The genital openings are located on the fourth body segment, but the animals do not copulate. Instead, the male deposits 150 to 450 packages of sperm, or spermatophores, on small stalks. The female then picks these up in her mouth, which contains special pouches for storing the sperm. She then lays her eggs, and attaches them to the sides of crevices or to moss or lichen with her mouth, smearing the sperm over them as she does so. The eggs are laid in groups of eight to twelve.

The spinnerets produce secretions that turn into a silk-like thread. One fossil species, Symphylella patrickmuelleri, was found preserved in Burmese amber releasing long threads of silk. The silk plays a role in reproduction: the male deposits up to 450 spermatophores on stalks of silk. Symphylans have also been reported releasing silk as a defense and to suspend themselves in the air.

== Fossil record and evolution ==
The symphylan fossil record is poorly known, with only five species recorded, all placed in living genera. The oldest records of both families are found in Burmese amber from the middle Cretaceous, approximately 99 million years ago. As a result, both families are thought to have diverged before the end of the Mesozoic Era.

Despite their common name, morphological studies commonly place symphylans as more closely related to millipedes and pauropods than the centipedes, in the clade Progoneata. Molecular studies have shown conflicting results, with some supporting the Progoneata clade, others aligning symphylans with centipedes or other arthropods, although some are weakly supported. The clade is believed to be monophyletic.
