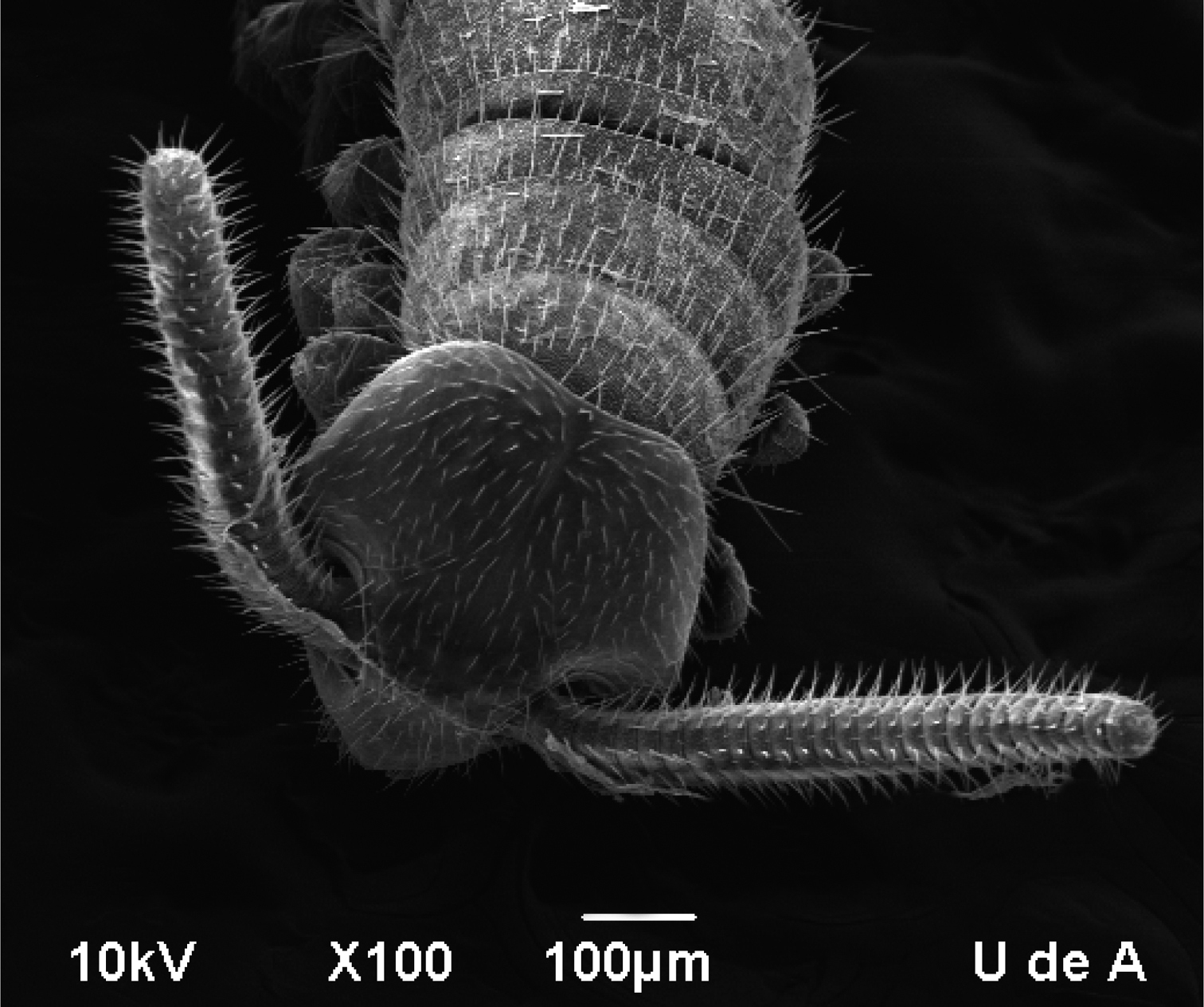

Scientific classification
- Kingdom: Animalia
- Phylum: Arthropoda
- Subphylum: Myriapoda
- Class: Symphyla
- Family: Scutigerellidae; Bagnall, 1913

Genera
- See text

= Scutigerellidae =

Scutigerellidae Temporal range: Cenomanian–Recent

Family of many-legged arthropods

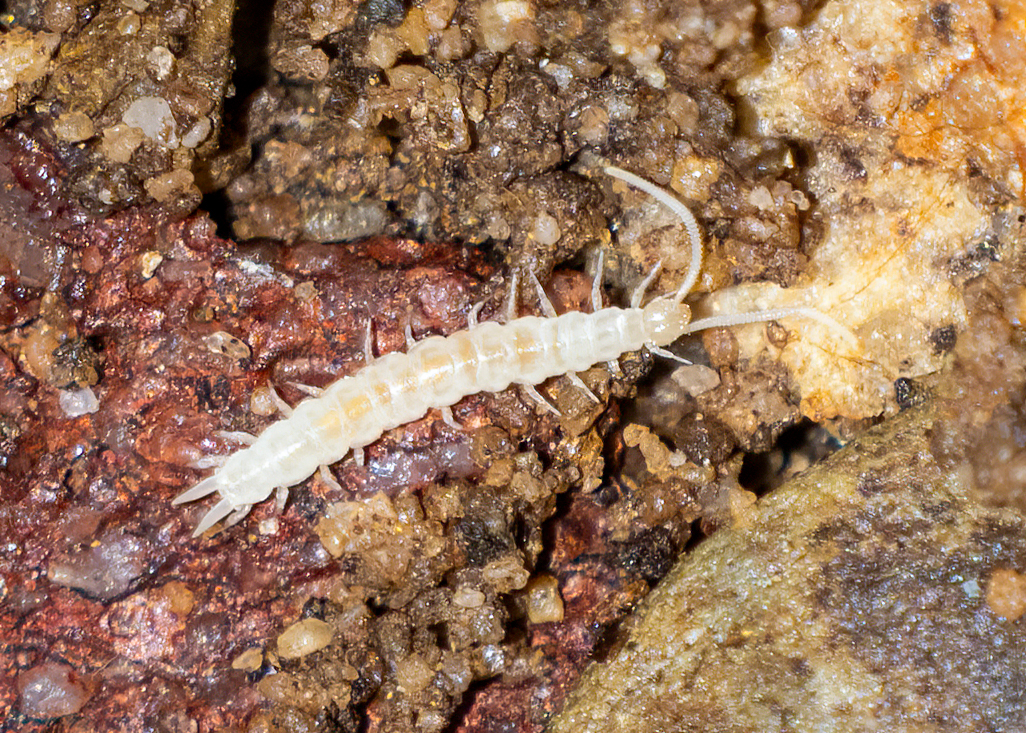
Scutigerellid in Tennessee

Scutigerellidae is a family of pseudocentipedes in the class Symphyla. There are five genera and at least 138 described species in this family. This family has a subcosmopolitan distribution.

== Description ==
Symphylans in this family usually measure more than 4 mm in length. In this family, the head and neck are distinctly separated. The antennae usually feature more than 20 articles with a large branched organ on the most distal article. The adult in this family features 15 simple tergites, with the first tergite reduced in size, and 12 pairs of legs. The area at the end of each of the cerci (spinnerets) is smooth.

Each leg pair corresponds to a single tergite except for the fourth, sixth, and eighth leg pairs, which each correspond to two tergites. The first pair of legs is well developed and more than half the length of the next pair. Well developed styli protrude from the base of the legs, each with two or more setae.

== Fossils ==
Fossils of symphylans are rare and limited to specimens found in amber. This family includes three species described from fossils. The first fossil symphylan to be described was Scutigerella dominicana, which was described in 1995 based on two juvenile specimens found in Dominican amber from 25 to 40 million years ago. The first fossil symphylan to be described based on an adult specimen was Scutigerella baltica, which was described in 2004 based on a female specimen found in Baltic amber. The third fossil symphylan in this family, Hanseniella baltica, was also described in 2004, based on a female subadult that was also found in Baltic amber. Both S. baltica and H. baltica were found in Eocene amber from 40 to 50 million years ago, making these two symphylans the oldest described species in this family. Other fossil specimens assigned to this family are from undescribed species, including two older fossils found in Myanmar in Burmese amber from the Cenomanian age, about 99 million years ago.

== Genera and distribution ==
This family includes the following five genera:

- Hanseniella Bagnall, 1913
- Millotellina Jupeau, 1954
- Scolopendrelloides Bagnall, 1913
- Scopoliella Scheller, 1986
- Scutigerella Ryder, 1882

The genus Hanseniella is the largest in this family, with at least 80 species, followed by the genus Scutigerella, with at least 35 species. The genera Hanseniella and Scutigerella have subcosmopolitan distributions. The genus Hanseniella is especially widespread in the southern hemisphere. The genus Scutigerella is found in the Neotropical, Nearctic, Palearctic, Afrotropical, and Indomalayan realms and has also been introduced into the Australasian and Oceanian realms. The genera Millotellina and Scolopendrelloides are smaller, each with only 11 species. The genus Millotellina has a broad distribution, including the Afrotropical, Indomalayan, Australasian, and Oceanian realms. The genus Scolopendrelloides has a broad distribution in the Indomalayan and Australasian realms. The genus Scopoliella includes only one species, which is found in the Nearctic realm (in Mexico).
