= Permila =

Scientific classification
- Domain: Eukaryota
- Kingdom: Animalia
- Phylum: Arthropoda
- Class: Insecta
- Order: Mecoptera
- Family: †Permotanyderidae
- Genus: †Permila; Willmann, 1989
- Species: †P. borealis

Binomial name
- †Permila borealis (Martynova, 1961)

Extinct genus of insects

Permila borealis is an extinct insect.
