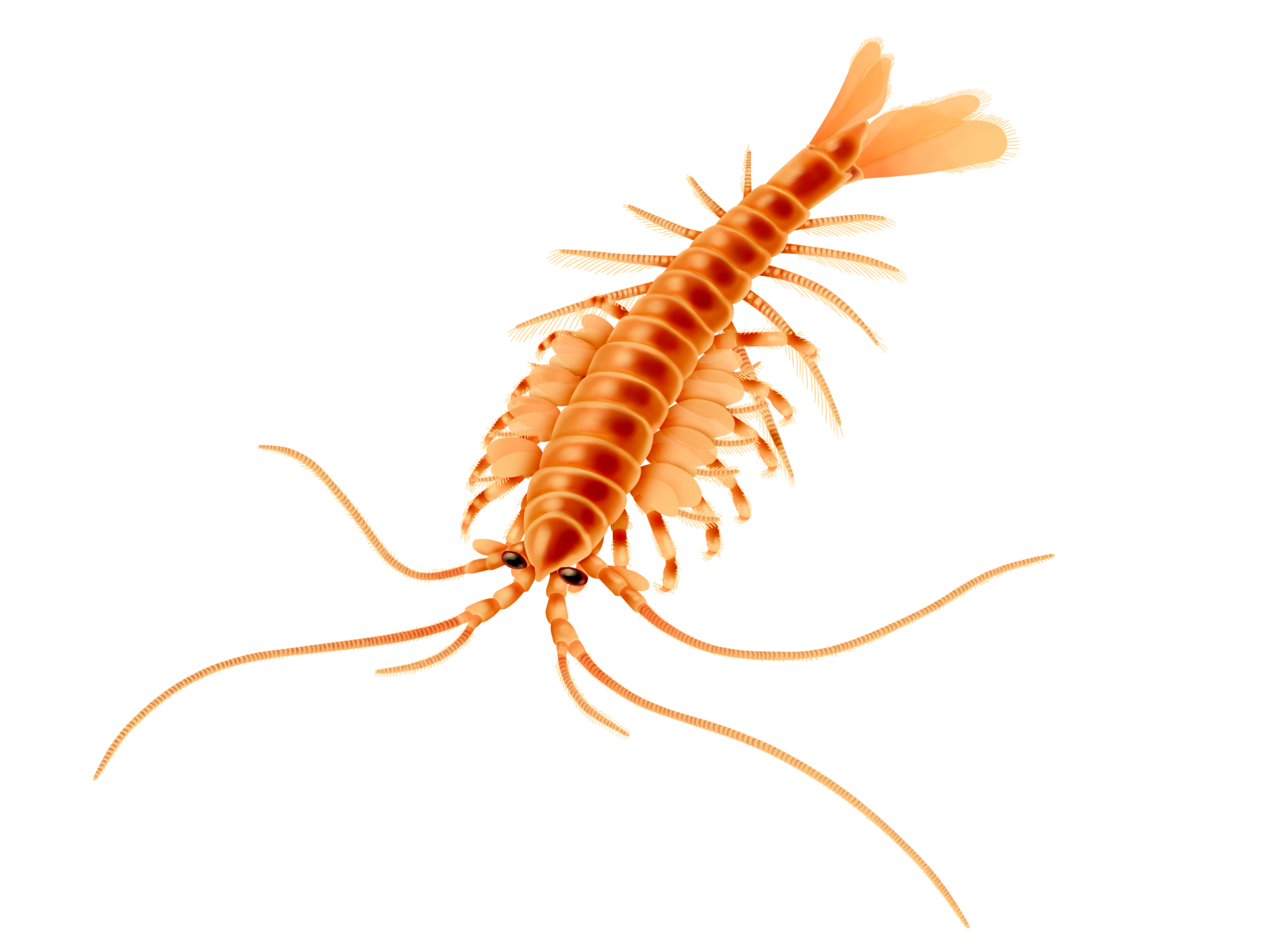
- Life restoration, missing elements reconstructed after modern anaspidesids

Scientific classification
- Kingdom: Animalia
- Phylum: Arthropoda
- Clade: Pancrustacea
- Class: Malacostraca
- Order: Anaspidacea
- Family: Anaspidesidae
- Genus: Koonaspides; Jell & Duncan, 1986

Type species
- Koonaspides indistinctus Jell & Duncan, 1986

= Koonaspides =

Koonaspides Temporal range: Aptian

Extinct genus of crustacean

Koonaspides is an extinct genus of fossil crustacean in the family Anaspidesidae, from Early Cretaceous (Aptian) Koonwarra Fossil Bed in eastern Victoria, Australia. The only known species within the genus is Koonaspides indistinctus. Along with the Triassic genus Anaspidites, this is one of two known fossil members of this family.

== Discovery and etymology ==
A single specimen of K. indistinctus, NMV P102799 is known from the Koonwarra Fossil Beds. The genus name consists of Koon- from Koonwarra and -aspides from Greek aspis, a shield. The species name indistinctus means obscure or dim.

== Description ==
The only known specimen of K. indistinctus has a body length of 23 mm (0.91 in), with indistinct antennae preserved as long as 11 mm (0.43 in). Its eyes are large and very widely separated with eye stalks. Head and anterior part of thorax are indistinct, three posterior tergites could be recognized, but those are shorter and apparently much less sclerotized than abdominal ones. Although very indistinct, long and slender thoracic appendages are confirmed, some reaching around half length of thorax. The abdomen has six segments, with the five anterior ones of almost equal length, with ventral tip of tergites bluntly pointed. The sixth segment is narrower and longer than other five, and the telson is almost as long. The telson has scalloped lateral margins and distinct border furrows on each side. Endopodites are visible on abdominal tergites, being compressed similar to that of Anaspides. The sixth abdominal segment bears large uropods which have hairy margin.

Preserved tergites are penetrated by many circular holes, destroying details of the cuticle. This may be because of escaping gases from compaction of body, or sediment rupturing the cuticle. Preservation also suggests that cuticle is extremely thin.

== Classification ==
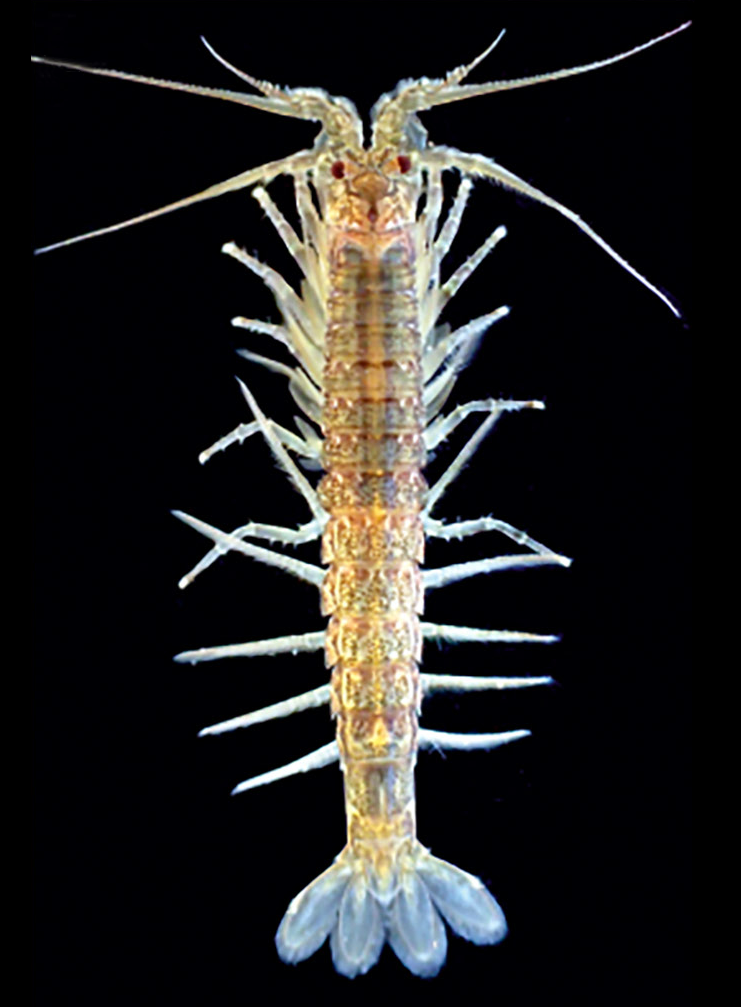
Anaspides driesseni, modern member of family Anaspidesidae

The lack of a carapace and morphology of abdominal segment suggests that Koonaspides is a member of Syncarida, with its stalked eyes, pleopod morphology and general morphological similarities with Anaspidites suggesting that it is a member of Anaspidesidae, the family previously called as Anaspididae. Modern anaspidesids are endemic to Tasmania, which suggests the current distribution of that family represents a relict endemism, originated from earlier members like Triassic Anaspidites. Koonaspides and Anaspidites possibly show that this group lived in southeastern Australia for at least 200 million years.

== Paleoecology ==
Koonaspides is known from Aptian Koonwarra Fossil Bed in Victoria, which represents a freshwater lacustrine environment in the polar regions of Gondwana. Some algae microfossils and many plant macrofossils are known, insects of many groups including the stem-flea Tarwinia, other arthropods like freshwater xiphosuran Victalimulus, and other fauna including fish are known from this fossil site. Other crustaceans known from Koonwarra are conchostracan Cyzicus (Lioestheria) banchocarus and anostracan Koonwarrella, as well as ostracods.
