= Koonwarra Fossil Bed =

- Stratigraphic range: Early Cretaceous (Aptian–Albian); ~114.1–110 Ma
- Type: Fossil site
- Unit of: Strzelecki Group
- Thickness: 7 metres (23 ft) (Fossiliferous mudstone layer)

Lithology
- Primary: Arkose, mudstone
- Other: Clay, siltstone

Location
- Coordinates: 38.5625527°S 145.9598756°E
- Region: Victoria
- Country: Australia

Type section
- Named for: Koonwarra, Victoria
- Koonwarra Fossil Bed (Australia) Koonwarra Fossil Bed (Victoria)

The Koonwarra Fossil Bed is a Konservat Lagerstätte fossil site, which dates to the mid Aptian of the Early Cretaceous period, between 114.1 and 110 million years ago. Located near and named after Koonwarra, Victoria in Australia, the site is known for its fish, invertebrate and plant remains.

== Discovery and excavations ==
The site was discovered in 1961 when the Victorian Country Roads Board approved a proposal to improve a section of the South Gippsland Highway, a few kilometres east of Koonwarra, Victoria. During the work, road workers discovered fossil fish in road cuttings. Between 1962 and 1981, several excavations were carried out at the locality, which became known as the Koonwarra Fossil Bed. These expeditions resulted in the recovery of large quantities of fish, plants and invertebrates, along with feathers, some of which have been described. Excavations have occurred much less often since 1981, despite the abundance of fossil material.

== Deposition & lithology ==
The Koonwarra Fossil Bed is a stratigraphic succession, comprising of an upper arkose layer, about 34.5 metres (113 ft), a fossiliferous mudstone sequence approximately 7 metres (23 ft), and the lower 11.5 metres (38 ft) of arkose. Within the mudstone strata, clay layers alternate with claystone/siltstone layers, understood as an accumulation of varved sediments within a cold-water lake that experienced seasonal periods of anoxia due to ice formation and thawing. This is supported by Frakes & Francis (1988), based on the occurrence of outsized exotic blocks of glacial origin, found in rocks of a similar age in Central Australia. In 1986, Drinnan & Chambers noted that the fossiliferous layers comprised "8 m (26 ft) of fine-grained mudstone interbedded between two fluvial arkosic sandstones. The mudstones consist of graded laminae of various thicknesses composed of alternate layers of claystone and siltstone and strike 230‒235° with a dip of 35‒40° S".

== Paleobiota ==
Color key
Taxon	Reclassified taxon	Taxon falsely reported as present	Dubious taxon or junior synonym	Ichnotaxon	Ootaxon	Morphotaxon

Notes
Uncertain or tentative taxa are in small text; ~~crossed out~~ taxa are discredited.

=== Fishes ===
Fishes of the Koonwarra Fossil Bed
Genus	Species	Clade	Image	Notes
Ceratodus	C. sp.	Ceratodontiformes, Ceratodontidae		Later argued to be an indeterminate lungfish^{supplemental material}
Cacatualepis	C. woodwardi	Chondrostei, Coccolepidae		
Koonwarria	K. manifrons	Teleostei, Koonwarriidae		
Wadeichthys	W. oxyops	Teleostei, Archaeomaenidae	Reconstruction of W. oxyops (top) and K. manifrons (bottom).	
Waldmanichthys	W. koonwarri	Leptolepiformes, Leptolepididae		

=== Tetrapoda ===
Tetrapods of the Koonwarra Fossil Bed
Genus	Species	Clade	Image	Notes
Paraves^{supplemental material}	sp. indet.			Known from several feathers including apparent flight feathers of birds as well as body feathers.

=== Crustaceans ===
Crustaceans of the Koonwarra Fossil Bed
Genus	Species	Clade	Image
Ceriodaphnia	C. sp.	Anomopoda, Daphniidae	
?Diplostraca indet.	sp. indet.	?Diplostraca, incertae sedis	
Simocephalus^{supplemental material}	sp. indet.	Anomopoda, Daphniidae	
Koonwarrella	K. sp.	Anostraca, Thamnocephalidae	
Koonaspides	K. indistinctus	Anaspidacea, Anaspidesidae	Reconstruction of K. indistinctus.
Cypridoidea^{supplemental material}	sp. indet.	Ostracoda, Cypridoidea	

=== Chelicerata ===
Cheliceratans of the Koonwarra Fossil Bed				
Genus	Species	Clade	Image	Notes
Victalimulus	V. mcqueeni	Xiphosura, Limulidae	Slab and counterslab of V. mcqueeni.	
Araneae^{supplemental material}	sp. indet.	Arachnida, Araneae		Two specimens
Opiliones^{supplemental material}	sp. indet.	Arachnida, Opiliones		One specimen

=== Insecta ===
Insects of the Koonwarra Fossil Bed
Genus	Species	Clade	Image	Notes
Aphidulum?	?A. sp.	Hemiptera, Psyllomorpha, Protopsyllidiidae		Known from a single wing. Placement in the genus tentative.
Australochorista	A. leongatha (Formerlly Prochorista leongatha)	Mecoptera, Australochoristidae		
Australurus	A. plexus	Ephemeroptera, Siphlonuridae		
Austroscarites (Formerly Scarites femoratus)	A. femoratus	Hemiptera, Cicadellidae		
Atherimorpha	A. festuca	Diptera, Rhagionidae		
Chauliognathus	C. koonwarra	Coleoptera, Cantharidae		
"Chironomaptera"	"C." collessi	Diptera, Chaoboridae		Placement in Chironomaptera (otherwise known from Asia) has been doubted.
Cretacochorista	C. parva	Mecoptera, Orthophlebiidae		
Cretacoformica	E. explicata	Hymenoptera Cretacoformicidae		
Cretoxenus	C. australis	Coleoptera, Hydrophilidae		
Choristopanorpa	C. drinnani	Mecoptera, Orthophlebiidae		
Dulcimanna	D. sculptor	Ephemeroptera, Siphlonuridae		
Duncanovelia	D. extensa	Hemiptera, incertae sedis		Originally assigned to Mesoveliidae, though some later authors have suggested that it is too poorly preserved to confidently place beyond Hemiptera
Eodinotoperla	E. duncanae	Plecoptera, aff. Notonemouridae		
Eoichneumon^{supplemental material}	E. duncanae	Hymenoptera, Braconidae		
Homopterulum	H. jelli	Hemiptera, Jascopidae		
Koonwarrabaetisca	K. duncani	Ephemeroptera, Baetiscidae		
Koonwarrabaetisca	K. jelli	Ephemeroptera, Baetiscidae		
Koonwarraphis	K. rotundafrons	Hemiptera, Aphidomorpha, Tajmyraphidoidea incertae sedis		
Koonwarrus	K. katya	Hymenoptera, Proctotrupomorpha incertae sedis		
Leptoconops	sp. indet.	Diptera, Ceratopogonidae		Originally recorded as "Simuliid indet. 2"
Ligavena	L. gracilipes	Hemiptera, Ligavenidae		
Nannochorista^{supplemental material}	sp. indet.	Mecoptera, Nannochoristidae		
Neoparachorista^{supplemental material}	N. clarkae	Mecoptera, Parachoristidae		
Nirwata	N. elongata	Odonata, Anisoptera, Libelluloidea		Known from juvenile (naiad) material
Oecetis^{supplemental material}	sp. indet.	Trichoptera, Leptoceridae		
Peraphlebia	P. tetrastichia	Odonata, Epiprocta?		Known from a poorly preserved adult, too poorly preserved to classify, but probably has closer affinities with dragonflies than damselflies.
Promirara	P. cephalota	Ephemeroptera, incertae sedis		Known from nymphs only.
"Pseudalysiinia"	"P." fragmenta	Diptera, Nematocera		Originally described as a member of the extinct family Mesosciophilidae, but later authors have doubted both the family and genus placement, suggesting that it belongs in the living fungus gnat family Mycetophilidae and be placed in a new genus.
Synneuron	S. jelli	Diptera, Canthyloscelidae		
Tarwinia	T. australis	Siphonaptera, Tarwiniidae	Fossil of T. australis.	
Undacypha	U. una	Thysanoptera, Lophioneurida		
Westratia^{supplemental material}	W. nana	Hymenoptera, Praeaulacidae		
Orthophlebiidae indet.	sp. indet.	Mecoptera, Orthophlebiidae		
Siphlonuridae indet.	sp. indet.	Ephemeroptera, Siphlonuridae		
Scirtidae	sp. indet.	Coleoptera, Scirtidae		
Stenopelmatoidea	sp. indet.	Orthophlebiidae, Ensifera		Known from a single adult
Tridactylidae	sp. indet.	Orthophlebiidae, Caelifera		Known from a nymph
Limoniidae^{supplemental material}	sp. indet.	Diptera		
Dixidae^{supplemental material}	sp. indet.	Diptera		
Simuliidae^{supplemental material}	sp. indet.			
Blattulidae(originally assigned to living genus Methana)	sp. indet.	Dictyoptera, Blattodea		Adult remains
Tanypodinae	sp. indet.	Diptera, Chironomidae		
Tipulidae?	sp. indet.	Diptera		
Mesoblattinidae?	sp. indet.	Dictyoptera, Blattodea		Known from nymphs. Otherwise considered indeterminate cockroach remains
Zygoptera	sp. indet.	Zygoptera, incertae sedis		Known from juvenile (naiad) material, possibly representing members of Calopterygoidea
Veliidae	sp. indet.	Hemiptera, Gerromorpha		
Calamoceratidae^{supplemental material}	sp. indet.	Trichoptera		
Proctotrupidae^{supplemental material}	sp. indet.	Hymenoptera, Apocrita		
Monomachidae^{supplemental material}	sp. indet.	Hymenoptera, Apocrita		Two specimens, one originally erroneously assigned to Westratia nana
Mordellidae^{supplemental material}	sp. indet.	Coleoptera, Polyphaga		
Dytiscidae^{supplemental material}	sp. indet.	Coleoptera, Adephaga		
Gyrinidae?^{supplemental material}	sp. indet.	Coleoptera, Adephaga		
Hydraenidae^{supplemental material}	sp. indet.	Coleoptera, Polyphaga		
Staphylinidae^{supplemental material}	sp. indet.	Coleoptera, Polyphaga		

=== Annelida ===
Molluscs of the Koonwarra Fossil Bed
Genus	Species	Clade	Image	Notes
Oligochaete^{supplemental material}	sp. indet.	Annelida, Oligochaeta		Three specimens

=== Mollusca ===
Molluscs of the Koonwarra Fossil Bed
Genus	Species	Clade	Image	Notes
Unionoidea^{supplemental material}	sp. indet.	Bivalvia, Unionoidea		

=== Flora ===
Flora of the Koonwarra Fossil Bed
Genus	Species	Clade	Image
Brachyphyllum	B. gippslandicum	Araucariales, Podocarpaceae	
Cladophlebis	C. biformis	Osmundales, Osmundaceae	
Clavatipollenites	C. hughesii	Angiosperm pollen	
Dendroceros	D. victoriensis	Dendrocerotales, Dendrocerotaceae	
Ginkgo	G. australis	Ginkgoales, Ginkgoaceae	
Leongathia	L. elegans	Ephedrales, Ephedraceae	
Phyllotheca	P. wonthaggiensis	Equisetales, Phyllothecaceae	
Riccardia	R. koonwarriensis	Metzgeriales, Aneuraceae	
Sphenopteris	S. warragulensis	Lyginopteridales, Lyginopteridaceae	
Taeniopteris	T. daintreei	Tracheophytes, incertae sedis	
Thinfeldia	T. sp.	Peltaspermales, Peltaspermaceae	
Angiospermae	sp. indet.	Angiospermae, incertae sedis	
Araucariaceae	sp. indet.	Araucariales, Araucariaceae	
