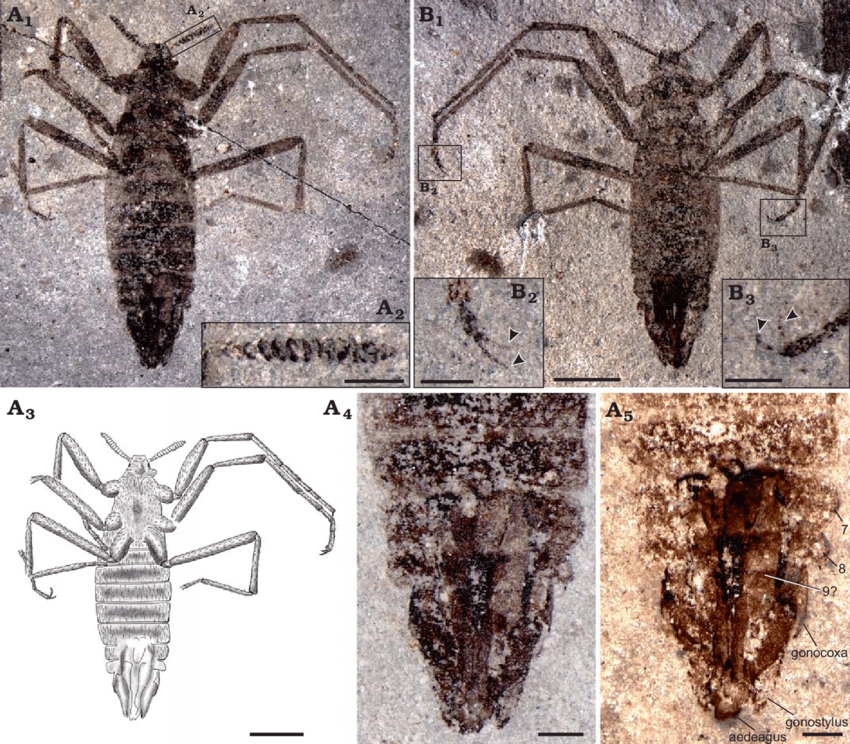
- Saurophthirus laevigatus

Scientific classification
- Kingdom: Animalia
- Phylum: Arthropoda
- Class: Insecta
- Order: Siphonaptera
- Family: †Saurophthiridae; Ponomarenko, 1986
- Genus: †Saurophthirus; Ponomarenko, 1976

Type species
- Saurophthirus longipes Ponomarenko, 1976

Other species
- S. exquisitus Gao, Shih, Rasnitsyn, and Ren, 2013; S. laevigatus Zhang, Shih, Rasnitsyn, and Gao, 2020

= Saurophthirus =

Saurophthirus Temporal range: Early Cretaceous

Extinct genus of fleas

Saurophthirus is an extinct genus of giant stem-group flea, and the only member of the family Saurophthiridae. The type species, S. longipes is found in early Cretaceous strata of Baissa, Siberia. Two other species S. exquisitus and S. laevigatus are from the Lower Cretaceous Yixian Formation of China.

== Description ==
Body length of largest species, S. longipes is 12 mm (0.47 in) long. They are generally seen as transitional between more primitive stem-fleas such as Pseudopulicidae and Tarwinia and modern fleas.
