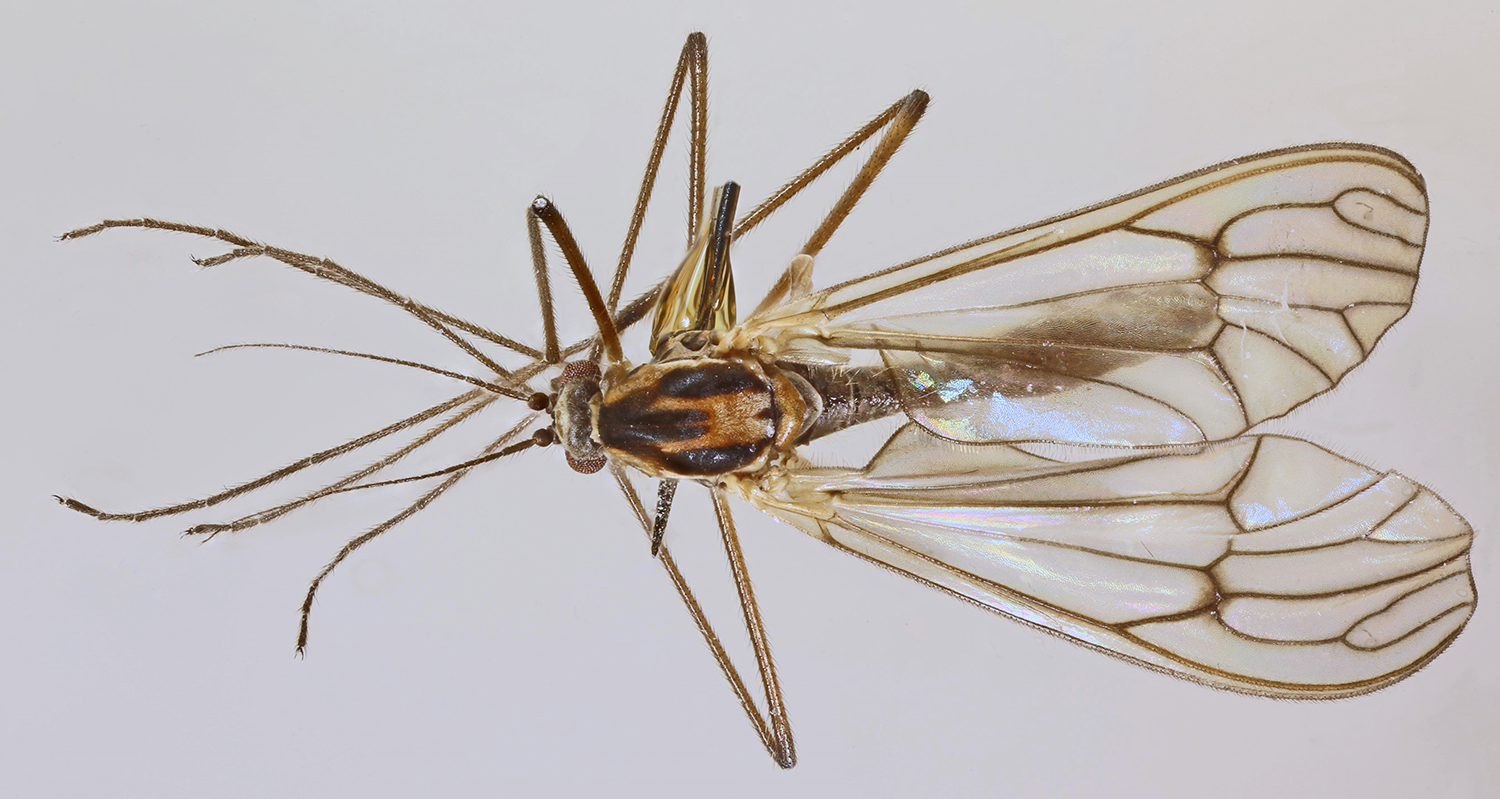
- Dixa dilatata North Wales

Scientific classification
- Kingdom: Animalia
- Phylum: Arthropoda
- Class: Insecta
- Order: Diptera
- Family: Dixidae
- Genus: Dixa
- Species: D. dilatata

Binomial name
- Dixa dilatata Strobl, 1900

= Dixa dilatata =

Species of fly

Dixa dilatata is a species of fly in the family Dixidae. It is found in the Palearctic.
