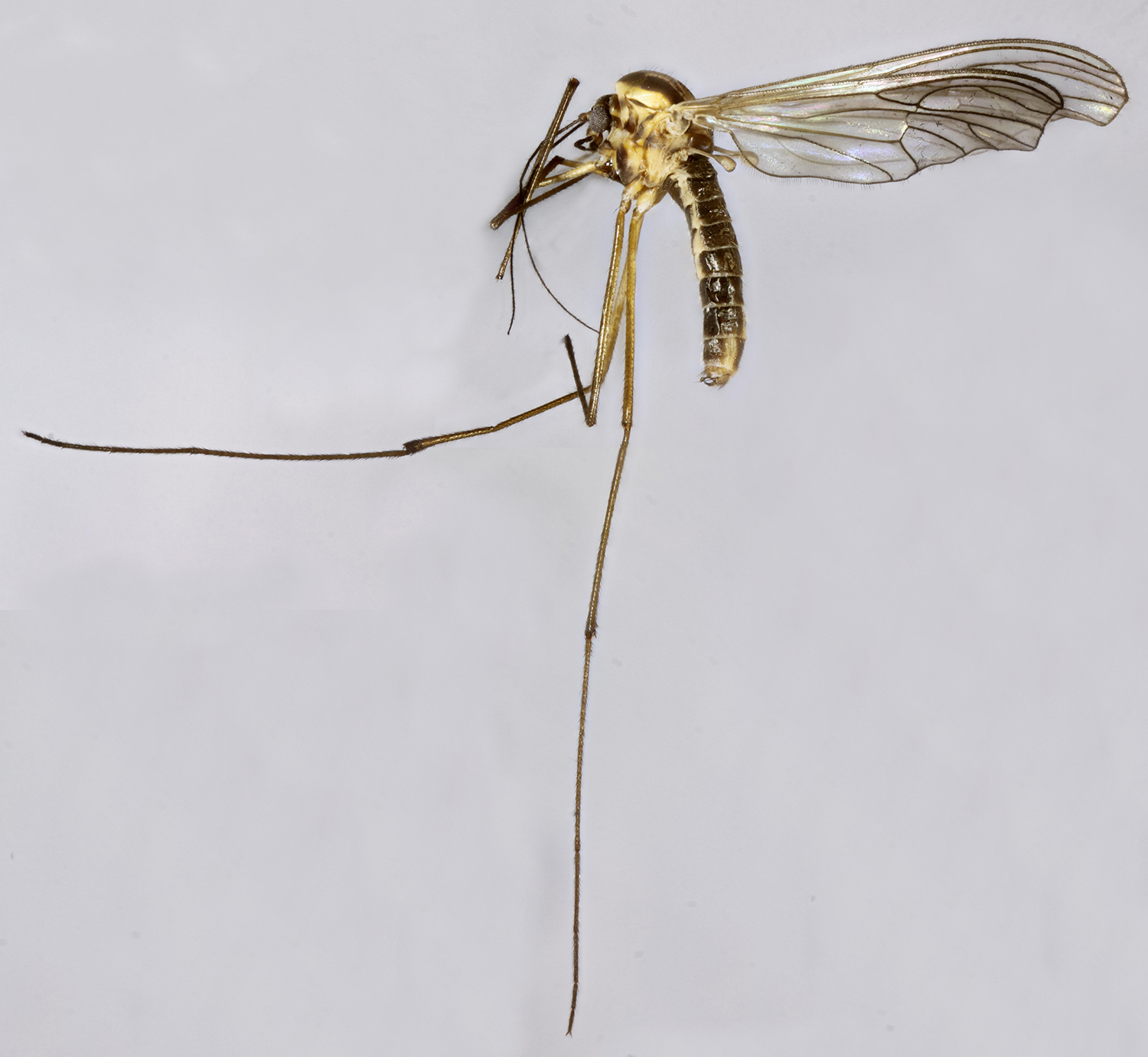
- Dixella martinii North Wales

Scientific classification
- Kingdom: Animalia
- Phylum: Arthropoda
- Class: Insecta
- Order: Diptera
- Family: Dixidae
- Genus: Dixella
- Species: D. martinii

Binomial name
- Dixella martinii (Peus, 1934)

= Dixella martinii =

Species of fly

Dixella martinii is a species of fly in the family Dixidae. It is found in the Palearctic.
