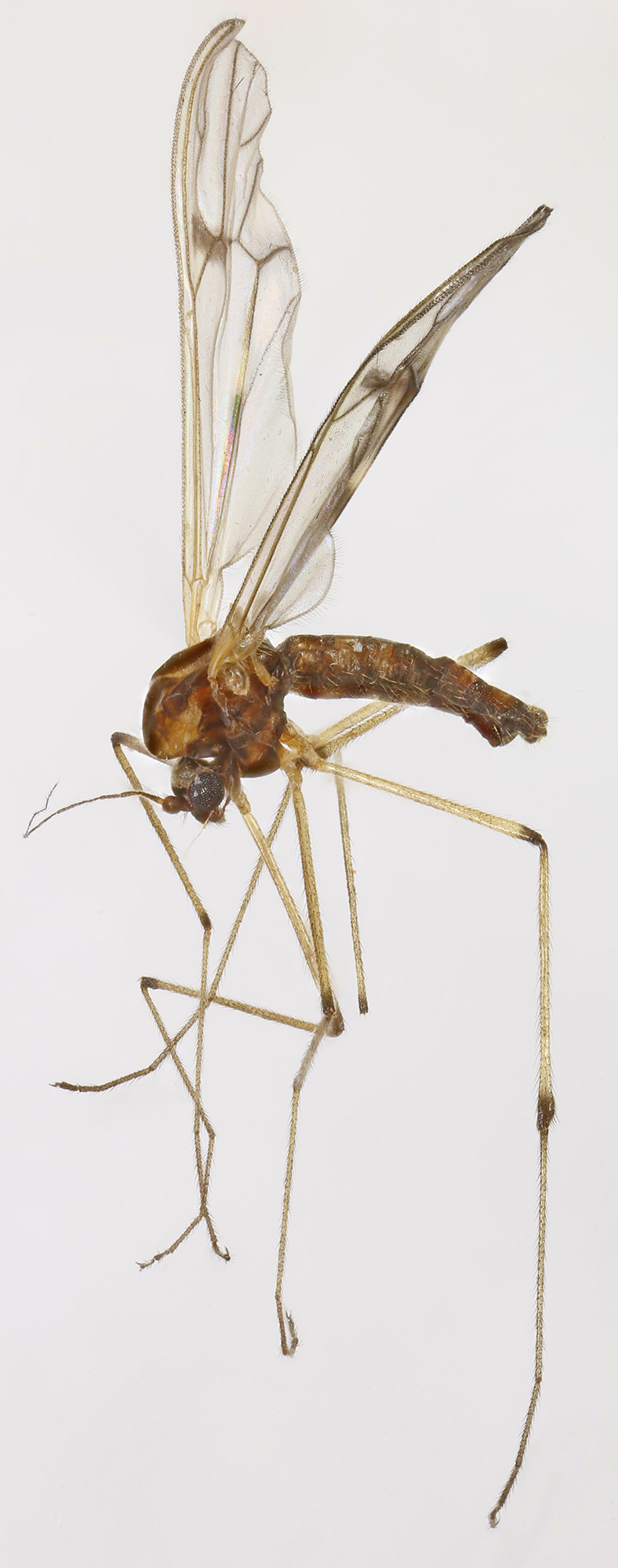
- Dixa nubilipennis North Wales

Scientific classification
- Kingdom: Animalia
- Phylum: Arthropoda
- Class: Insecta
- Order: Diptera
- Family: Dixidae
- Genus: Dixa
- Species: D. nubilipennis

Binomial name
- Dixa nubilipennis Curtis, 1832

= Dixa nubilipennis =

Species of fly

Dixa nubilipennis is a species of fly in the family Dixidae. It is found in the Palearctic.
