= Dixella nova =

Scientific classification
- Domain: Eukaryota
- Kingdom: Animalia
- Phylum: Arthropoda
- Class: Insecta
- Order: Diptera
- Family: Dixidae
- Genus: Dixella
- Species: D. nova

Binomial name
- Dixella nova Walker, 1948

Synonyms
- Dixa nocheles Dyar and Shannon, 1924; Dixa occidentalis Garrett, 1924

Species of fly

Dixella nova is a species of meniscus midges in the family Dixidae.
