= Cleopsylla =

Scientific classification
- Kingdom: Animalia
- Phylum: Arthropoda
- Class: Insecta
- Order: Siphonaptera
- Family: Stephanocircidae
- Genus: Cleopsylla; Rothschild, 1914

Species
- C. barquezi; C. monticola; C. townsendi; C. vidua

Genus of fleas

Cleopsylla is a genus name for a group of parasites of the family Stephanocircidae which means "helmet fleas". This genera of parasites can be found in parts of Australia and South America.

== Species ==
- C. barquezi López Berrizbeitia, Hastriter, and Díaz, 2016 – described from sigmodontine rodents in northwestern Argentina
- C. monticola Smit, 1953
- C. townsendi Rothschild, 1914
- C. vidua Beaucournu & Gallardo, 1991

== Description ==
The head has a convex area with combs and spines on it. The thorax of these species of Cleopsylla have different rows of setae.

== Favorable environmental conditions ==
These parasites do well in moist and humid environments.
