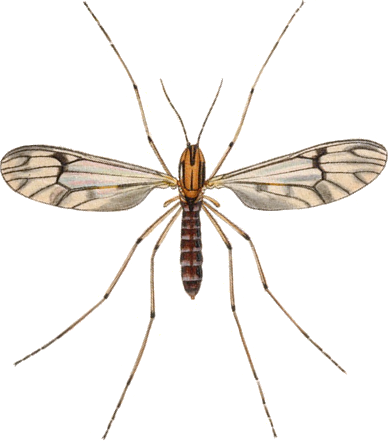
- Adult of Dixa nebulosa

Scientific classification
- Domain: Eukaryota
- Kingdom: Animalia
- Phylum: Arthropoda
- Class: Insecta
- Order: Diptera
- Family: Dixidae
- Genus: Dixa; Meigen, 1818

Synonyms
- Palaeodixa Contini, 1965; Paradixa

= Dixa =

Genus of flies

Dixa is a genus of midges, belonging to the family Dixidae.

The genus was described in 1818 by Johann Wilhelm Meigen.

The genus has cosmopolitan distribution.

Species include:

- Dixa dilatata
- Dixa nebulosa
- Dixa nubilipennis
