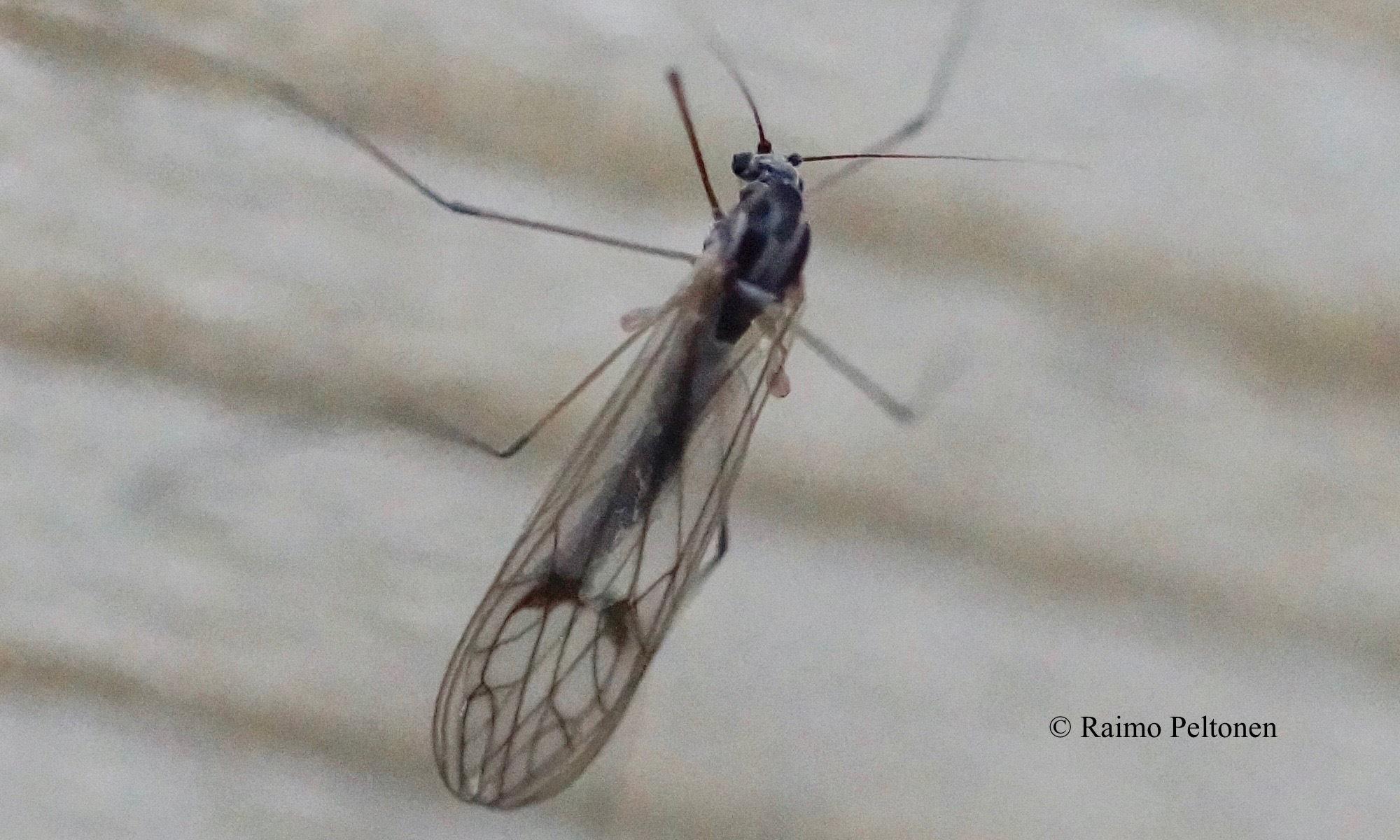
- Dixella borealis

Scientific classification
- Kingdom: Animalia
- Phylum: Arthropoda
- Class: Insecta
- Order: Diptera
- Family: Dixidae
- Genus: Dixella; Dyar & Shannon, 1924

= Dixella =

Genus of flies

Dixella is a genus of meniscus midges in the family Dixidae. There are more than 70 described species in Dixella.

== Species ==
These 73 species belong to the genus Dixella:

- Dixella aegyptiaca Wagner, Freidberg & Ortal, 1992
- Dixella aestivalis (Meigen, 1818)
- Dixella alexanderi Peters, 1970
- Dixella amphibia (De Geer, 1776)
- Dixella andeana (Lane, 1942)
- Dixella argentina (Alexander, 1920)
- Dixella atra (Lane, 1942)
- Dixella attica (Pandazis, 1933)
- Dixella aurora Peters & Cook, 1966
- Dixella autumnalis (Meigen, 1838)
- Dixella bankowskae (Vaillant, 1969)
- Dixella californica Johannsen, 1923
- Dixella campinosica (Tarwid, 1938)
- Dixella chapadensis (Lane, 1939)
- Dixella clavulus (Williston, 1896)
- Dixella cornuta Johannsen, 1923
- Dixella cumbrica Peters & Cook, 1966
- Dixella curvistylus Greenwalt & Moulton, 2016
- Dixella deltoura Peters & Cook, 1966
- Dixella dorsalis
- Dixella eomarginata Greenwalt & Moulton, 2016
- Dixella fernandezae Chaverri & Borkent, 2007
- Dixella filicornis (Edwards, 1926)
- Dixella fuscinervis (Tonnoir, 1924)
- Dixella goetghebueri (Seguy, 1921)
- Dixella golanensis Wagner, Freidberg & Ortal, 1992
- Dixella graeca (Pandazis, 1937)
- Dixella hansoni Chaverri & Borkent, 2007
- Dixella harrisi (Tonnoir, 1925)
- Dixella harrisoni (Freeman, 1956)
- Dixella hernandezi Chaverri & Borkent, 2007
- Dixella horrmani (Lane, 1942)
- Dixella humeralis (Tonnoir, 1923)
- Dixella hyperborea (Bergroth, 1889)
- Dixella intacta Greenwalt & Moulton, 2016
- Dixella israelis Wagner, Freidberg & Ortal, 1992
- Dixella jironi Chaverri & Borkent, 2007
- Dixella laeta (Loew, 1849)
- Dixella limai (Santos, 1940)
- Dixella lirio (Dyar & Shannon, 1924)
- Dixella lobata Chaverri & Borkent, 2007
- Dixella maculata Chaverri & Borkent, 2007
- Dixella marginata (Loew, 1863)
- Dixella martinii (Peus, 1934)
- Dixella monticola (Nielsen, 1937)
- Dixella neozelandica (Tonnoir, 1924)
- Dixella nicholsoni (Tonnoir, 1923)
- Dixella nigra (Staeger, 1840)
- Dixella nixiae Peters, 1980
- Dixella nova Walker, 1948
- Dixella obscura (Loew, 1849)
- Dixella paulistana (Lane, Forattini & Rabello, 1955)
- Dixella peruviana (Edwards, 1931)
- Dixella pilosiflagellata Papp, 2007
- Dixella scitula Belkin & al.
- Dixella serotina (Meigen, 1818)
- Dixella shannoni (Lane, 1942)
- Dixella simiarum (Vaillant, 1959)
- Dixella solomonis Belkin, 1962
- Dixella spinilobata Greenwalt & Moulton, 2016
- Dixella subobscura (Takahashi, 1958)
- Dixella suzukii Chaverri & Borkent, 2007
- Dixella tasmaniensis (Tonnoir, 1923)
- Dixella techana Peters & Cook, 1966
- Dixella tonnoiri (Belkin, 1968)
- Dixella torrentia Lane, 1939
- Dixella trinitensis Lane, 1943
- Dixella unipunctata (Tonnoir, 1923)
- Dixella venezuelensis (Lane, 1942)
- Dixella verna (Vaillant, 1969)
- Dixella vespertina Peters & Cook, 1966
- Dixella woodi Chaverri & Borkent, 2007
- Dixella wygodzinskyi (Lane, 1945)
