= Stephanocircidae =

Scientific classification
- Domain: Eukaryota
- Kingdom: Animalia
- Phylum: Arthropoda
- Class: Insecta
- Order: Siphonaptera
- Suborder: Hystrichopsyllomorpha
- Superfamily: Stephanocircidoidea; Wagner, 1928
- Family: Stephanocircidae; Wagner, 1928

Genera
- See text

Family of fleas

Stephanocircidae is a family of fleas native to South America and Australia, where they are found on rodents.

== Genera ==
- Subfamily Craneopsyllinae Wagner, 1939
  - Tribe Barreropsyllini Jordan, 1953
    - Genus Barreropsylla Jordan, 1953
  - Tribe Craneopsyllini Wagner, 1939
    - Genus Cleopsylla Rothschild, 1914
    - Genus Craneopsylla Rothschild, 1911
    - Genus Nonnapsylla Wagner, 1938
    - Genus Plocopsylla Jordan, 1931
    - Genus Sphinctopsylla Jordan, 1931
    - Genus Tiarapsylla Wagner, 1937
- Subfamily Stephanocircinae Wagner, 1928
  - Genus Coronapsylla Traub et Dunnet, 1973
  - Genus Stephanocircus Skuse, 1893
