= Ancistropsylla =

Scientific classification
- Kingdom: Animalia
- Phylum: Arthropoda
- Class: Insecta
- Order: Siphonaptera
- Family: Ancistropsyllidae
- Genus: Ancistropsylla; Toumanoff & Fuller, 1947

Genus of insects

Ancistropsylla is a genus of fleas belonging to the monotypic family Ancistropsyllidae.

Species:

- Ancistropsylla nepalensis Lewis, 1968
- Ancistropsylla roubaudi Toumanoff & Fuller, 1947
- Ancistropsylla siamensis Smit & Toumanoff, 1952
