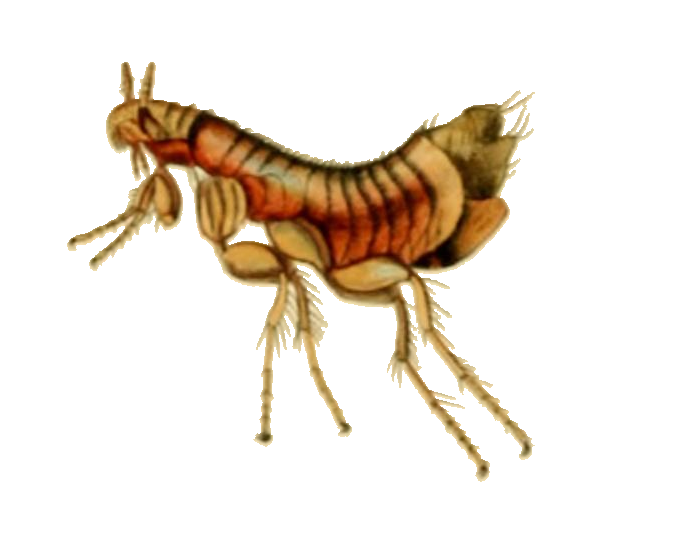
- Ischnopsyllus elongatus

Scientific classification
- Kingdom: Animalia
- Phylum: Arthropoda
- Class: Insecta
- Order: Siphonaptera
- Family: Ischnopsyllidae; Wahlgren, 1907

= Ischnopsyllidae =

Family of fleas

Ischnopsyllidae (Sometimes called a bat flea) is a family of fleas belonging to the order Siphonaptera. They have primarily parasitized bats, and have evolved to live in the fur of various bat species.

== Description ==
An Ischnopsyllidae's body is generally less 5mm, which is laterally compressed to easier move through bat fur.

== Life cycle ==
Eggs are typically laid in a bats roost. The larva then eats organic matter in the roost before developing a cocoon near the roost. After it emerges as an adult, it finds a host to attach to.

== Genera ==
Genera:

- Alectopsylla Mahnert, 1976
- Allopsylla Beaucournu & Fain, 1982
- Araeopsylla Jordan & Rothschild, 1921
- Arixenia
- Chiropteropsylla Oudemans, 1908
- Coorilla Dunnet & Mardon, 1973
- Dampfia Smit, 1954
- Hexactenopsylla Oudemans, 1909
- Hirtopsylla
- Hormopsylla Jordan & Rothschild, 1921
- Ischnopsyllus Westwood, 1833
- Lagaropsylla Jordan & Rothschild, 1921
- Mitchella Lewis, 1970
- Myodopsylla Jordan & Rothschild, 1911
- Nycteridopsylla Oudemans, 1906
- Oxyparius Jordan, 1936
- Porribius Jordan, 1946
- Ptilopsylla Jordan & Rothschild, 1921
- Rhinolophopsylla Oudemans, 1909
- Rothschildopsylla Guimaráes, 1953
- Serendipsylla Smit, 1975
- Sternopsylla Jordan & Rothschild, 1921
- Tanglha Liu, Wu & Wu, 1977
- Thaumapsylla Rothschild, 1907
