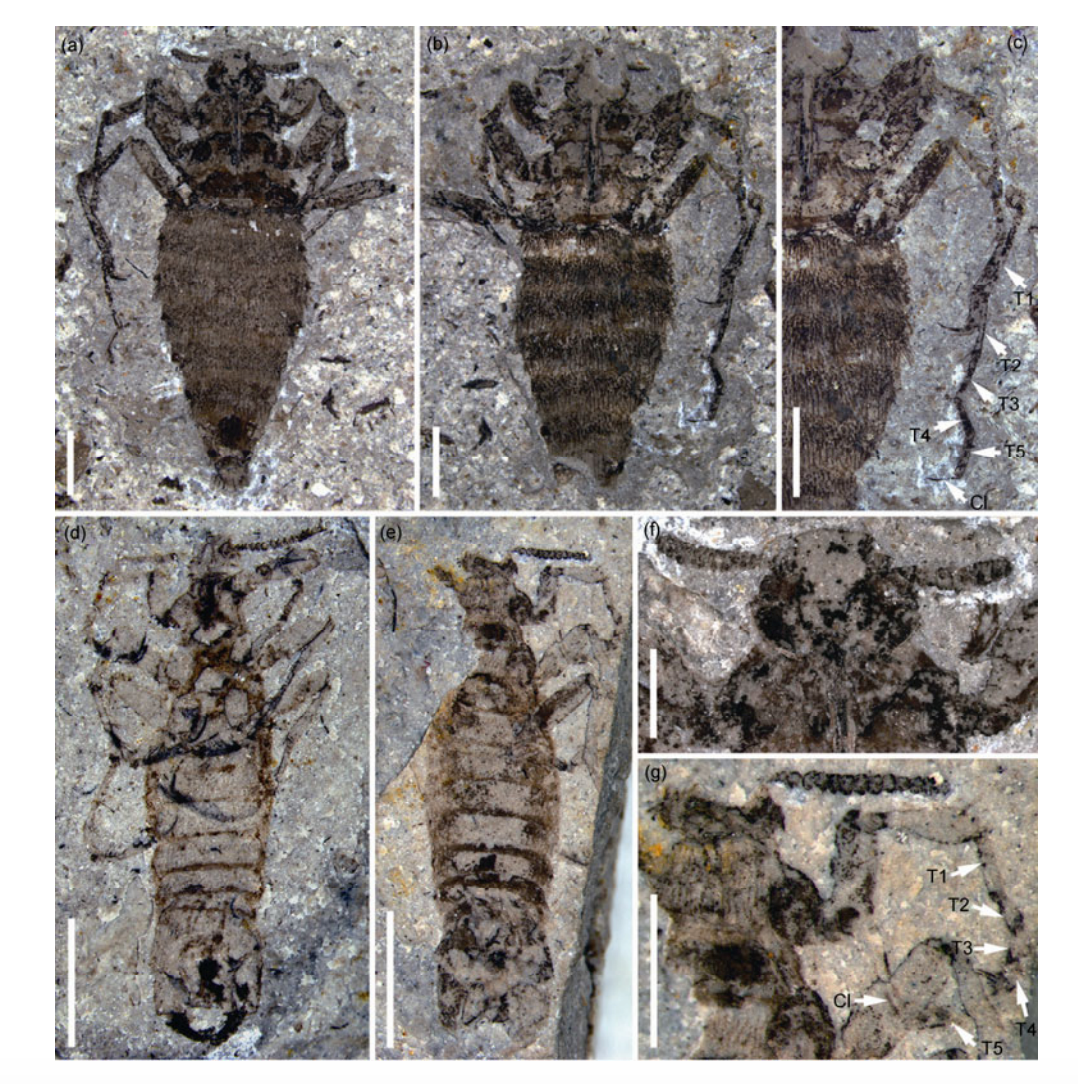
- Pseudopulex wangi fossils

Scientific classification
- Kingdom: Animalia
- Phylum: Arthropoda
- Clade: Pancrustacea
- Class: Insecta
- Order: Siphonaptera
- Family: †Pseudopulicidae
- Genus: †Pseudopulex; Gao, Shih, and Ren, 2012

Species
- P. jurassicus Gao, Shih, and Ren, 2012; P. magnus Gao, Shih, and Ren, 2012; P. tanlan Gao, Shih, Rasnitsyn, and Ren, 2014; P. wangi Huang, Engel, Cai, and Nel, 2013

= Pseudopulex =

Pseudopulex Temporal range: Middle Jurassic to Early Cretaceous, 165–125 Ma

Genus of fleas

Pseudopulex is an extinct genus of primitive fleas that lived between the Middle Jurassic and Early Cretaceous periods in what is now modern-day China. The Latin root for the name Pseudopulex roughly translates to "false fleas". Despite this, they are true fleas (belonging to the order Siphonaptera).

== Discovery ==
There are currently four identified species in this genus: Pseudopulex jurassicus, Pseudopulex magnus, Pseudopulex wangi, and Pseudopulex tanlan. The majority of current research focuses on P. jurassicus and P. magnus.

Fossils of P. jurassicus date back to the middle Jurassic age of the Jiulongshan Formation in China, around 165 million years ago, while P. magnus was discovered from the Early Cretaceous Yixian Formation, around 125 million years ago. Currently, there have been a total of six other flea-like fossils that have been discovered along with this genus.

== Description ==
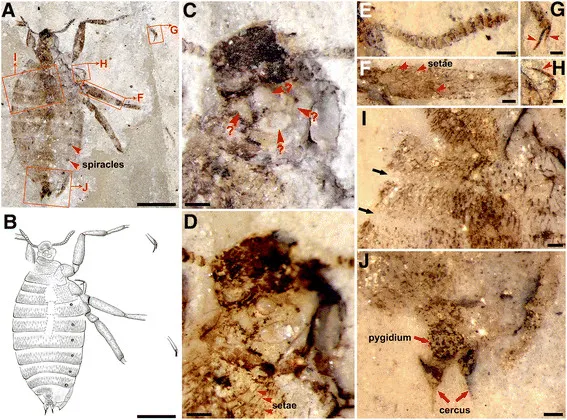
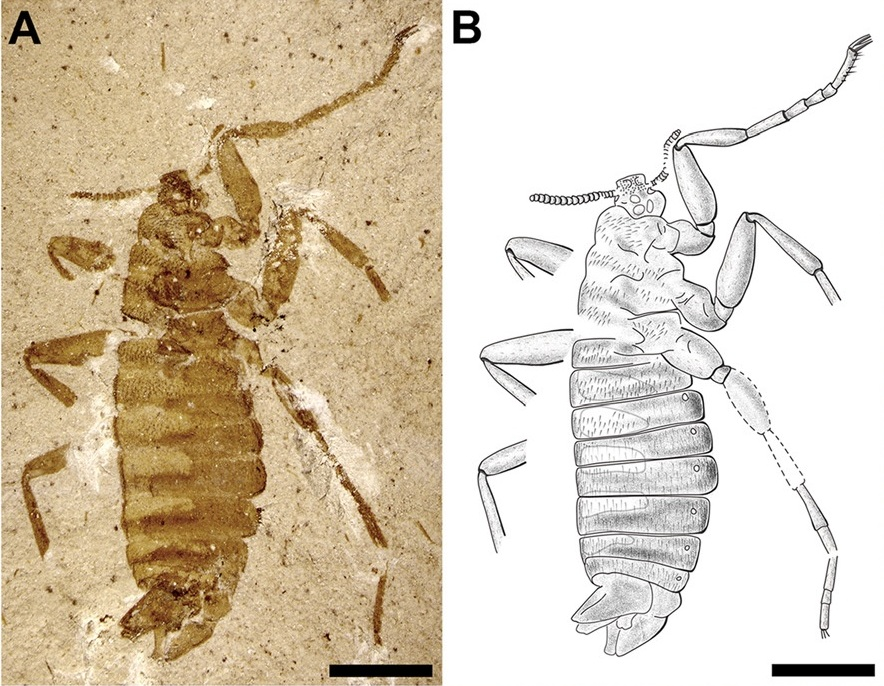
P. tanlan fossils and line drawings

Pseudopulex species have dorsoventrally flattened bodies unlike modern fleas, but similar to common ectoparasites like ticks or bedbugs. They exhibit traits such as thinner, more elongated clawed appendages and extended mouthparts that can distinguish them from similar parasites such as lice. Several traits differentiate them from extant crown group fleas, which may be an indication of this genus possibly having an early evolution that resulted in a dead-end lineage. Their legs were quite long and each ended in a pair of long claws; however, unlike extant fleas, they lacked enlarged saltatorial hind legs.

Several features are used to distinguish the species of Pseudopulex; P. jurassicus was slightly longer and possessed a shorter stylet, while P. magnus was thicker and had very long mouthparts.

P. jurassicus has a body length of 17 millimetres (0.67 in) and a mouthpart length of 3.4 mm, which was twice the size of its head. This species had very small eyes, antennae, and a short torso covered in long thin bristles (setae).

P. magnus was 22.8 millimetres (0.90 in) long with 5.2 mm long mouthparts. Their heads were relatively small, and their bodies were compressed and stout compared to P. jurassicus. This species also exhibited antennae, dense setae, and claws on the ends of their legs, but had a distinctively large abdomen.

P. wangi females were about 14.8 millimetres (0.58 in) long and had small heads, relatively short mouthparts, and short antennae. Males, however, were much smaller and had longer bodies with larger genitalia, indicating P. wangi was more sexually dimorphic than other species in its genus.

P. tanlan was smaller than the other Pseudopulex species at about 10 millimetres (0.39 in) long, with a relatively small head and thoracic cavity. The body of P. tanlan also exhibits very short and stiff setae. Compared to P. magnus and P. jurassicus, P. tanlan has relatively small male genitalia and short tibias in females. P. tanlan is considered to be a transitional organism between P. jurassicus or P. magnus and extant fleas as it has a smaller body plan, more compact antennae, and other features associated with extant fleas.

== Paleobiology ==
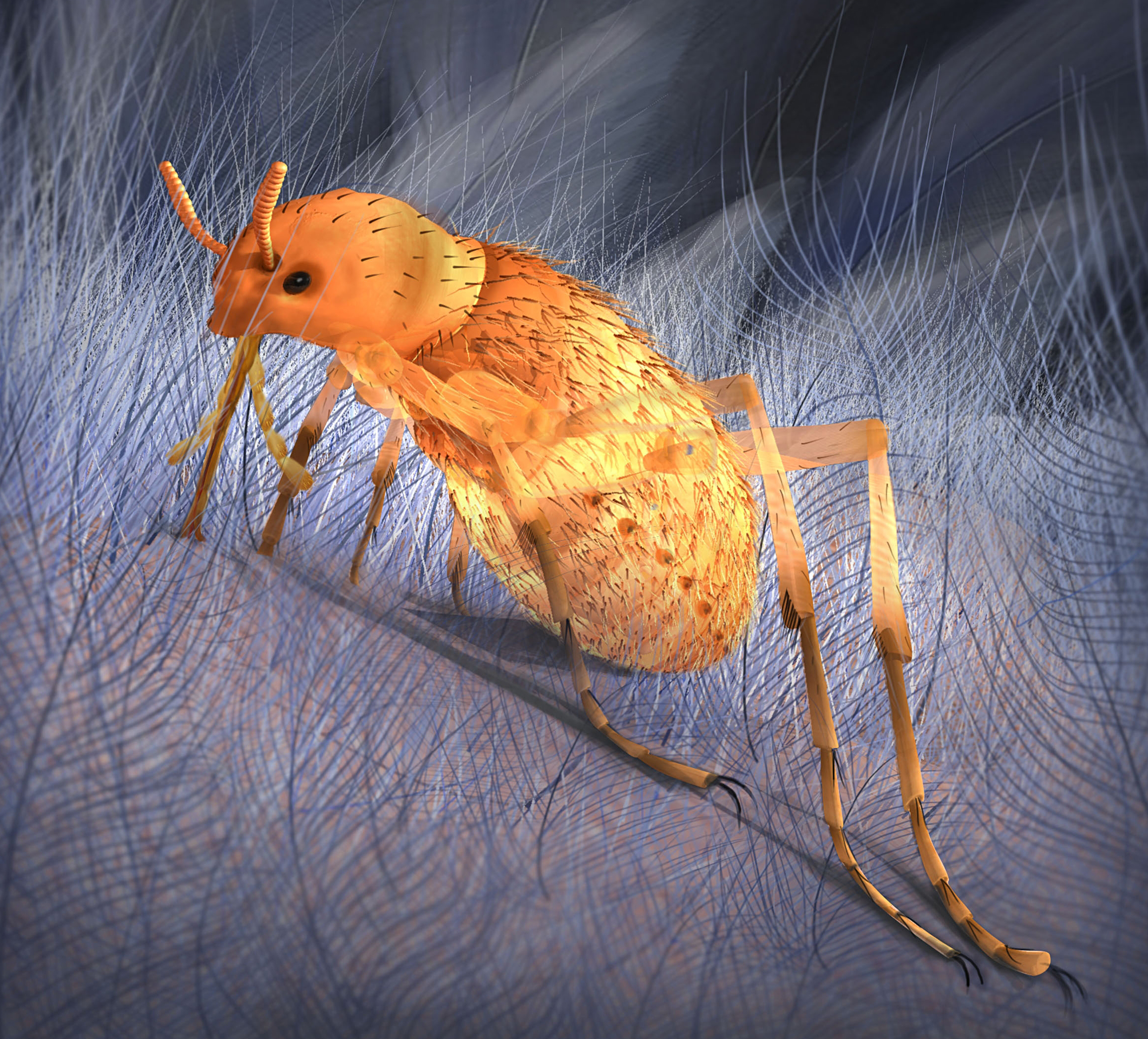
Restoration of P. jurassicus

Despite Pseudopulex having some similar characteristics to modern fleas, major differences in body morphology suggest differences in hosts compared to extant fleas. They possessed serrated stylets, which were likely used for feeding on blood through thick layers of skin, and are estimated to have been about fifty times larger than the dog flea.

Potential hosts for P. jurassicus include Pedopenna daohugouensis or Epidexipteryx hui, while P. magnus may have parasitized Sinosauropteryx prima or Microraptor gui. They may have later adapted to parasitizing smaller birds and mammals, altering their morphology to more closely resemble modern-day fleas.
