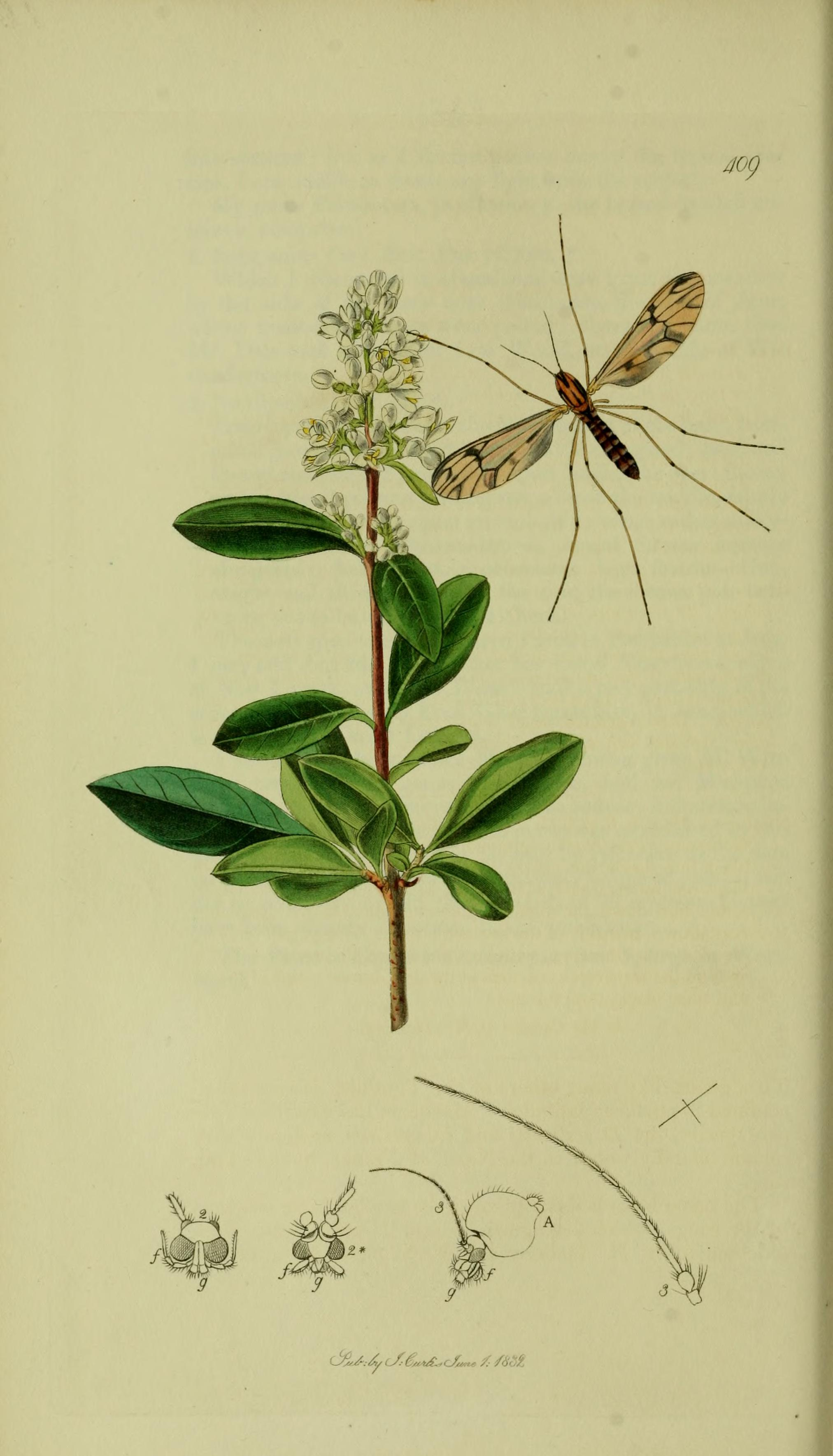

Scientific classification
- Kingdom: Animalia
- Phylum: Arthropoda
- Class: Insecta
- Order: Diptera
- Family: Dixidae
- Genus: Dixa
- Species: D. nebulosa

Binomial name
- Dixa nebulosa (Meigen, 1830)

= Dixa nebulosa =

Species of fly

Dixa nebulosa is a species of fly in the family Dixidae. It is found in the Palearctic.
