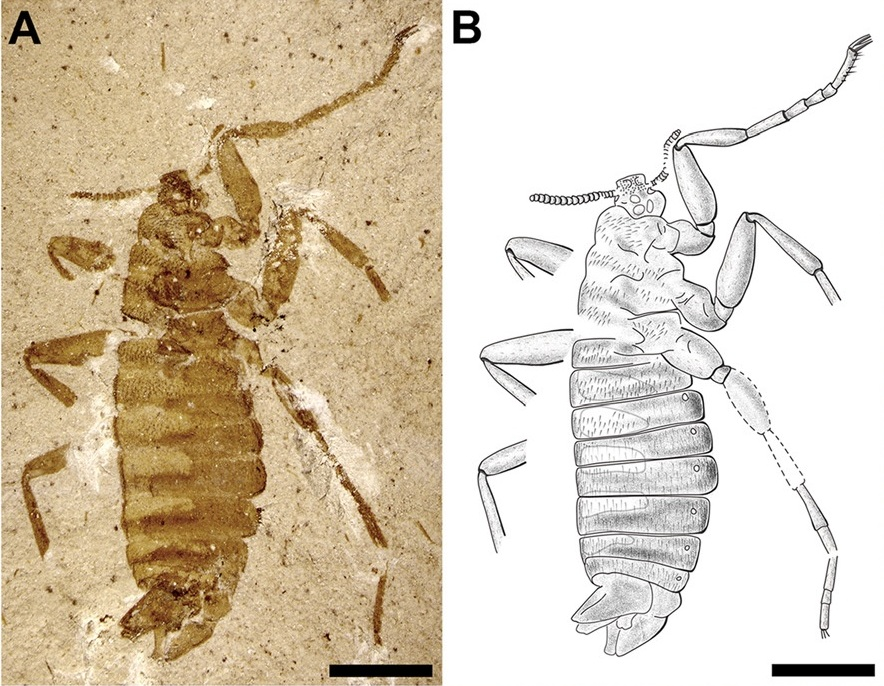
- Pseudopulex tanlan

Scientific classification
- Domain: Eukaryota
- Kingdom: Animalia
- Phylum: Arthropoda
- Class: Insecta
- Order: Siphonaptera
- Family: †Pseudopulicidae; Gao, Shih & Ren, 2012

Genera
- †Pseudopulex; †Hadropsylla; †Tyrannopsylla

= Pseudopulicidae =

Pseudopulicidae Temporal range: Middle Jurassic - Early Cretaceous Bathonian–Aptian

Extinct family of stem-group fleas

Pseudopulicidae is an extinct family of stem-group fleas from the Middle Jurassic to Early Cretaceous of China. They represent the oldest known group of stem-fleas. Like other stem-group "giant fleas", they are much larger and lack the specialised morphology of modern fleas.

== Description ==
Pseudopulicids are much larger than modern fleas, varying from 8 mm to over 2 cm in body length. The females of the species are always larger than the males. The body is flattened, with a non-reduced thorax, and covered in posterior-facing hairs (setae). The antennae are relatively compact, with at least 16 antennomeres and 14-17 flagellomeres. The mouthparts are siphonate, with a piercing-suctorial function, and are serrated and longer in females. The distal (outer) part of the tibia is covered in comb-like ctenidia. The tarsi are elongate, at least as long as the femora and tibiae combined. The male abdominal sternites are sclerotized, and the penis of the males is large and exposed.

== Ecology ==
The hosts of pseudopulicids and other extinct stem-fleas are unknown. Proposed hosts have included primitive mammals, dinosaurs, and pterosaurs.

== Taxonomy ==
- Pseudopulex Gao, Shih, and Ren, 2012
  - P. jurassicus Gao, Shih, and Ren, 2012 Daohugou, China, Middle Jurassic (Bathonian)
  - P. magnus Gao, Shih, and Ren, 2012 Yixian Formation, China, Early Cretaceous (Aptian)
  - P. tanlan Gao, Shih, Rasnitsyn, and Ren, 2014 Yixian Formation, China, Early Cretaceous (Aptian)
  - P. wangi Huang, Engel, Cai, and Nel, 2013 Daohugou, China, Middle Jurassic (Bathonian)
- Tyrannopsylla beipiaoensis Huang, Engel, Cai, and Nel, 2013 Yixian Formation, China, Early Cretaceous (Aptian)
- Hadropsylla sinica Huang, Engel, Cai, and Nel, 2013 Daohugou, China, Middle Jurassic (Bathonian)
