= Song of the Flea =

1879 song by Modest Mussorgsky

- Song by Modest Mussorgsky
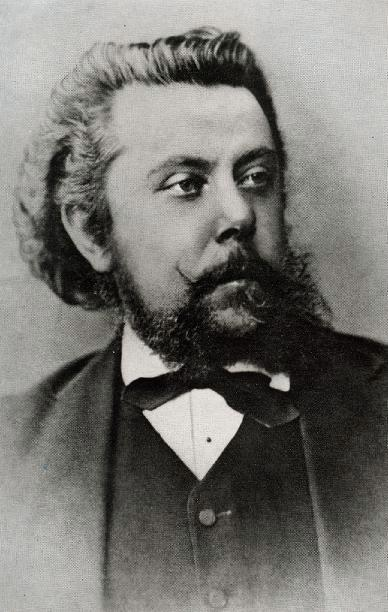
- Mussorgsky in 1874
- Native name: Песня о блохе
- Text: Johann Wolfgang von Goethe's Faust
- Language: Russian
- Composed: 1879
- Dedication: Vladimir Stasov
- Performed: Darya Leonova, April & May 1880
- Published: 1883
- Publisher: V. Bessel and Co.
- Duration: 3 minutes
- Scoring: Bass with piano accompaniment

The "Song of the Flea" (Russian: Песня о блохе) is a song with piano accompaniment, composed by Modest Mussorgsky in 1879. The lyrics are from the Russian translation of Johann Wolfgang von Goethe's Faust.

== Background ==
In 1879, Mussorgsky quit a civil service job, and, from August to November, accompanied contralto Darya Leonova (Дарья Леонова, 1829-1896) on a tour to Southern Russia, as her piano accompanist. He was much impressed by Leonova's singing, and composed the "Song of the Flea" during this trip or soon after he had returned to St. Petersburg, dedicating it to Leonova. It is unknown when the song was played in a public recital for the first time, but it is recorded that this song was sung in recitals by Leonova in April and May 1880.

The music score of the "Song of the Flea" was published after Mussorgsky's death, in 1883 with Nikolai Rimsky-Korsakov as the editor. Its orchestration by Igor Stravinsky became available in 1914.

The "Song of the Flea" is probably the best known of the 65 or so songs that Mussorgsky composed. It was originally composed for a female voice, but it has been sung by bass singers, such as Feodor Chaliapin. Chaliapin's rendition of the song was inducted into the Grammy Hall of Fame in 1999.

The tenor, Vladimir Rosing, also recorded the "Song of the Flea", once for Vocalion in the early 1920s, and again for Parlophone in 1933.

== Lyrics ==
The lyrics used were from the Russian translation by Alexander N. Strugovshchikov (1808-1878) of "Mephistopheles' song at Auerbach Cellar" (Russian: Песня Мефистофеля в погребке Ауербаха) in Part One of Johann Wolfgang von Goethe's Faust.

Russian	Transliteration	English translation
--- Жил, был король когда-то. При нём блоха жила. Блоха ! Блоха ! Милей родного брата Она ему была. Блоха, ха, ха, ха, ха, ха. Блоха. Ха, ха, ха, ха, ха. Блоха ! --- Зовёт король портного. — Послушай, ты, чурбан, Для друга дорогого Сшей бархатный кафтан ! Блохе кафтан ? Ха, ха, ха, ха, ха, ха. Блохе ? Ха, ха, ха, ха, ха. Кафтан ! Ха, ха, ха, ха, ха. Ха, ха, ха, ха, ха. Блохе кафтан? --- Вот в золото и бархат блоха наряжена, И полная свобода ей при дворе дана. При дворе хе-хе-хе-хе-хе блохе ха-ха-ха, Ха-ха-ха-ха-ха-ха блохе. --- Король ей сан министра и с ним звезду даёт, И с нею и другие пошли все блохи в ход а-ха. И самой Королеве и фрейлинам ея От блох не стало мочи, не стало и житья ха-ха. --- И тронуть-то боятся не то чтобы их бить, А мы, кто стал кусаться, тотчас давай душить. Ха-ха-ха-ха-ха ха-ха-ха, Ха-ха-ха-ха-ха ха-ха-ха-ха, А а-ха-ха ха-ха.	--- Zhil, byl korol kogda-to. Pri nyom blokha zhila. Blokha! Blokha! Miley rodnogo brata Ona emu byla. Blokha, kha，kha，kha, kha，kha. Blokha. Kha，kha，kha，kha，kha! Blokha! --- Zovyot korol portnogo: "Poslushay, ty, churban, Dlya druga dorogogo Sshey barkhatny kaftan?" Blokhe kaftan? Kha，kha, kha, kha, kha, kha. Blokhe? Kha, kha, kha, kha, kha! Kaftan! Kha, kha, kha, kha, kha. Kha, kha, kha, kha, kha. Blokhe kaftan? --- Vot v zoloto i barkhat blokha naryazhena, I polnaya svoboda ey pri dvore dana. Pri dvore khe-khe-khe-khe-khe blokhe kha-kha-kha, Kha-kha-kha-kha-kha-kha blokhe. --- Korol ey san ministra i s nim zvezdu dayot, !I s neyu i drugie poshli vse blokhi v khod a-kha I samoy Koroleve i freylinam eya Ot blokh ne stalo mochi, ne stalo i zhityya kha-kha. --- I tronut-to boyatsya ne to chtoby ikh bit, A my, kto stal kusatsya, totchas davay dushit. Kha-kha-kha-kha-kha kha-kha-kha, Kha-kha-kha-kha-kha kha-kha-kha-kha, A a-kha-kha kha-kha.	--- There lived a king once upon a time, With him lived a flea. A Flea! A Flea! Dearer than his own brother It was to him. A Flea, ha, ha, ha, ha, ha. A Flea. Ha, ha, ha, ha, ha! A Flea! --- The king called for a tailor: "Listen, you, stupid guy, For my dear friend Make a velvety caftan!" For the Flea a caftan? Ha, ha, ha, ha, ha, ha. For the Flea? Ha, ha, ha, ha, ha! A caftan Ha, ha, ha, ha, ha. Ha, ha, ha, ha, ha. For the Flea a caftan? --- Wearing gold and a coat my Flea lived, And complete freedom in the palace it was given. In the palace ha-ha-ha-ha-ha, for the Flea ha-ha-ha, Ha-ha-ha-ha-ha-ha, for the Flea. --- The King made it a minister and gave it a medal, And all its relatives were promoted, a-ha. And the Queen and her ladies-in-waiting's lives Became impossible because of the fleas, ha-ha. --- They are afraid to touch the fleas, to say nothing of killing them. As for us, we will kill anybody as soon as it bites us. Ha-ha-ha-ha-ha, ha-ha-ha, Ha-ha-ha-ha-ha, ha-ha-ha-ha, A a-ha-ha ha-ha.

== See also ==
- Faust by Johann Wolfgang von Goethe
