= Koonwarra =

- Town
- Coordinates: 38°32′50″S 145°56′49″E
- Country: Australia
- State: Victoria
- LGA: South Gippsland Shire

Government
  - State electorate: Gippsland South
  - Federal division: Monash

Population
  - Total: 366 (2021 census)
- Postcode: 3954

Koonwarra is a town in the South Gippsland region of Victoria, Australia. At the 2021 census, Koonwarra had a population of 366. The town straddles the South Gippsland Highway. Located around 128 km southeast of Melbourne, the town was served by rail from the 1890s until 1991 with the closing of the rail line to Barry Beach.

== Koonwarra fossil bed ==
The Koonwarra fossil bed was found by accident in 1961 during roadworks to realign a segment of the South Gippsland Highway. Dating from the Early Cretaceous 115 million years ago, it is composed of mudstone sediment thought to have been laid down in a freshwater (possibly cool-climate subalpine) lake. The site is an important element of Australia's fossil record, with plants, insects (including mayflies, dragonflies, cockroaches, beetles, fleas, flies and wasps), spiders, crustaceans and fish recovered. Among them is the unusual finding of a fossil horseshoe crab, Victalimulus mcqueeni. Small segments of a leafy twig have been recovered that were thought to be one of the oldest angiosperms (flowering plants) discovered; more recent examination reports anatomy more typical of a gnetophyte, a group of plants for which there is a scant fossil record. A fossil member of the Ginkgo family, Ginkgoites australis, has also been recovered.

Six well-preserved feathers have been recovered, indicating more complete remains of feathered dinosaurs might be found, however the site has been little-excavated; extensive removal of overlying rock has to take place before further excavation.
