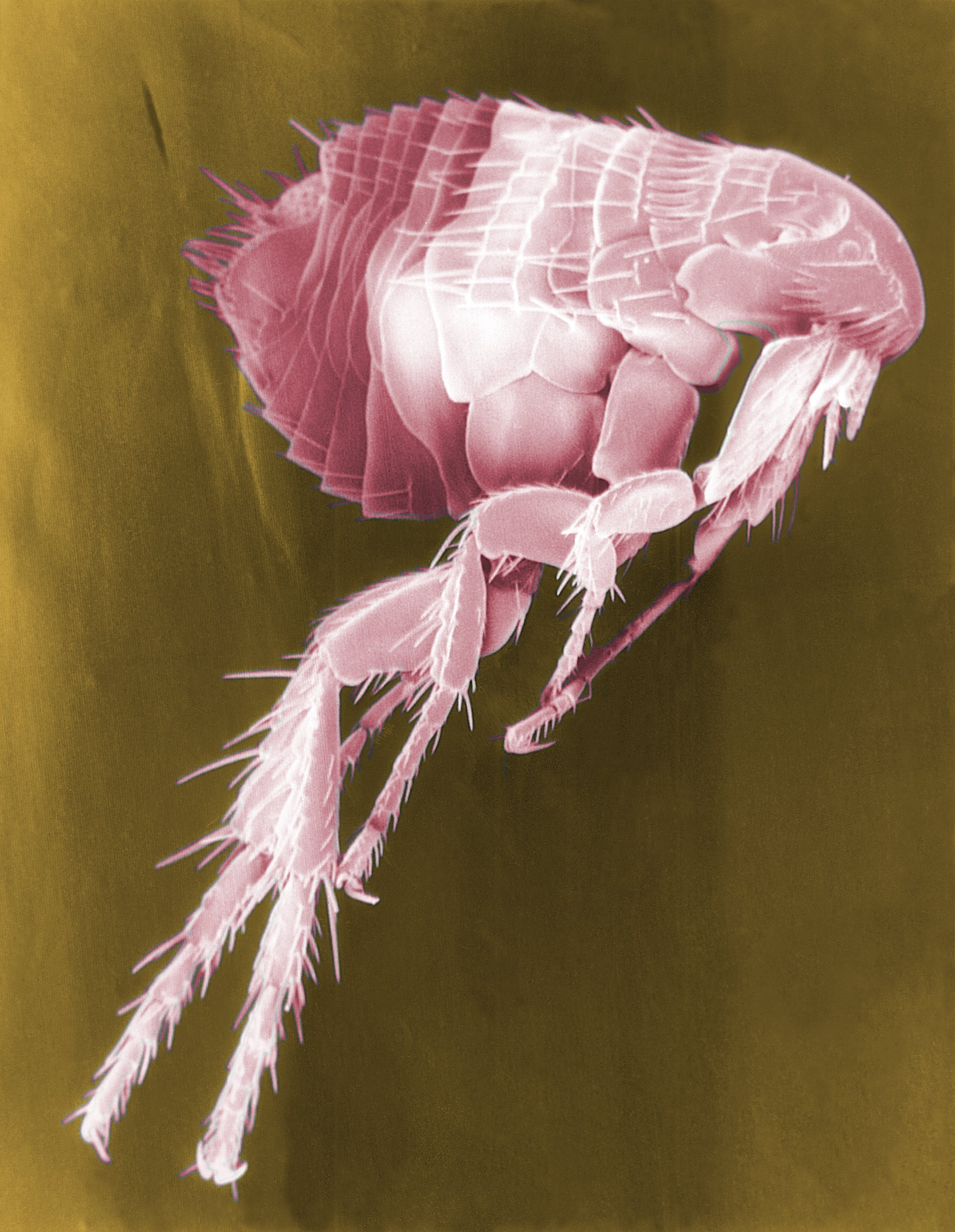
- Scanning electron micrograph

Scientific classification
- Kingdom: Animalia
- Phylum: Arthropoda
- Clade: Pancrustacea
- Class: Insecta
- Clade: Aparaglossata
- Superorder: Panorpida
- Clade: Antliophora
- Order: Siphonaptera; Latreille, 1825

Suborders
- †Pseudopulicidae; †Saurophthiridae; †Tarwiniidae; Ceratophyllomorpha; Hystrichopsyllomorpha; Pulicomorpha; Pygiopsyllomorpha

Synonyms
- Aphaniptera

= Flea =

Fleas Temporal range: Middle Jurassic – Recent

Insects of the order Siphonaptera

Flea, the common name for the order Siphonaptera, includes 2,500 species of small flightless insects that live as external parasites of mammals and birds. Fleas live by ingesting the blood of their hosts. Adult fleas grow to about 3 millimetres (1/8 inch) long, are usually dark in color, and have bodies that are "flattened" sideways or narrow, enabling them to move through their hosts' fur or feathers. They lack wings; their hind legs are extremely well adapted for jumping. Their claws keep them from being dislodged, and their mouthparts are adapted for piercing skin and sucking blood. Some species can leap 50 times their body length, a feat second only to jumps made by another group of insects, the superfamily of froghoppers. Flea larvae are worm-like, with no limbs; they have chewing mouthparts and feed on organic debris left on their hosts' skin.

Genetic evidence indicates that fleas are a specialised lineage of parasitic scorpionflies (Mecoptera) sensu lato, most closely related to the family Nannochoristidae. The earliest known fleas lived in the Middle Jurassic; modern-looking forms appeared in the Cenozoic. Fleas probably originated on mammals first and expanded their reach to birds. Each species of flea specializes, more or less, on one species of host: many species of flea never breed on any other host; some are less selective. Some families of fleas are exclusive to a single host group; for example, the Malacopsyllidae are found only on armadillos, the Ischnopsyllidae only on bats, and the Chimaeropsyllidae only on elephant shrews.

The oriental rat flea, Xenopsylla cheopis, is a vector of Yersinia pestis, the bacterium that causes bubonic plague. The disease was spread to humans by rodents, such as the black rat, which were bitten by infected fleas. Major outbreaks included the Plague of Justinian, about 540, and the Black Death, about 1350, each of which killed a sizeable fraction of the world's people.

Fleas appear in human culture in such diverse forms as flea circuses; poems, such as John Donne's erotic "The Flea"; works of music, such as Modest Mussorgsky's "Song of the Flea" (1879); and The Professor, an uncompleted and unreleased 1919 film by Charlie Chaplin.

== Morphology and behavior ==
Fleas are wingless insects, 1.5 to 3.3 millimetres (1/16 to 1/8 inch) long, that are agile, usually dark colored (for example, the reddish-brown of the cat flea), with a proboscis, or stylet, adapted to feeding by piercing the skin and sucking their host's blood through their epipharynx. Flea legs end in strong claws that are adapted to grasp a host.

Unlike other insects, fleas do not possess compound eyes but instead only have simple eyespots with a single biconvex lens; some species lack eyes altogether. Their bodies are laterally compressed, permitting easy movement through the hairs or feathers on the host's body. The flea body is covered with hard plates called sclerites. These sclerites are covered with many hairs and short spines directed backward, which also assist its movements on the host. The tough body is able to withstand great pressure, likely an adaptation to survive attempts to eliminate them by scratching.

Fleas lay tiny, white, oval eggs. The larvae are small and pale, have bristles covering their worm-like bodies, lack eyes, and have mouth parts adapted to chewing. The larvae feed on organic matter, especially the feces of mature fleas, which contain dried blood. Adults feed only on fresh blood.

=== Jumping ===
Their legs are long, the hind pair well adapted for jumping; a flea can jump vertically up to 18 centimetres (7 inches) and horizontally up to 33 cm (13 in), making the flea one of the best jumpers of all known animals (relative to body size), second only to the froghopper. A flea can jump 60 times its length in height and 110 times its length in distance, equivalent to a 1.8 m (6 ft) adult human jumping 110 m (361 ft) vertically and 200 m (656 ft) horizontally. Rarely do fleas jump from dog to dog. Most flea infestations come from newly developed fleas from the pet's environment. The flea jump is so rapid and forceful that it exceeds the capabilities of muscle, and instead of relying on direct muscle power, fleas store muscle energy in a pad of the elastic protein named resilin before releasing it rapidly (like a human using a bow and arrow). Immediately before the jump, muscles contract and deform the resilin pad, slowly storing energy which can then be released extremely rapidly to power leg extension for propulsion. To prevent premature release of energy or motions of the leg, the flea employs a "catch mechanism". Early in the jump, the tendon of the primary jumping muscle passes slightly behind the coxa-trochanter joint, generating a torque which holds the joint closed with the leg close to the body. To trigger jumping, another muscle pulls the tendon forward until it passes the joint axis, generating the opposite torque to extend the leg and power the jump by release of stored energy. The actual take off has been shown by high-speed video to be from the tibiae and tarsi rather than from the trochantera (knees).

== Life cycle and development ==
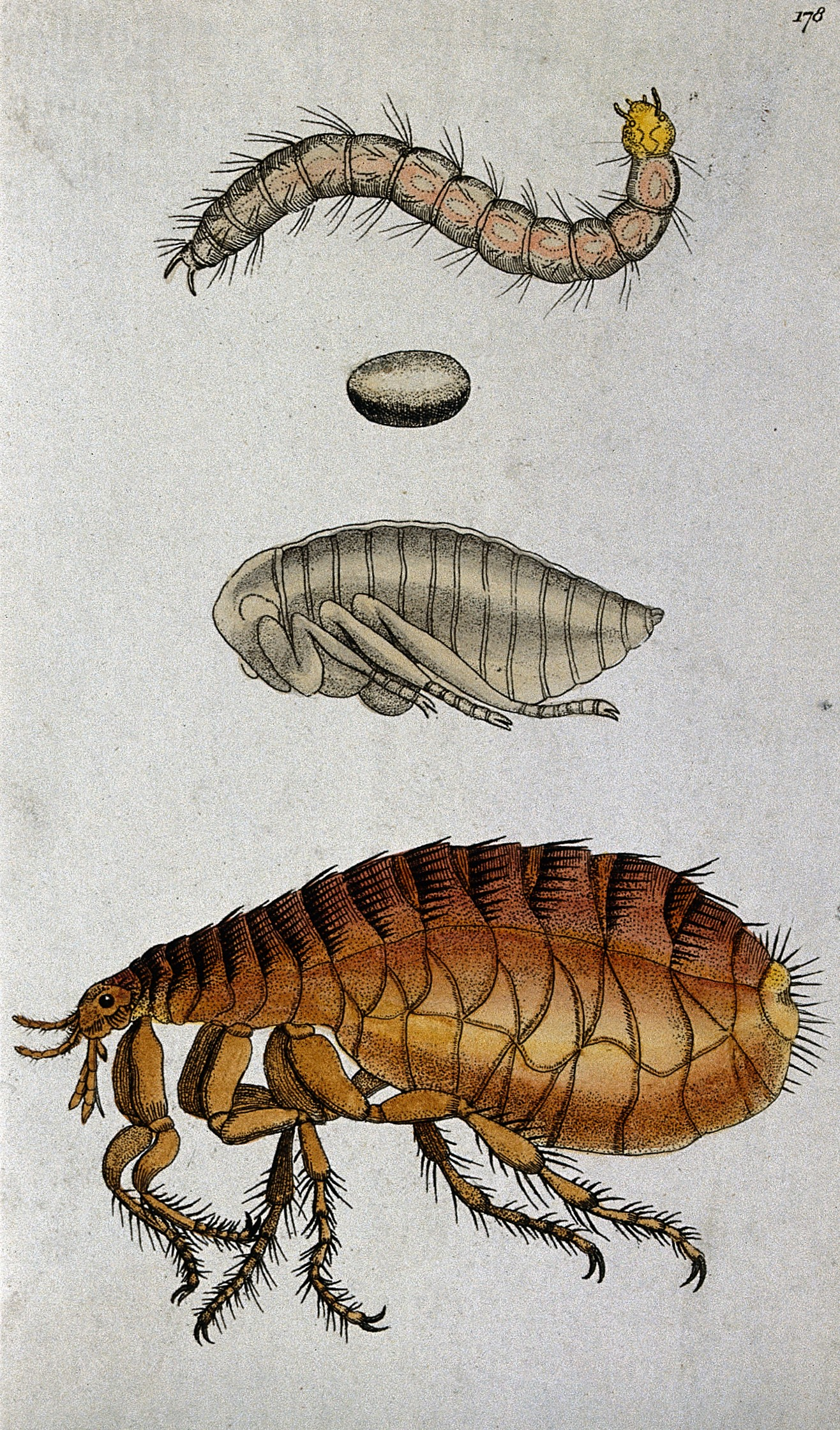
Dog flea (from top) larva, egg, pupa and adult

Fleas are holometabolous insects, going through the four lifecycle stages of egg, larva, pupa, and imago (adult). In most species, neither female nor male fleas are fully mature when they first emerge but must feed on blood before they become capable of reproduction. The first blood meal triggers the maturation of the ovaries in females and the dissolution of the testicular plug in males, and copulation soon follows. Some species breed all year round while others synchronise their activities with their hosts' life cycles or with local environmental factors and climatic conditions. Flea populations consist of roughly 50% eggs, 35% larvae, 10% pupae, and 5% adults.

=== Egg ===
The number of eggs laid depends on species, with batch sizes ranging from two to several dozen. The total number of eggs produced in a female's lifetime (fecundity) varies from around one hundred to several thousand. In some species, the flea lives in the host's nest or burrow and the eggs are deposited on the substrate, but in others, the eggs are laid on the host itself and can easily fall off onto the ground. Because of this, areas where the host rests and sleeps become one of the primary habitats of eggs and developing larvae. The eggs take around two days to two weeks to hatch.

=== Larva ===
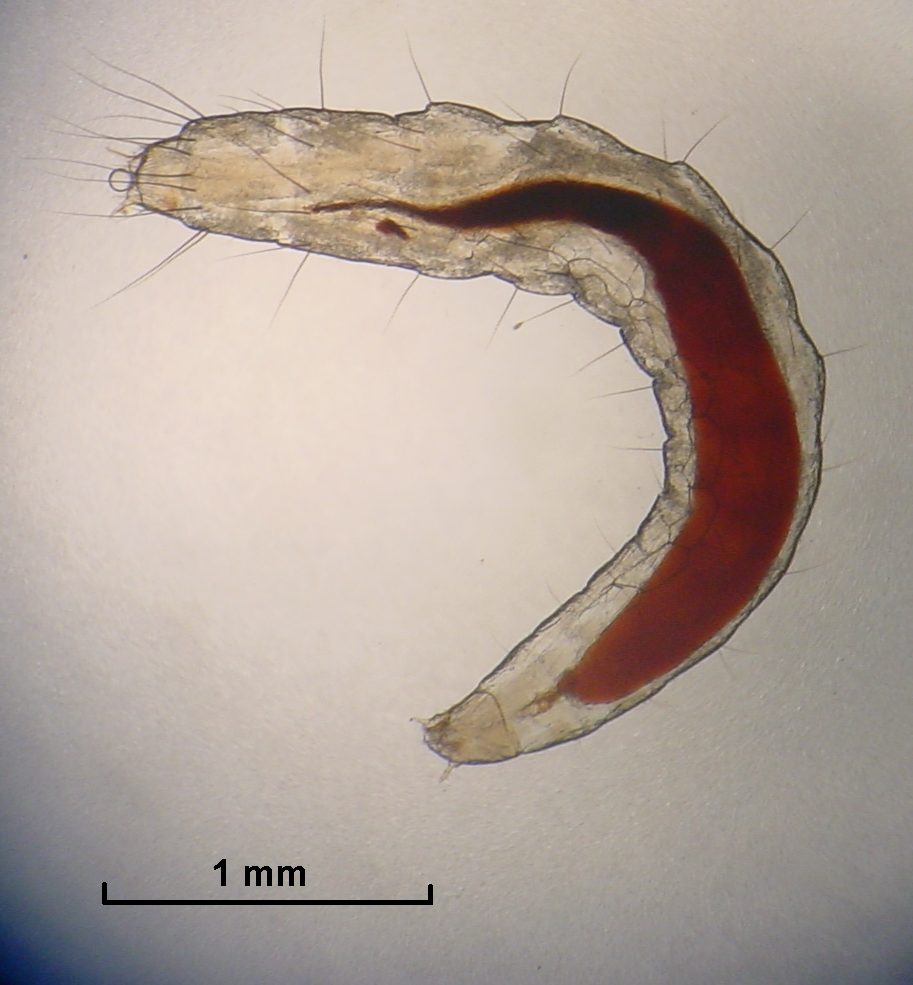
Flea larva

Flea larvae emerge from the eggs to feed on any available organic material such as dead insects, faeces, conspecific eggs, and vegetable matter; some species are subdermal endoparasites on their parent's hosts. In laboratory studies, some dietary diversity seems necessary for proper larval development. Blood-only diets allow only 12% of larvae to mature, whereas blood and yeast or dog chow diets allow almost all larvae to mature. Another study also showed that 90% of larvae matured into adults when the diet included nonviable eggs. They are blind and avoid sunlight, keeping to dark, humid places such as sand or soil, cracks and crevices, under carpets and in bedding. The entire larval stage lasts between four and 18 days.

=== Pupa ===
Given an adequate supply of food, larvae pupate and weave silken cocoons after three larval stages. Within the cocoon, the larva molts for a final time and undergoes metamorphosis into the adult form. This can take just four days, but may take much longer under adverse conditions, and there follows a variable-length stage during which the pre-emergent adult awaits a suitable opportunity to emerge. Trigger factors for emergence include vibrations (including sound), heat (in warm-blooded hosts), and increased levels of carbon dioxide, all of which may indicate the presence of a suitable host. Large numbers of pre-emergent fleas may be present in otherwise flea-free environments, and the introduction of a suitable host may trigger a mass emergence.

=== Adult ===
Once the flea reaches adulthood, its primary goal is to find blood and then to reproduce. Female fleas can lay 5000 or more eggs over their life, permitting rapid increase in numbers. Generally speaking, an adult flea only lives for 2 or 3 months. Without a host to provide a blood meal, a flea's life can be as short as a few days. Under ideal conditions of temperature, food supply, and humidity, adult fleas can live for up to a year and a half. Completely developed adult fleas can live for several months without eating, so long as they do not emerge from their puparia. Optimum temperatures for the flea's life cycle are 21 to 30 °C (70 to 86 °F) and optimum humidity is 70%.

Adult female rabbit fleas, Spilopsyllus cuniculi, can detect the changing levels of cortisol and corticosterone hormones in the rabbit's blood that indicate it is getting close to giving birth. This triggers sexual maturity in the fleas and they start producing eggs. As soon as the baby rabbits are born, the fleas make their way down to them and once on board they start feeding, mating, and laying eggs. After 12 days, the adult fleas make their way back to the mother. They complete this mini-migration every time she gives birth.

== Taxonomy and phylogeny ==
=== History ===
Between 1735 and 1758, the Swedish naturalist Carl Linnaeus first classified insects, doing so on the basis of their wing structure. One of the seven orders into which he divided them was "Aptera", meaning wingless, a group in which as well as fleas, he included spiders, woodlice and myriapods. It wasn't until 1810 that the French zoologist Pierre André Latreille reclassified the insects on the basis of their mouthparts as well as their wings, splitting Aptera into Thysanura (silverfish), Anoplura (sucking lice) and Siphonaptera (fleas), at the same time separating off the arachnids and crustaceans into their own subphyla. The group's name, Siphonaptera, is zoological Latin from the Greek siphon (a tube) and aptera (wingless).

=== External phylogeny ===
It was historically unclear whether the Siphonaptera are sister to the Mecoptera (scorpionflies and allies), or are inside that clade, making "Mecoptera" paraphyletic. The earlier suggestion that the Siphonaptera are sister to the Boreidae (snow scorpionflies) is not supported. A 2020 genetic study recovered Siphonaptera within Mecoptera, with strong support, as the sister group to Nannochoristidae, a small, relictual group of mecopterans native to the Southern Hemisphere. Fleas and nannochoristids share several similarities with each other that are not shared with other mecopterans, including similar mouthparts as well as a similar sperm pump organisation.

Relationships of Siphonaptera per Tihelka et al. 2020.

- Antliophora
  - Diptera (true flies)
  - - Boreidae (snow scorpionflies, 30 spp.)
    - - - Nannochoristidae (southern scorpionflies, 8 spp.)
        - Siphonaptera (fleas, 2500 spp.)
      - Pistillifera (scorpionflies, hangingflies, 400 spp.)

=== Fossil history ===
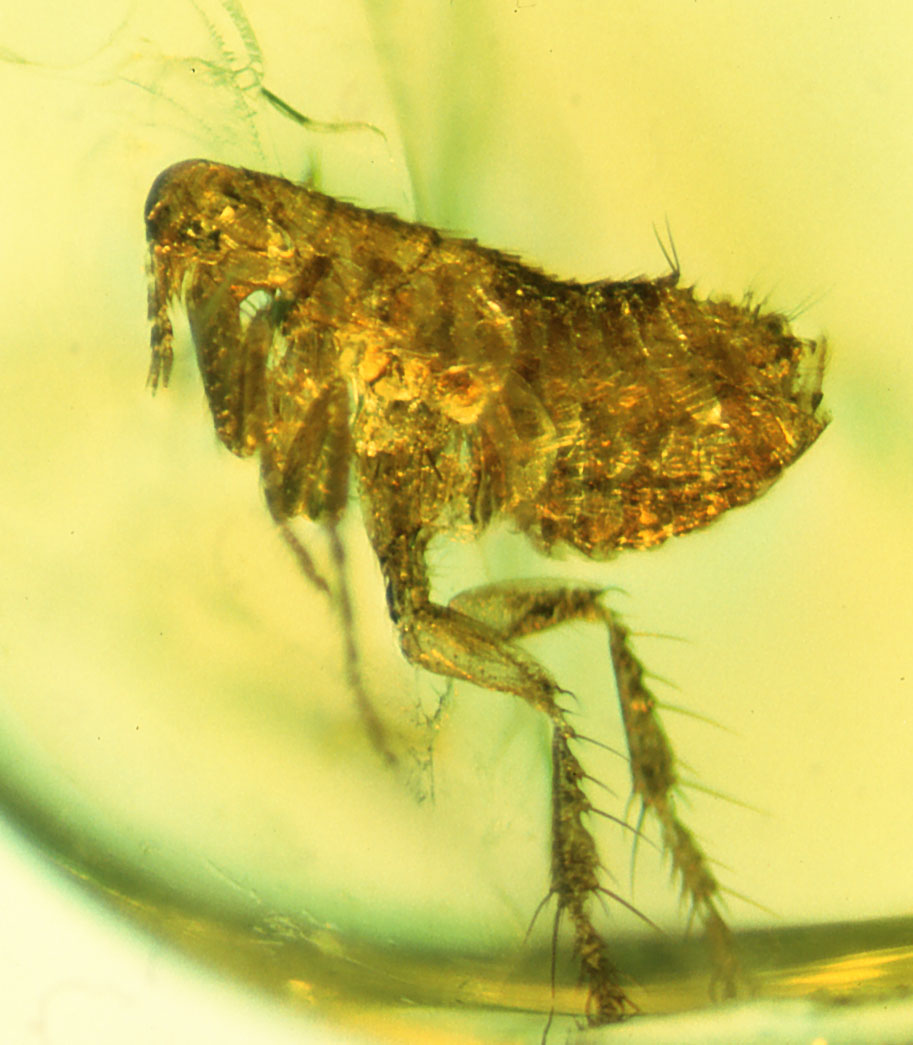
Cenozoic flea in amber, c. 20 mya, is morphologically modern.

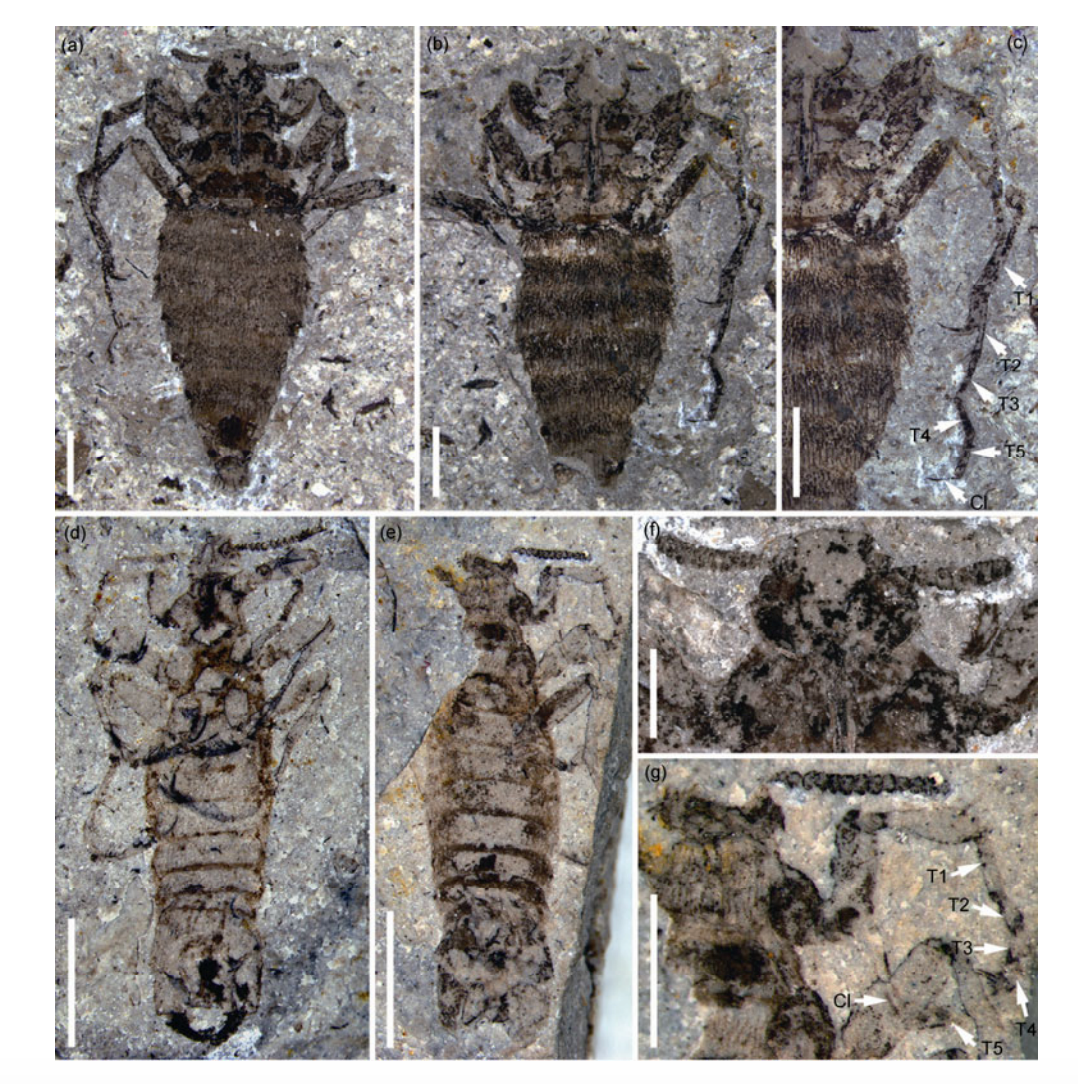
Pseudopulex wangi, a primitive flea from the Early Cretaceous of China

Fleas likely descended from scorpionflies, insects that are predators or scavengers. Fossils of large, wingless stem-group fleas with siphonate (sucking) mouthparts from the Middle Jurassic to Early Cretaceous have been found in northeastern China and Russia, belonging to the families Saurophthiridae and Pseudopulicidae, as well as Tarwinia from the Early Cretaceous of Australia. Most flea families formed after the end of the Cretaceous (in the Paleogene and onwards). Modern fleas probably arose in the southern continental area of Gondwana, and migrated rapidly northwards from there. They most likely evolved with mammal hosts, only later moving to birds.

Siphonaptera is a relatively small order of insects: members of the order undergo complete metamorphosis and are secondarily wingless (their ancestors had wings which modern forms have lost). In 2005, Medvedev listed 2005 species in 242 genera, and despite subsequent descriptions of new species, bringing the total up to around 2500 species, this is the most complete database available. The order is divided into four infraorders and eighteen families. Some families are exclusive to a single host group; these include the Malacopsyllidae (armadillos), Ischnopsyllidae (bats) and Chimaeropsyllidae (elephant shrews).

Many of the known species are little studied. Some 600 species (a quarter of the total) are known from single records. Over 94% of species are associated with mammalian hosts, and only about 3% of species can be considered to be specific parasites of birds. The fleas on birds are thought to have originated from mammalian fleas; at least sixteen separate groups of fleas switched to avian hosts during the evolutionary history of the Siphonaptera. Occurrences of fleas on reptiles is accidental, and fleas have been known to feed on the hemolymph (bloodlike body fluid) of ticks.

=== Internal phylogeny ===
Flea phylogeny was long neglected, the discovery of homologies with the parts of other insects being made difficult by their extreme specialization. Whiting and colleagues prepared a detailed molecular phylogeny in 2008, with the basic structure shown in the cladogram. The Hectopsyllidae, including the harmful chigoe flea or jigger, is sister to the rest of the Siphonaptera.

- Siphonaptera
  - Hectopsyllidae (inc. jigger)
  - - - - Pygiopsyllomorpha
        - - Macropsyllidae, Coptopsyllidae
          - Neotyphloceratini, Ctenophthalmini, Doratopsyllinae
      - - Stephanocircidae
        - clade inc. Rhopalopsyllidae, Ctenophthalmidae, Hystrichopsyllidae
    - - - Chimaeropsyllidae
        - Pulicidae (inc. the rat flea, vector of bubonic plague)
      - Ceratophyllomorpha (inc. the Ceratophyllidae, such as the widespread moorhen flea)

== Taxonomy ==
As of 2023, there are 21 recognized families within the order Siphonaptera, 3 of which are extinct. In addition, some researchers have suggested that the subfamily Stenoponiinae should be elevated to its own family (Stenoponiidae).

- Ancistropsyllidae Toumanoff & Fuller, 1947
- Ceratophyllidae Dampf, 1908
- Chimaeropsyllidae Ewing & I. Fox, 1943
- Coptopsyllidae Wagner, 1928
- Ctenophthalmidae Rothschild, 1915
- Hystrichopsyllidae Tiraboschi, 1904
- Ischnopsyllidae Wahlgren, 1907
- Leptopsyllidae Rothschild & Jordan, 1915
- Lycopsyllidae Baker, 1905
- Malacopsyllidae Baker, 1905
- Pseudopulicidae† Gao, Shih & Ren, 2012
- Pulicidae Billberg, 1820
- Pygiopsyllidae Wagner, 1939
- Rhopalopsyllidae Oudemans, 1909
- Saurophthiridae† Ponomarenko, 1986
- Stephanocircidae Wagner, 1928
- Stivaliidae Mardon, 1978
- Tarwiniidae† Huang, Engel, Cai & Nel, 2013
- Tungidae Fox, 1925
- Vermipsyllidae Wagner, 1889
- Xiphiopsyllidae Wagner, 1939

== Relationship with host ==
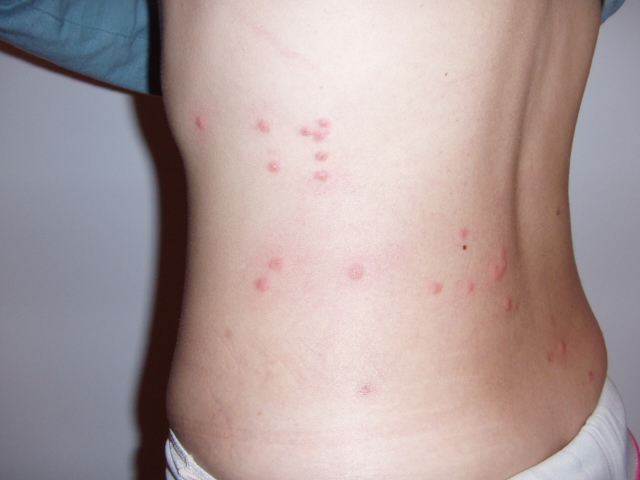
Flea bites in humans.

Fleas feed on a wide variety of warm-blooded vertebrates including dogs, cats, rabbits, squirrels, ferrets, rats, mice, birds, and humans. Fleas normally specialise in one host species or group of species, but can often feed but not reproduce on other species. Ceratophyllus gallinae affects poultry as well as wild birds. As well as the degree of relatedness of a potential host to the flea's original host, it has been shown that avian fleas that exploit a range of hosts, only parasitise species with low immune responses. In general, host specificity decreases as the size of the host species decreases. Another factor is the opportunities available to the flea to change host species; this is smaller in colonially nesting birds, where the flea may never encounter another species, than it is in solitary nesting birds. A large, long-lived host provides a stable environment that favours host-specific parasites.

Although there are species named dog fleas (Ctenocephalides canis Curtis, 1826) and cat fleas (Ctenocephalides felis), fleas are not always strictly species-specific. A study in Virginia examined 244 fleas from 29 dogs: all were cat fleas. Dog fleas had not been found in Virginia in more than 70 years, and may not even occur in the US, so a flea found on a dog in the United States is likely a cat flea (Ctenocephalides felis).

One theory of human hairlessness is that the loss of hair helped humans to reduce their burden of fleas and other ectoparasites.

=== Direct effects of bites ===
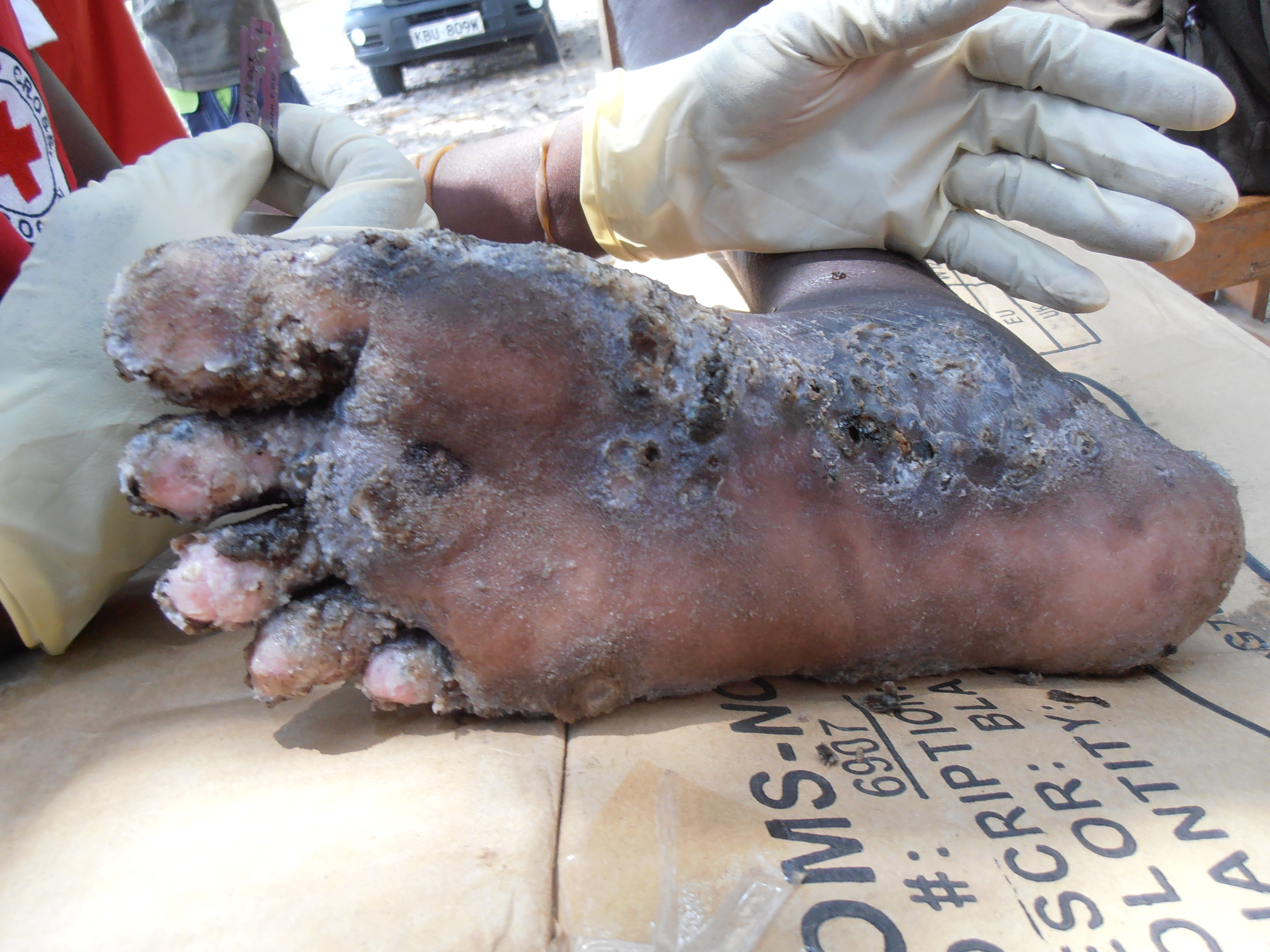
Human foot infested with jigger fleas, Tunga penetrans

In many species, fleas are principally a nuisance to their hosts, causing an itching sensation which in turn causes the host to try to remove the pest by biting, pecking or scratching. Fleas are not simply a source of annoyance, however. Flea bites cause a slightly raised, swollen, irritating nodule to form on the epidermis at the site of each bite, with a single puncture point at the centre, similar to a mosquito bite. This can lead to an eczematous itchy skin disease called flea allergy dermatitis, which is common in many host species, including dogs and cats. The bites often appear in clusters or lines of two bites, and can remain itchy and inflamed for up to several weeks afterwards. Fleas can lead to secondary hair loss as a result of frequent scratching and biting by the animal. They can also cause anemia in extreme cases.

=== As a vector ===
Fleas are vectors for viral, bacterial and rickettsial diseases of humans and other animals, as well as of protozoan and helminth parasites. Bacterial diseases carried by fleas include murine or endemic typhus and bubonic plague. Fleas can transmit Rickettsia typhi, Rickettsia felis, Bartonella henselae, and the myxomatosis virus. They can carry Hymenolepiasis tapeworms and Trypanosome protozoans. The chigoe flea or jigger (Tunga penetrans) causes the disease tungiasis, a major public health problem around the world. Fleas that specialize as parasites on specific mammals may use other mammals as hosts; thus, humans may be bitten by cat and dog fleas.

== Relationship with humans ==
=== In literature and art ===
Fleas have appeared in poetry, literature, music and art; these include Robert Hooke's drawing of a flea under the microscope in his pioneering book Micrographia published in 1665, poems by Donne and Jonathan Swift, works of music by Giorgio Federico Ghedini and Modest Mussorgsky, a play by Georges Feydeau, a film by Charlie Chaplin, and paintings by artists such as Giuseppe Crespi, Giovanni Battista Piazzetta, and Georges de La Tour.

John Donne's erotic metaphysical poem "The Flea", published in 1633 after his death, uses the conceit of a flea, which has sucked blood from the male speaker and his female lover, as an extended metaphor for their sexual relationship. The speaker tries to convince a lady to sleep with him, arguing that if the mingling of their blood in the flea is innocent, then sex would be also.

The comic poem Siphonaptera, published in 1872 by the mathematician Augustus De Morgan, describes an infinite chain of parasitism made of ever larger and ever smaller fleas.

In recent decades, 'flea' has become a term synonymous with small, fast, and dexterous. For this reason Argentinian football player Lionel Messi (also known as Fleonel Messi) was given the nickname 'La Pulga' or 'The Flea.' As he grew and turned professional and expanded his career, the media turned to calling him 'La Pulga Atómica' or 'The Atomic Flea.' Because of Lionel 'The Flea' Messi, fleas are associated now in pop culture with football.

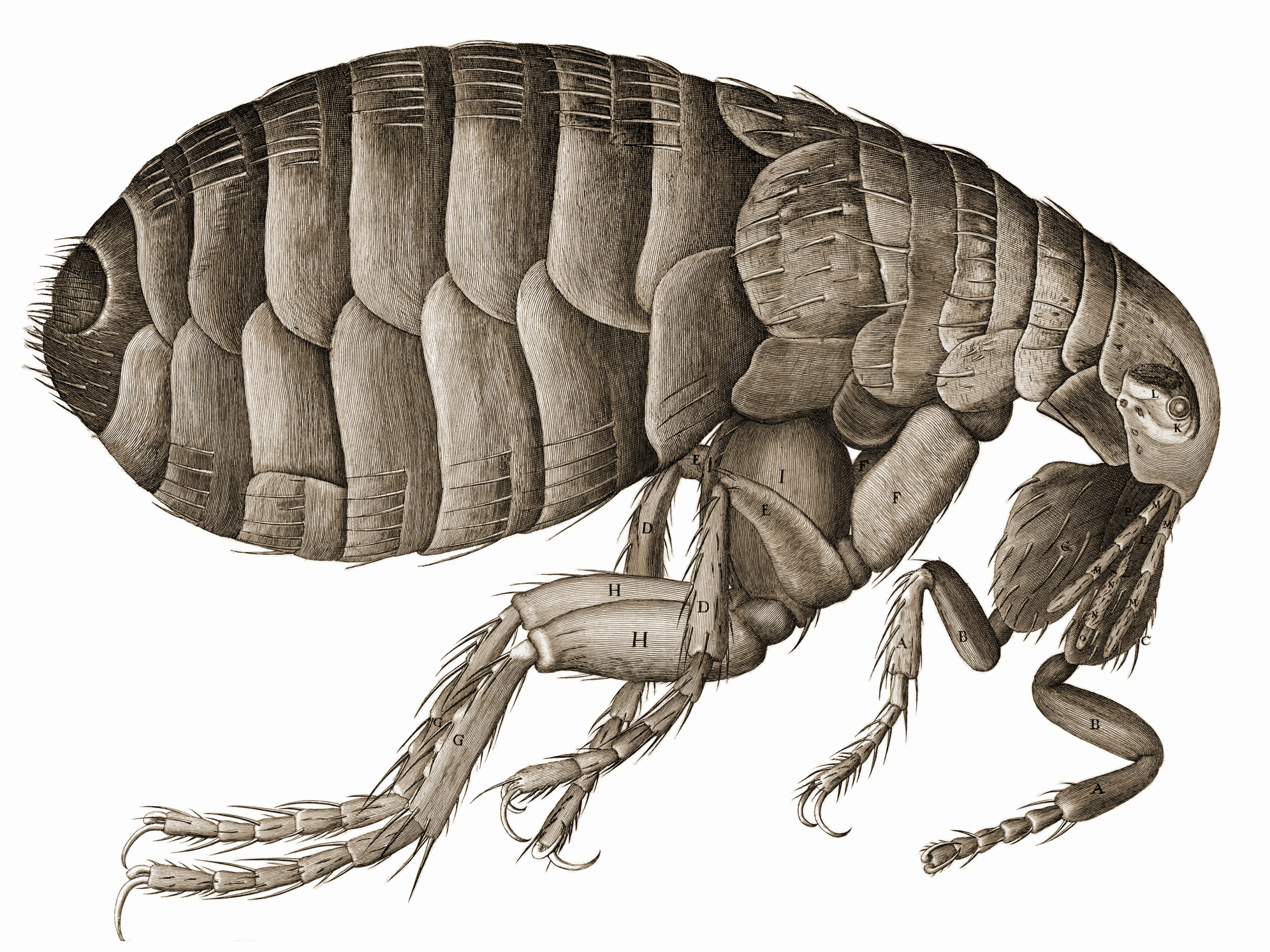
Robert Hooke's drawing of a flea in Micrographia, 1665

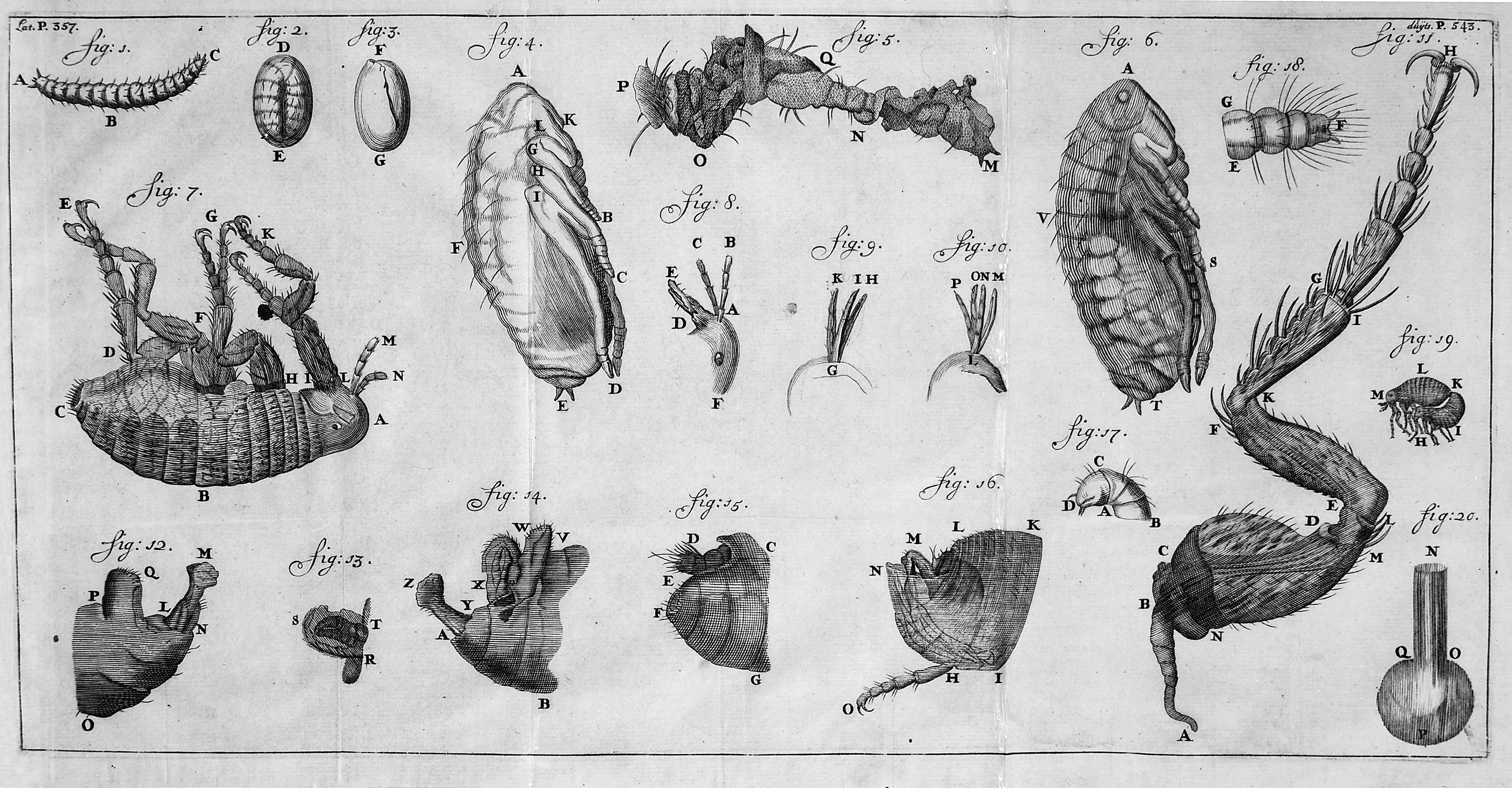
Development of the flea from egg to adult. Antonie van Leeuwenhoek, c. 1680

Children's author Michael Rosen wrote Nasty!, a collection of short stories, in 2009. The main story in the collection is The Bakerloo Flea, which follows a group of cleaners in the London Underground as they try to kill a giant flea which develops a taste for human blood.

=== Flea circuses ===
Flea circuses provided entertainment to nineteenth century audiences. These circuses, extremely popular in Europe from 1830 onwards, featured fleas dressed as humans or towing miniature carts, chariots, rollers or cannon. These devices were originally made by watchmakers or jewellers to show off their skill at miniaturization. A ringmaster called a "professor" accompanied their performance with a rapid circus patter.

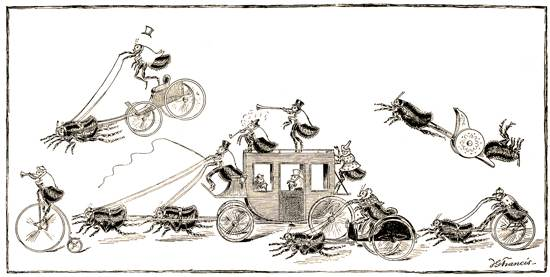
A flea circus: "The Go-As-You-Please Race, as seen through a Magnifying Glass", engraved by J. G. Francis, from an article by C. F. Holder in St. Nicholas Magazine, 1886

=== Carriers of plague ===
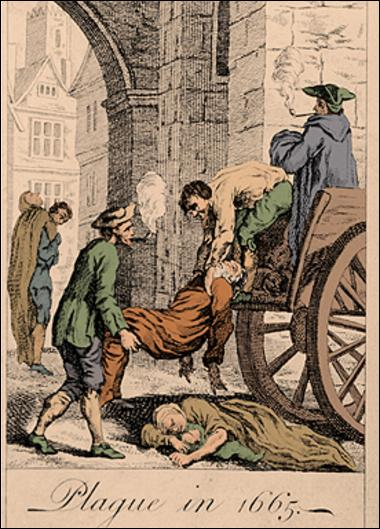
The Great Plague of London, in 1665, killed up to 100,000 people.

Oriental rat fleas, Xenopsylla cheopis, can carry the coccobacillus Yersinia pestis. The infected fleas feed on rodent vectors of this bacterium, such as the black rat, Rattus rattus, and then infect human populations with the plague, as has happened repeatedly from ancient times, as in the Plague of Justinian in 541–542. Outbreaks killed up to 200 million people across Europe between 1346 and 1671. The Black Death pandemic between 1346 and 1353 likely killed over a third of the population of Europe.

Because fleas carry plague, they have seen service as a biological weapon. During World War II, the Japanese army dropped fleas infested with Y. pestis in China. The bubonic and septicaemic plagues are the most probable form of the plague that would spread as a result of a bioterrorism attack that used fleas as a vector.

=== The Rothschild Collection ===
The banker Charles Rothschild devoted much of his time to entomology, creating a large collection of fleas now in the Rothschild Collection at the Natural History Museum, London. He discovered and named the plague vector flea, Xenopsylla cheopis, also known as the oriental rat flea, in 1903. Using what was probably the world's most complete collection of fleas of about 260,000 specimens (representing some 73% of the 2,587 species and subspecies so far described), he described around 500 species and subspecies of Siphonaptera. He was followed in this interest by his daughter Miriam Rothschild, who helped to catalogue his enormous collection of the insects in seven volumes.

=== Flea treatments ===
Fleas have a significant economic impact. In America alone, approximately $2.8 billion is spent annually on flea-related veterinary bills and another $1.6 billion annually for flea treatment with pet groomers. Four billion dollars is spent annually for prescription flea treatment and $348 million for flea pest control.

== See also ==
- Chigger
- Louse
