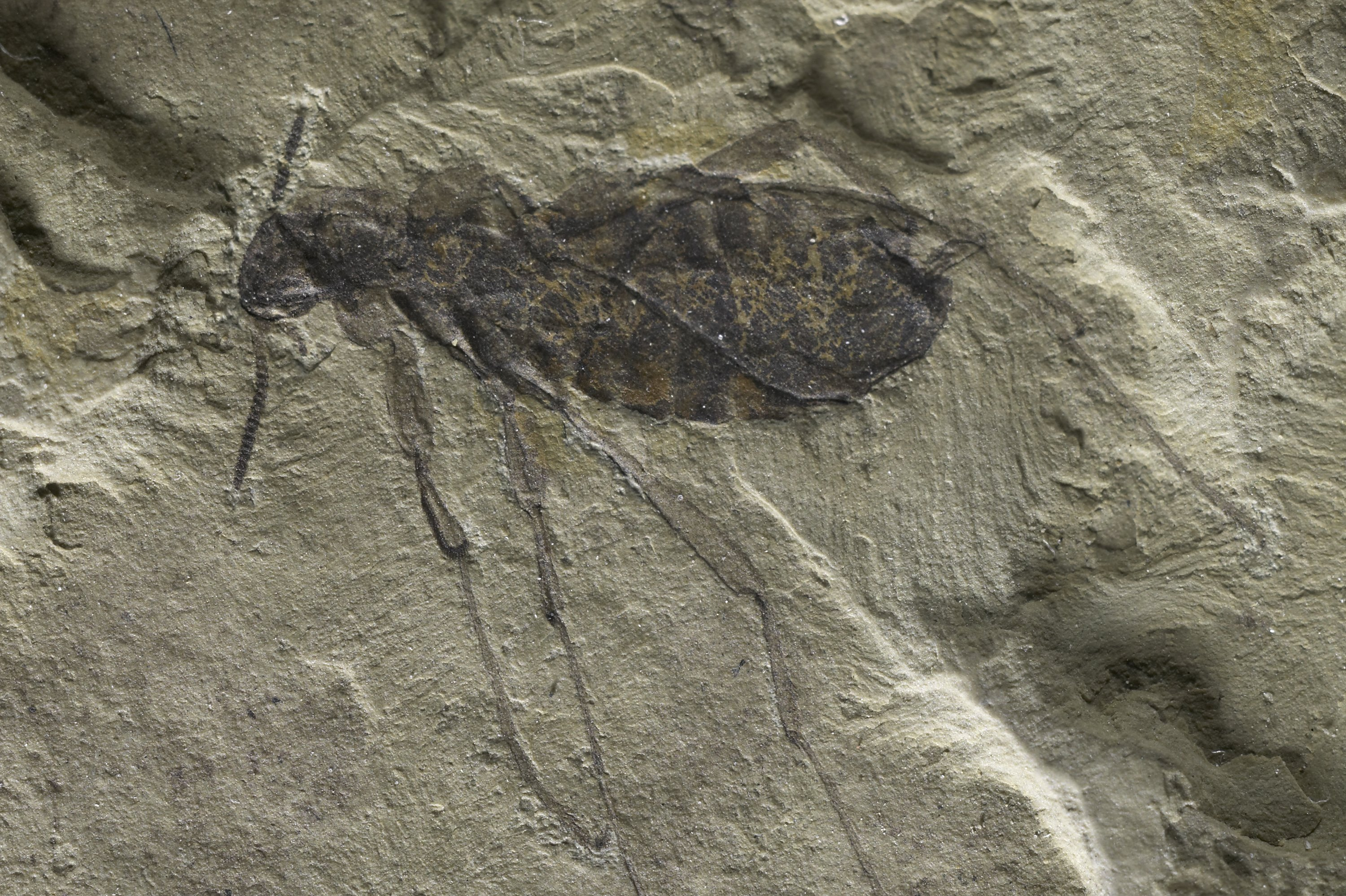

Scientific classification
- Kingdom: Animalia
- Phylum: Arthropoda
- Clade: Pancrustacea
- Class: Insecta
- Order: Siphonaptera
- Family: †Tarwiniidae; Huang et al. 2013
- Genus: †Tarwinia; P. A. Jell and P. M. Duncan. 1986
- Species: †T. australis

Binomial name
- †Tarwinia australis P. A. Jell and P. M. Duncan. 1986

= Tarwinia =

Tarwinia Temporal range: Aptian

Extinct genus of flea

Tarwinia is an extinct genus of stem-group flea known from a single species, T. australis, from the Early Cretaceous (Aptian) Koonwarra Fossil Bed of Victoria, Australia, it is the only member of the family Tarwiniidae, and the only stem-group flea known from the Southern Hemisphere.
