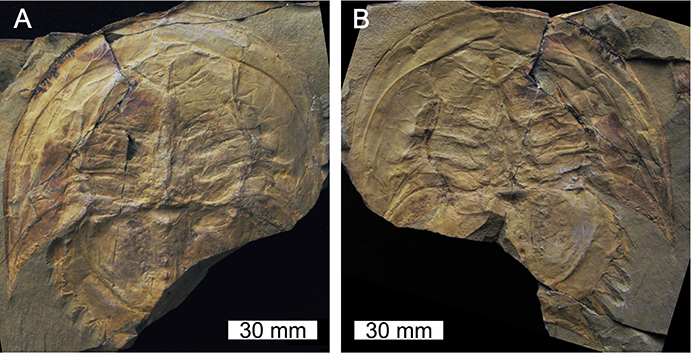

Scientific classification
- Kingdom: Animalia
- Phylum: Arthropoda
- Subphylum: Chelicerata
- Order: Xiphosura
- Family: Limulidae
- Genus: †Victalimulus; Riek & Gill, 1971
- Species: †V. mcqueeni

Binomial name
- †Victalimulus mcqueeni Riek & Gill, 1971

= Victalimulus =

Victalimulus Temporal range: Aptian

Genus of horseshoe crab relatives

Victalimulus mcqueeni is an extinct horseshoe crab, from Early Cretaceous (Aptian) Koonwarra Fossil Bed in eastern Victoria, Australia. The holotype and only known specimen was discovered by James McQueen who was encouraged by Leon Costermans to take it to the Museum of Victoria. Unlike modern species of horseshoe crab, it was likely native to freshwater as the Koonwarra Fossil Beds was, during the Aptian epoch, a freshwater lake.
