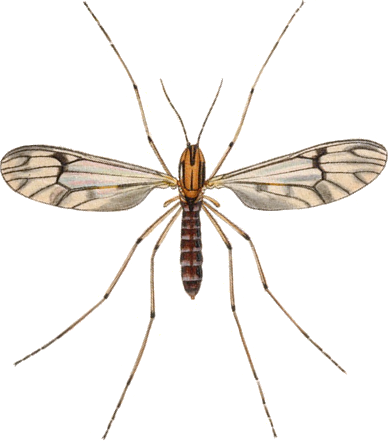
- Dixa nebulosa

Scientific classification
- Kingdom: Animalia
- Phylum: Arthropoda
- Clade: Pancrustacea
- Class: Insecta
- Order: Diptera
- Superfamily: Culicoidea
- Family: Dixidae; Schiffner, 1868

Genera
- Asiodixa Papp, 2006; Dixa Meigen, 1818; Dixella Dyar & Shannon, 1924; Meringodixa Nowell, 1951; Mesodixa; Metadixa; Neodixa; Nothodixa

= Dixidae =

Dixidae Temporal range: Early Jurassic–Recent

Family of flies

The Dixidae (meniscus midges) are a small family of aquatic nematoceran flies (Diptera) of less than 200 species. The larvae live in unpolluted, standing fresh waters, just beneath the surface film, usually amongst marginal aquatic vegetation. They are found in all continents except Antarctica.

== Description ==
Wing venation

Dixidae are small (body length not more than 5.0 mm) slender gnats with thin legs. Adults are black to yellowish-brown. The head is relatively broad. The antennae are thin and the flagellum has 14 segments. The proboscis is short and thick and the palpi are five-segmented. The thorax is slightly convex. The wing veins are without scales (with scales in the closely related family Culicidae). The subcosta is fused with the costa at the level of the base of Rs or slightly proximal to this. The wing venation exhibits radial, medial, and cubital forks (R 4 branched, M 2 branched, Cu 2 branched). R 2+ 3 is strongly arched, the r–m crossvein is distinct, and the discal cell is absent. The anal vein of the wing is long. The genitalia of the male is inverted at 180° by torsion of segments 5–8.

== Ecology ==
Adults typically remain close to the aquatic habitats where their larvae develop and are therefore infrequently observed. The larvae are easily recognized by their distinctive U-shaped resting posture, comparatively long antennae, prolegs positioned near the middle of the abdomen, and a prominent posterior spiracular plate. They occupy the margins of slow-moving or still water, where they can be dislodged into open water by minor disturbances such as splashing. When displaced, the larvae move along the water surface by flexing their bodies in quick undulating motions. Their feeding behavior resembles that of Anopheles mosquito larvae, as they draw in the surface film through their mouthparts and filter organic particles from it for nourishment.

== Evolutionary history ==
The oldest known fossils of the group come from the Jurassic of Asia, assigned to the extinct genera Syndixa and Eucorethrina, members of modern genera are not known until the Eocene.
