= Phylogeny of Malacostraca =

Evolutionary relationships of a class of crustaceans

Phylogeny of Malacostraca is the evolutionary relationships of the largest of the six classes of crustaceans, containing about 40,000 living species, divided among 16 orders. Its members display a great diversity of body forms. Although the class Malacostraca is united by a number of well-defined and documented features, which were recognised a century ago by William Thomas Calman in 1904, the phylogenetic relationship (the evolutionary tree) of the orders which compose this class is unclear due to the vast diversity present in their morphology. Molecular studies have attempted to infer the phylogeny of this clade, resulting in phylogenies which have a limited amount of morphological support. To resolve a well-supported eumalacostracan phylogeny and obtain a robust tree, it will be necessary to look beyond the most commonly utilized sources of data (nuclear ribosomal and mitochondrial sequences).

== Features ==
The Malacostraca is assumed to be monophyletic due to several common morphological traits which are present throughout the group and due to molecular studies that have also confirmed it.

William T. Calman in 1904 and 1909 described these common morphological features and introduced the major taxonomic subdivisions of the Malacostraca which are still in use today: he divided the Malacostraca in two subclasses the Phyllocarida and the Eumalacostraca, which is further subdivided into four superorders: Eucarida, Peracarida, Hoplocarida and Syncarida.

W.T. Calman coined the term caridoid facies for the common eumalacostracan (shrimp-like) features; the most important of these is the constant number of segments in each tagma: members of this class have five segments in the cephalon, eight thoracic segments (thoracomeres) and six segments in the pleon and possess a telson, which forms a characteristic tail fan when the uropods are present. Many other characteristic features are present but their presence varies amongst lineages; one notable ancestral feature which varies is the carapace, which may be absent, reduced or well developed covering the whole cephalothorax. Furthermore, Richter, S., & Scholtz, G. (2001) list five separate unique eumalacostracan features which taken together form a strong argument in favour of the monophyly of the Eumalacostraca.

However debate arises in the relationship between the subdivisions of the Malacostraca, due to the presence of several contrasting features.

Phylogenetic trees from several published studies. The first six were obtained via morphological data whereas the last three were obtained with molecular data using a GTR+Γ+I model (General time reversible + gamma distribution + independent frequencies). (Adapted from Spear et al., 2005)

== The traditional basal malacostracans ==
Diagram of Nebalia bipes showing the major features of the external anatomy: 1: antennule; 2: rostrum; 3: carapace; 4: abdomen / pleon; 5: furca; 6: telson; 7: pleopods; 8: antenna; 9: thoracopods; 10: eye

The Phyllocarida is a group of about 36 small marine species that are distributed across planet and possess a characteristic large bivalve carapace and an elongated abdomen with no uropods. This group is believed to be the most primitive malacostracan group, because they lack some of the caridoid facies, such as the presence of seven abdominal segments (eight if telson is included). Furthermore, one study by Wills places them as a sister branch to the Cephalocarida and basal to a Maxillopoda + Eumalacostraca clade and therefore making the Malacostraca paraphyletic.

The Eumalacostraca — the malacostraca minus the phyllocarida — were subdivided on the basis of several features, although which group is basal is unclear. Several authors, such as Siewin (1963), believe that the Syncarida is the most basal group due to the absence of morphological traits that are present in the remaining eumalacostracans; in addition, the Syncarida are distributed worldwide in reclusive habitats such as interstitial and groundwater, whereas their extensive fossil record shows that they were once marine, implying that the species present today are remnants of a more abundant group.
A second problematic group often attributed to be basal in the Eumalacostraca clade is the Hoplocarida. This group is composed of 200 species commonly called mantis shrimps, which are found in shallow tropical and subtropical marine habitats that have adapted to a predatorial life thanks to their specialized large second pair of thoracopods (thoracic appendices), raptorial legs, which are used to capture prey, in fact their name is a combination of Greek words meaning "armed shrimp". Its precise location amongst the Malacostraca is unclear and has been proposed to be a sister group to the remaining eumalacostracans due to its ancient fossil record but it has also been placed either sister to the Eucarida or even inside the Eucarida by molecular studies.

In fact, the Malacostracan has a well-documented fossil record, that, although patchy or missing entirely (ghost lineage) for certain clades, offer a unique opportunity to analyse the morphology of the ancestral taxa of a clade or a dead-end sister taxa (plesion), whose age (determined by its stratigraphy) gives an estimate of how long has a group been around. However, the major limitation to fossilized samples is that typically the soft parts do not fossilize and are therefore lost, as a consequence a much more limited amount of information that can be gathered. Furthermore, some taxa may not fossilize well, and therefore leave no trace even though they existed, when this occurs in the fossil record, the period where the taxa are expected to appear is called a ghost range.

== Eucarida ==
Eucarida is a diverse and abundant group, whose members have a carapace which is fused to the thoracic segments to form a cephalothorax. The Eucarida is divided into three orders, the Euphausiacea, the Decapoda and the Amphionidacea.
The members of the Euphausiacea are commonly called krill and are all marine shrimp-like species whose pleopods (abdominal appendages) function as swimmerets, they swarm and mostly feed on plankton, this group is composed of only 90 species, but some of these are one of the most abundant species on the planet, in fact, it is estimated that the biomass of the Antarctic krill Euphausia superba is 500 million tons.

The Decapoda is a group with 18,000 species which have 5 pairs of thoracopods and a well-developed carapace that covers the gills (which are exposed in krill). Many of these species have common names and are often eaten. The decapods are further subdivided on the basis of the gill structure into two suborders Dendrobranchiata (prawns) and Pleocyemata, which is further subdivided into several infraorders, such as the Caridea ("true shrimp"), the Stenopodidea (boxer shrimp) and the Anomura and the Brachyura (crabs) and so forth. In addition, there is an enigmatic eucarid species, Amphionides reynaudii, which is the sole representative of its order, but due to the loss of several features resulting from its small size, its classification has been unclear.

== Peracarida ==
The other major malacostracan superorder, the Peracarida, is highly diverse in habit, size and shape and contains 21,500 species, but this number is a gross underestimate as the number of described species has tripled in the past 20 years. Most authors studying morphological characters propose a monophyletic Peracarida which forms a well supported subtree that is sister to a Eucarida subtree, one paper is an exception and proposes that the Peracarida is derived from a polyphyletic Eucarida.
With the exception of thermosbaenacean species, a characteristic of the members of this group is that they brood their young in a marsupium formed by branches (endites) of their thoracopods, called oostegites. The Peracarida is divided into nine orders (Isopoda, Amphipoda, Mysida, Lophogastrida, Cumacea, Tanaidacea, Mictacea, Thermosbaenacea and Spelaeogriphacea), although some authors prefer to unite two pairs of orders with similar organisms, which are the Mysidacea, formed by the Mysida and the Lophogastrida, and the Edriophthalma, formed by the Isopoda and the Amphipoda.

The members of the Mysida and the Lophogastrida have several common features: they are shrimp-like with compound stalked eyes and have a carapace which covers most of the thorax but does not fuse with the last four thoracic segments (as instead is seen in the Eucarida), they possess well-developed thoracopods (for swimming) and tail fan, they also have similar behaviour (swarming) and foregut structure; Pygocephalomorph, a fossil from the Permian, appears similar to the Lophogastrida, which in addition to other factors, has traditionally allowed the Lophogastrida to be identified as the more primitive Mysidacea. However, the monophyly of the Mysidacea been disputed, due to molecular data and several differences, one profound difference between the two taxa is that in the Mysida the carapace acts as a respiratory surface due to the absence of gills, which are however present in the Lophogastrida. When they are considered together many authors have put Mysidacea basal to the remaining peracarids ((paraphyletic)Ruppert & Barnes, 1994; (monophyletic)), others have even either grouped them with Euphausiacea to form the Schizopoda or made them basal to a eucarid subtree (paraphyletic).

The Isopoda and the Amphipoda are two of the largest pericarid groups, they both lack a carapace, possess sessile compound eyes and lack a sharp demarcation between thoracic and abdominal segments, but however differ in several features, such as gills.
Isopoda contains 10,000 species, the organisms are dorsoventrally flattened and occupy not only marine and freshwater habitats, but even terrestrial (woodlice) for which they developed a thickened cuticle and gas exchange organs, allowing them to live even in arid regions.

Amphipoda is a highly diverse group of 8,000 species, ranging from the Caprellida with a long and narrow body shape (skeleton shrimp) to the shrimp-like Gammaridea (scuds and sand hoppers).
The position of the Isopoda and the Amphipoda amongst the Peracarida is also debated, some authors support a derived united group (Edriophthalma) which is either monophyletic or paraphyletic (Wheeler, 1998), others support a basal paraphyletic Isopoda and Amphipoda group (Watling, 1999); however, other authors believe that several features that unite the Isopoda and the Amphipoda are homoplasious and that the two groups reside with different groups: one proposed a basal Amphipoda to a clade formed from Isopoda + Tanaidacea and Cumacea + Mictacea + Speleogriphacea, while some older phylogenetic trees place the Amphipoda and the Mysidacea basal to the Peracarida (without the Thermosbaenacea) either as a polyphyletic or a monophyletic group, whereas the Isopoda are in a derived clade with Tanaidacea.

Molecular studies by Jarman et al. (2000), Spears et al. (2005) and Meland & Willassen (2007) (which was derived from Spears et al. (2005) by adding 22 mysidacean taxa to those 26 taxa) suggest a phylogeny with some elements similar to that proposed by Richter & Scholtz (2001), but disprove the monophyly of both the Edriophthalma and the Mysidacea and do not possess a basal eumalacostracan taxa or a basal peracarid taxa (the Hoplocarida and the Syncarida, respectively in): The Amphipoda (with Spleogriphacea) form a clade with the Lophogastrida, the Isopoda are in a derived clade with the Cumacea and Tanaidacea, while most importantly the Mysida in all three analyses falls basal to the non-Peracarida subtree, which however has a limited morphological support (Poore, 2005).

The remaining Peracarida orders are the cryptic and either moderately abundant, Cumacea and Tanaidacea, or are extremely rare and relictual, Mictacea, Spelaeogriphacea, and Thermosbaenacea.

There are about 1,600 members of the Cumacea, these are small burrowing crustaceans which have a characteristic large bulbous carapace (covering three thoracic segments) and an elongated abdomen which finishes in a pleotelson with stylus-like uropods, in fact due to their peculiar shape they are sometimes called hooded shrimp. Tanaidacea is a group of 1,500 species which are small burrowing or tube-dwelling crustaceans with a short carapace (covering two thoracic segments) that possess a pair of chelate second thoracopods (gnathopods).

Only three extant and two fossil speleogriphacean species have been found, these are blind cave-dwelling species with a short carapace (one thoracic segment); while the Mictacea is a group erected only two decades ago, and to date, five species have been found, Mictocaris halope (cave dwelling) and four species in the family Hursutiidae, in the genera Hirsutia (at 1,000 meter depths) and Thetispelecaris (submarine caves), these blind species lack a carapace but have a well-developed headshield, and have reduced pleopods. This enigmatic group is believed by some authors not to be monophyletic, in fact one author proposed that Mictocaris halope should be grouped with the Spelaeogriphacea, forming the Cosinzeneacea.

The Thermosbaenacea are a group of 11 species found in hot springs, caves and groundwater that has the peculiarity that its brooding pouch is formed by its extended carapace and not by modified thoracopod endites as occurs in the remaining peracarids, for this reason some authors have removed this group from the Peracarida and placed it in its own superorder, the Pancarida, basal to the Pericarida.

== Molecular studies ==
The major feature that emerges from the picture of the phylogeny of the Malacostraca is that their diversity has resulted in several studies proposing dramatically different phylogenetic trees. With the advent of DNA sequencing, molecular studies have not helped a particular evolutionary model based on morphology to become the accepted one, but rather they have added more uncertainty to the accepted phylogenetic relationships: in fact not only they contradicted several morphological studies, but they also questioned the monophyly of the Eucarida and the Peracarida, in particular regarding the positions of the Mysida the Syncarida and the Hoplocarida, furthermore there is some overlap between molecular studies concentrated on the Peracarida, while another uses a limited amount of taxa.

== Cladogram ==
The following cladogram is based on the 2001 phylogenetic analysis of Richter & Scholtz.

- Malacostraca
  - Phyllocarida
  - - Hoplocarida
    - Eumalacostraca
      - - Decapoda
        - Amphionidacea
      - - Syncarida
          - Anaspidacea
          - Bathynellacea
        - - Euphausiacea
          - Peracarida
            - Thermosbaenacea
            - - - Mysida
                - Lophogastrida
              - - - Spelaeogriphacea
                  - Mictacea
                - - Cumacea
                  - - Tanaidacea
                    - Isopoda

The next cladogram follows a 2023 revision of pancrustacean phylogeny based on molecular data.

- - Thecostraca
  - Malacostraca
    - Phyllocarida
    - - Peracarida
      - Stomatocarida
        - Hoplocarida
        - Syneucarida
          - Bathynellacea
          - - - Anaspidacea
              - Euphausiacea
            - Decapoda
