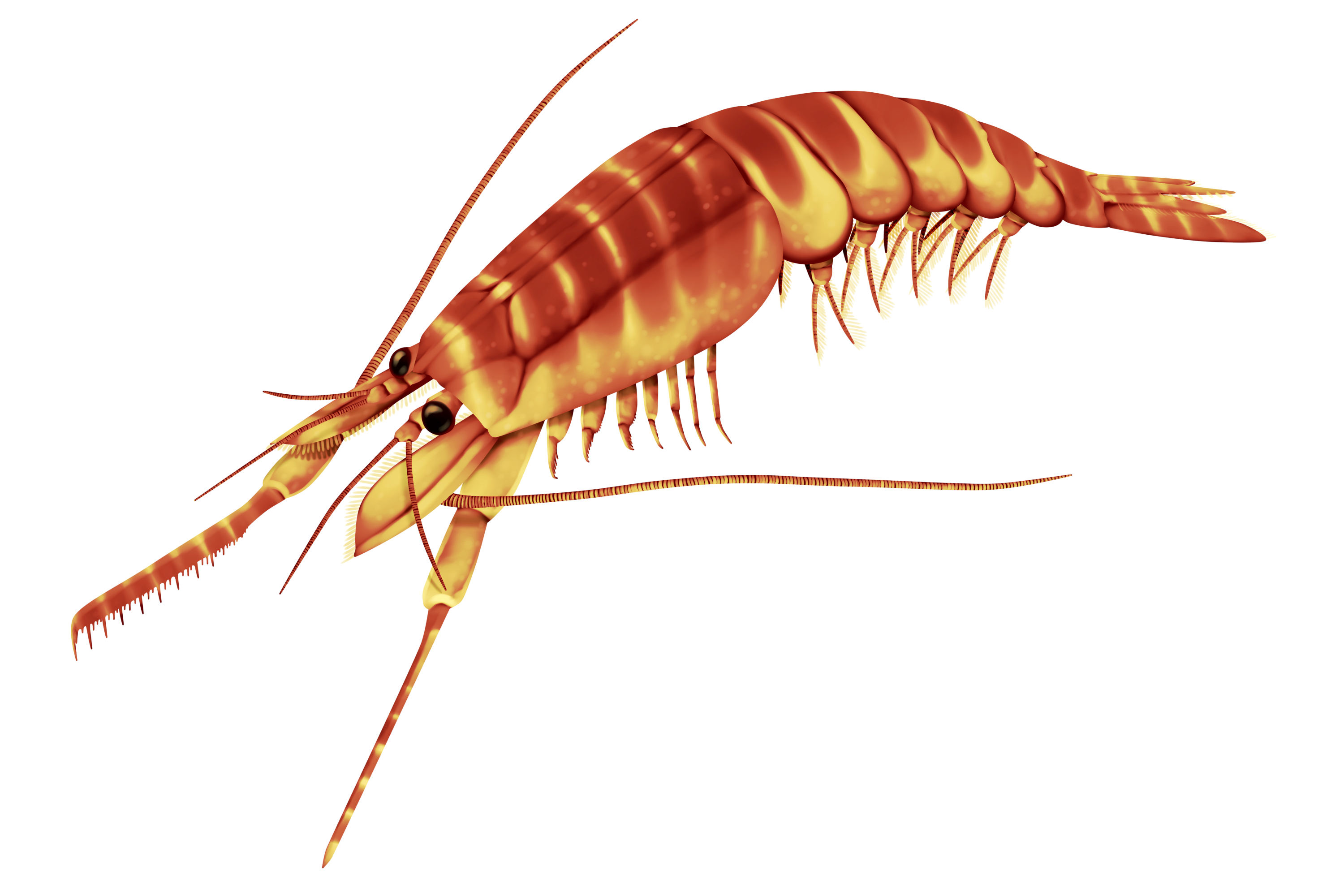
- Life restoration of A. seriatus
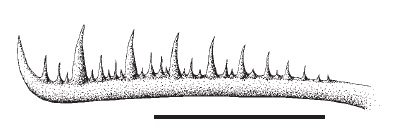
- Appendage of A. seriatus

Scientific classification
- Kingdom: Animalia
- Phylum: Arthropoda
- Clade: Pancrustacea
- Class: Malacostraca
- Order: †Angustidontida
- Family: †Angustidontidae
- Genus: †Angustidontus; Cooper, 1936

Type species
- †Angustidontus seriatus Cooper, 1936

Synonyms
- Angustidontus gracilis Cooper, 1936; Angustidontus weihmannae Copeland & Bolton, 1960; Angustidontus moravicus Chlupáč, 1978

= Angustidontus =

Angustidontus Temporal range: Frasnian–Early Carboniferous, 380–340 Ma

Extinct genus of crustaceans

Angustidontus ("narrow tooth") is a genus of predatory crustaceans from the Late Devonian and Early Carboniferous periods, classified as part of the subclass Eumalacostraca. Fossils of the genus have been recovered in relative abundance from Canada, Germany, the Czech Republic, Poland, Belarus, Ukraine and large parts of the United States, including Oklahoma, Ohio, Indiana, Kentucky, Montana, Utah, Nevada.

The major eumalacostracan lineages had already diverged from each other during the Devonian, but their early evolutionary history remains relatively unknown due to a poor fossil record, making fossils of Angustidontus and other early eumalacostracans important for scientific study. Historically of uncertain classification, studies on the paleobiology of Angustidontus have allowed researchers to place it between the eumalacostracan orders Amphionidacea and Decapoda.

== Description ==
Angustidontus was a predatory angustidontid crustacean, measuring about 6 centimetres (2.4 inches) in length (9 cm, 3.5 in if the large maxillipeds, that is, appendages or "limbs" used for feeding, are counted). It had one pair of grasping maxillipeds and seven pairs of pereiopods (appendages that acted primarily as walking legs). The first to fifth pair of pereiopods were subchelate (grasping, pincer-like) and short, ending in a hooked and enlarged dactylus (final leg segment, "tip"). The sixth and seventh pairs were thinner and longer, ending in simpler and smaller dactyli. The fifth and sixth pleonal (of the pleon, the abdomen) somites (body segments) expanded laterally, with some partial overlap over the telson (the posteriormost division of the body).

Angustidontus had large grasping appendages, modified from the first or second thoracopods (appendages attached to the thorax), which represent some of the earliest maxillipeds within the Eucarida. These maxillipeds were likely used through being folded downwards to strike at prey, then hold the prey and prevent it from wriggling itself free. Schramidontus, the only known close relative of Angustidontus, also possessed a second smaller pair of maxillipeds that it could use to bring prey to the maxillae, maxillulae (similar structures preceding the maxillae) and its large mandibles, but these are absent in Angustidontus. Instead, Angustidontus used the next four pairs of thoracopods (which were short and possessed strong claws and serrated gnathobases, that is, modified and expanded bases to aid feeding) to tear apart prey and transport it to the mouth.

== History of research ==
The genus Angustidontus was named by American geologist Chalmer Lewis Cooper in 1936, together with the family "Angustidontidae". Cooper described the fossils, consisting of the serrated appendages, as fossil jaws of actinopterygian fish. Since then, the appendages of Angustidontus have been the subject of much debate on its classification. In the 1950s, it was suggested that the fossils instead represented chelicerae of eurypterids, possibly of something closely related to Pterygotus.

In 1960, Canadian geologists Murray John Copeland and Thomas Edward Bolton considered the fossils to instead represent gill rakers of fish or be "claws similar to those on the second maxilliped of the stomatopod Squilla"; furthermore, the appendage was noticed to have had some kind of "ball and socket" joint type of articulation. Though it was noted by several prominent researchers that Angustidontus did not likely represent a eurypterid, it was treated as such, albeit with reservations, by most subsequent authors. Exceptions were American geologist Jean Milton Berdan, who concluded in 1964, after studying multiple Angustidontus appendages, that the "rami of Angustidontus are almost certainly part of an arthropod rather than a vertebrate but are not necessarily part of a eurypterid"; and Norwegian paleontologist and geologist Leif Størmer, who agreed in 1966 that the fossils were not eurypterid, but that they "were of uncertain affinity, possibly decapod crustaceans".

Angustidontus often occurs together with Concavicaris, another Devonian crustacean. Concavicaris fossils tend to lack the appendages, whilst Angustidontus fossils often lack the cephalothoracic shield because of its weak sclerotisation. This caused some confusion, and some researchers have suggested that the two would represent different parts of the same animal. Expeditions to fossil localities in Nevada where Concavicaris and Angustidontus were reported to have occurred together by Cooper in 1936 yielded more information on the appendages of Concavicaris and allowed it to be determined that the appendages of Angustidontus did not represent appendages of Concavicaris. With hundreds of specimens being collected, proper research could be conducted on Angustidontus for the first time with the discovery of the first complete specimens.

The new specimens allowed researchers to determine that Angustidontus was a peracarid malacostracan crustacean, and that Concavicaris simply represented a separate animal that was part of a larger Late Devonian fauna including a large amount of different invertebrates, such as worms, cephalopods, bivalves, brachipods and sponges. The appendages which had caused confusion in the past were revealed to be the first thoracopods, but greatly elongated and adapted to be used in feeding.

== Classification ==
A generalized bauplan of a malacostracan crustacean. The cephalon and thorax was fused in Angustidontus as a single cephalothoracic shield and the first thoracopod had developed into a maxilliped.

Angustidontus is classified as part of the extinct family Angustidontidae together with the freshwater genus Schramidontus from Belgium. This family is the only classified as part of the eucarid order Angustidontida. Angustidontids are diagnosed as eucarids that possess carapaces and stalked eyes with scale-like exopods (the external branch of the two comprising a biramous appendage) on the second antennae, an elongated pleion and a tail fan. These features make the group distinct from most eumalacostracan crustaceans and they are classified as part of the Eucarida due to their carapace being fused to thoracic segments 1–7.

Some additional species of Angustidontus other than the type species A. seriatus were previously named. These were A. gracilis (Cooper, 1936), A. moravicus (Chlupáč, 1978) and A. weihmannae (Copeland & Bolton, 1960), which were separated from each other by the pattern of the teeth on their maxillipeds. They were all considered synonymous with A. seriatus by British and Polish paleontologists William David Ian Rolfe and Jerzy Dzik in 2006 as fossils of these species presented highly variable patterns. Rolfe and Dzik determined that tooth pattern was not a valid criterion for distinguishing species, with only the type species A. seriatus remaining as valid. Still, based on the morphology of different fossil mandibles, fossil material from the Early Famennian of Poland may represent two possible additional species.

The cladogram below is based on the relationships of the Eucarida assumed by French paleontologists Pierre Guériau, Sylvain Charbonnier and Gaël Clément in 2014, based on the gradual modification of the first thoracopods into the maxillipeds seen in Decapoda.

- Eucarida
  - Euphausiacea
  - - Amphionidacea
    - - †Angustidontida
        - †Angustidontus
        - †Schramidontus
      - Decapoda

== Paleoecology ==
=== Environment ===
The life environment of Angustidontus was low in diversity, but might have been very high in biological productivity. Fossil animals found in association with Angustidontus are exclusively open sea pelagic creatures, such as conodonts, cephalopods, ostracods, concavicarids and fish. The bottom regions were likely slightly benthose with a soft and muddy environment; the latter was likely anaerobic and poisonous, with abundant hydrogen sulfide, which would have prevented decomposition and allowed for fossils to be preserved.

Concavicarids, pelagic crustaceans of uncertain classification found in association with Angustidontus, also had chelicerae-like appendages and were covered in protective spines. They were predators, with known stomach contents including cephalopod remains as well as shark and teleost fish vertebrae. The appendages of concavicarids like Concavicaris differed in functionality from those of Angustiodontus and were thus likely used to catch other kinds of prey than what was eaten by Angustidontus. Concavicarids may not only have occupied a different niche, but an entirely different level in the water column.

=== Prey ===
There are no taxonomically identifiable gut contents in any Angustidontus specimen. There are some known small fossil pieces found in association to Angustidontus specimens that may represent cephalopod jaws or conches of thin-shelled molluscs. The specimen NMNH 530451 preserves a spiral imprint that might represent the larval conch of a goniatite. Angustidontus might thus have fed on cephalopods. Another likely prey item based on its presence in Late Devonian pelagic environments are conodonts.

== See also ==
- Pseudoangustidontus ("false Angustidontus"), a genus of radiodont
