= Schramidontus =

Schramidontus Temporal range: Famennian, 358.9–372.2 Ma

Scientific classification
- Kingdom: Animalia
- Phylum: Arthropoda
- Clade: Pancrustacea
- Class: Malacostraca
- Order: †Angustidontida
- Family: †Angustidontidae
- Genus: †Schramidontus; Gueriau, Charbonnier & Clément, 2014

Type species
- †Schramidontus labensis Gueriau, Charbonnier & Clément, 2014

Extinct genus of crustaceans

Schramidontus is a genus of crustaceans from the Late Devonian period found in Strud, Belgium, closely related to Angustidontus and classified as part of the order Angustidontida. It is an important genus because of its position in the eumalacostracan family tree and the insight study of the genus may give of the origin of the Decapoda. The generic name derives from Frederick Schram, who helped the scientific community in the field of the Palaeozoic malacostracans and the suffix -idontus in relation to the similarities between Schramidontus and Angustidontus. The specific name is from Labas, a stream that flows near Strud quarry, where the genus was discovered.

== Description ==
Schramidontus had a subcylindrical smooth carapace and a triangular telson. It had two pairs of grasping maxillipeds, the second being twice as big as the first, that it could use to bring prey to the maxillae, maxillulae and its large mandibles. This feature was not present in its only close relative, Angustidontus, which probably used its maxillipeds to hit and hold its prey. In addition, Schramidontus had six pairs of pereiopods. The first five were subchelated, short and ending in a hooked dactylus, and the last pair was shorter and narrower with a small simple dactylus.

== Classification ==
Schramidontus is classified as part of the extinct family Angustidontidae together with the pelagic genus Angustidontus from Europe and North America. This family is the only family classified as part of the eucarid order Angustidontida. Angustidontids are diagnosed as eucarids that possess carapaces and stalked eyes with "scale-like exopods" on the second antennae, an elongated pleion and a tail fan. These features make the group distinct from most eumalacostracan crustaceans and they are classified as part of the Eucarida due to their carapace being fused to thoracic segments 1-7.

The cladogram below is based on the relationships of the Eucarida assumed by Gueriau, Charbonnier and Clément (2014), based on the gradual modification of the first thoracopods into the maxillipeds seen in the Decapoda.

- Eucarida
  - Euphausiacea
  - - Amphionidacea
    - - †Angustidontida
        - †Angustidontus
        - †Schramidontus
      - Decapoda

== Paleoecology ==
The small quarry of Strud in which Schramidontus was found has no evidence of marine influence, but it suggests a continental environment. In these deposits fossil remains have been found of several animals such as tetrapods and a fauna of well-preserved freshwater crustaceans, including decapods, conchostracans, notostracans and anostracans. There is also evidence of fossil remains of plants such as early seed-plants. The Belgian angustidontids can be recognized as early continental eumalacostracans, probably freshwater. Schramidontus was found in a continental environment, and although this represents the first documentation of continental angustidontids, it differs from the marine environment in which Angustidontus is usually found.

The first two pairs thoracopods are inserted laterally in the mouth. Several factors such as the size and articulation of the three endopodal articles suggest that these thoracopods were able to bring prey to the maxillae, maxillulae and its large mandibles. In addition, the spiny occlusal margins of their dactyli suggest that the genus was fed by filtration. Therefore, these thoracopods are considered to be maxillipeds.
