= Tulumella =

Scientific classification
- Domain: Eukaryota
- Kingdom: Animalia
- Phylum: Arthropoda
- Class: Malacostraca
- Order: Thermosbaenacea
- Family: Tulumellidae
- Genus: Tulumella; Bowman & Iliffe, 1988

Genus of crustaceans

Tulumella is a genus of crustaceans belonging to the monotypic family Tulumellidae.

The species of this genus are found in Central America.

Species:

- Tulumella bahamensis Yager, 1988
- Tulumella grandis Yager, 1988
- Tulumella unidens Bowman & Iliffe, 1988
