= Acadiocaris =

Acadiocaris Temporal range: Early Carboniferous

Scientific classification
- Kingdom: Animalia
- Phylum: Arthropoda
- Class: Malacostraca
- Order: Spelaeogriphacea
- Family: †Acadiocarididae
- Genus: †Acadiocaris; Brooks, 1962
- Species: †A. novascotica

Binomial name
- †Acadiocaris novascotica (Copeland, 1957)

Extinct genus of crustaceans

Acadiocaris is an extinct genus of malacostracan crustacean that existed in Canada during the Early Carboniferous. It was named by Copeland in 1957. It is the earliest known member of Spelaeogriphacea, which only has a handful of living species. Analysis of fossils shows that Acadiocaris retained a number of primitive morphological features compared to more modern spelaeogriphaceans: an optic notch was not developed under its rectangular carapace; thoracopodal endopods were elongated, and five pairs of well-developed but relatively small and simple pleopods.
