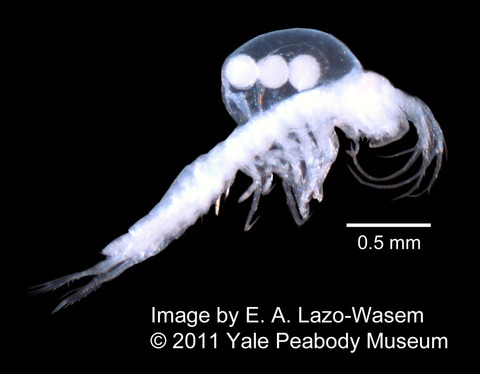
- Monodellidae

Scientific classification
- Domain: Eukaryota
- Kingdom: Animalia
- Phylum: Arthropoda
- Class: Malacostraca
- Order: Thermosbaenacea
- Family: Monodellidae; Taramelli, 1954

= Monodellidae =

Family of crustaceans

Monodellidae is a family of crustaceans belonging to the order Thermosbaenacea.

Genera:

- Monodella Ruffo, 1949
- Tethysbaena Wagner, 1994
