= Halosbaenidae =

Scientific classification
- Domain: Eukaryota
- Kingdom: Animalia
- Phylum: Arthropoda
- Class: Malacostraca
- Order: Thermosbaenacea
- Family: Halosbaenidae; Monod & Cals, 1988

Family of crustaceans

Halosbaenidae is a family of crustaceans belonging to the order Thermosbaenacea.

Genera:

- Halosbaena Stock, 1976
- Limnosbaena Stock, 1976
- Theosbaena Cals & Boutin, 1985
