= Cephalon (arthropod head) =

Head section of an arthropod

The cephalon is the head section of an arthropod. It is a tagma, i.e., a specialized grouping of arthropod segments. The word cephalon derives from the Greek κεφαλή (kephalē), meaning "head".

== Insects ==
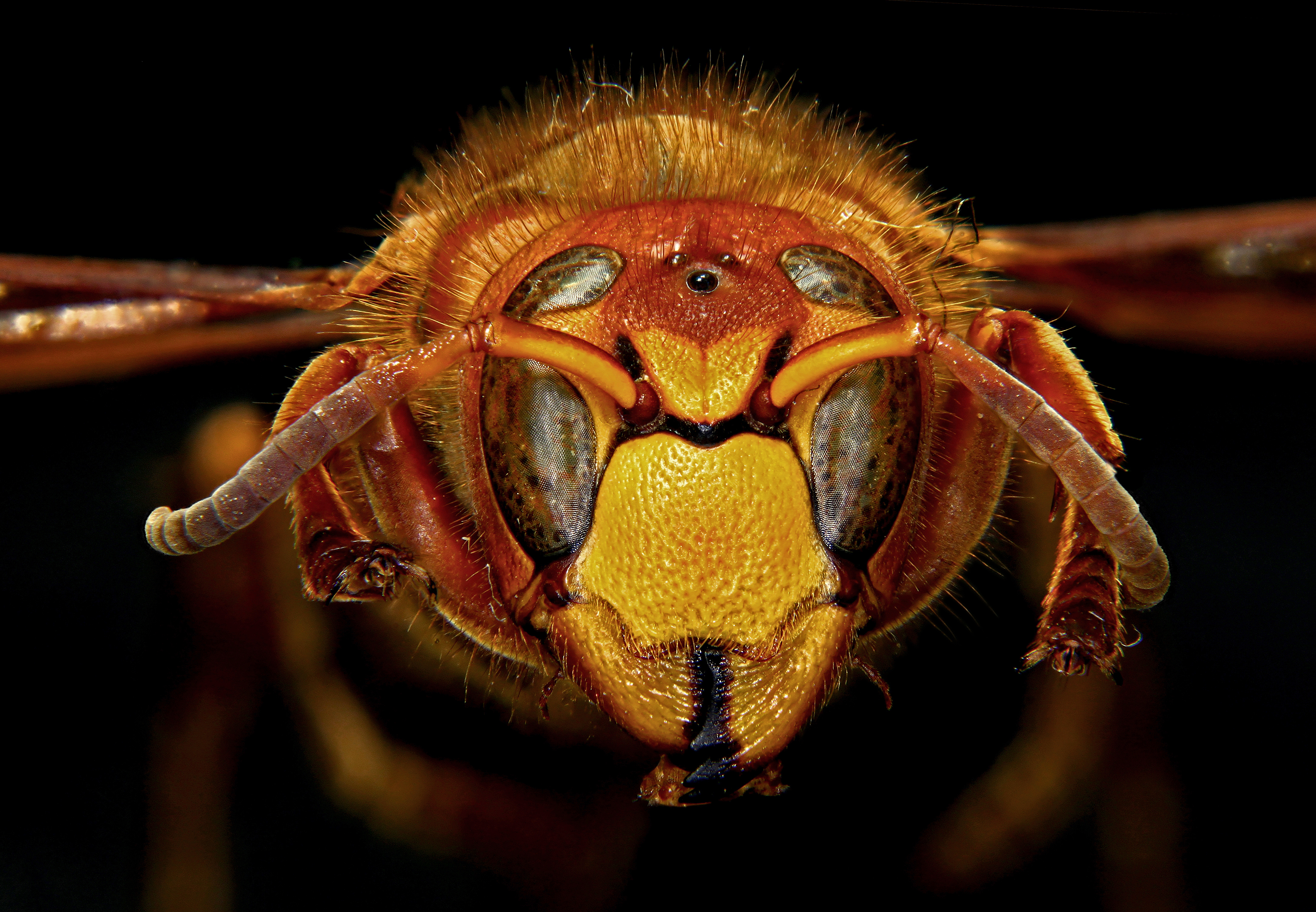
Head of a European hornet (Vespa crabro)

In insects, head is a preferred term. The insect head consists of five segments, including three (the labial, maxillary and mandibular) necessary for food uptake, which are altogether known as the gnathocephalon and house the suboesophageal ganglion of the brain, as well as the antennal segment, and an ocular segment, as well as a non segmented fused section of the head where the archicerebrum is housed known as the acron. See also arthropod head problem.

== Chelicerates and crustaceans ==
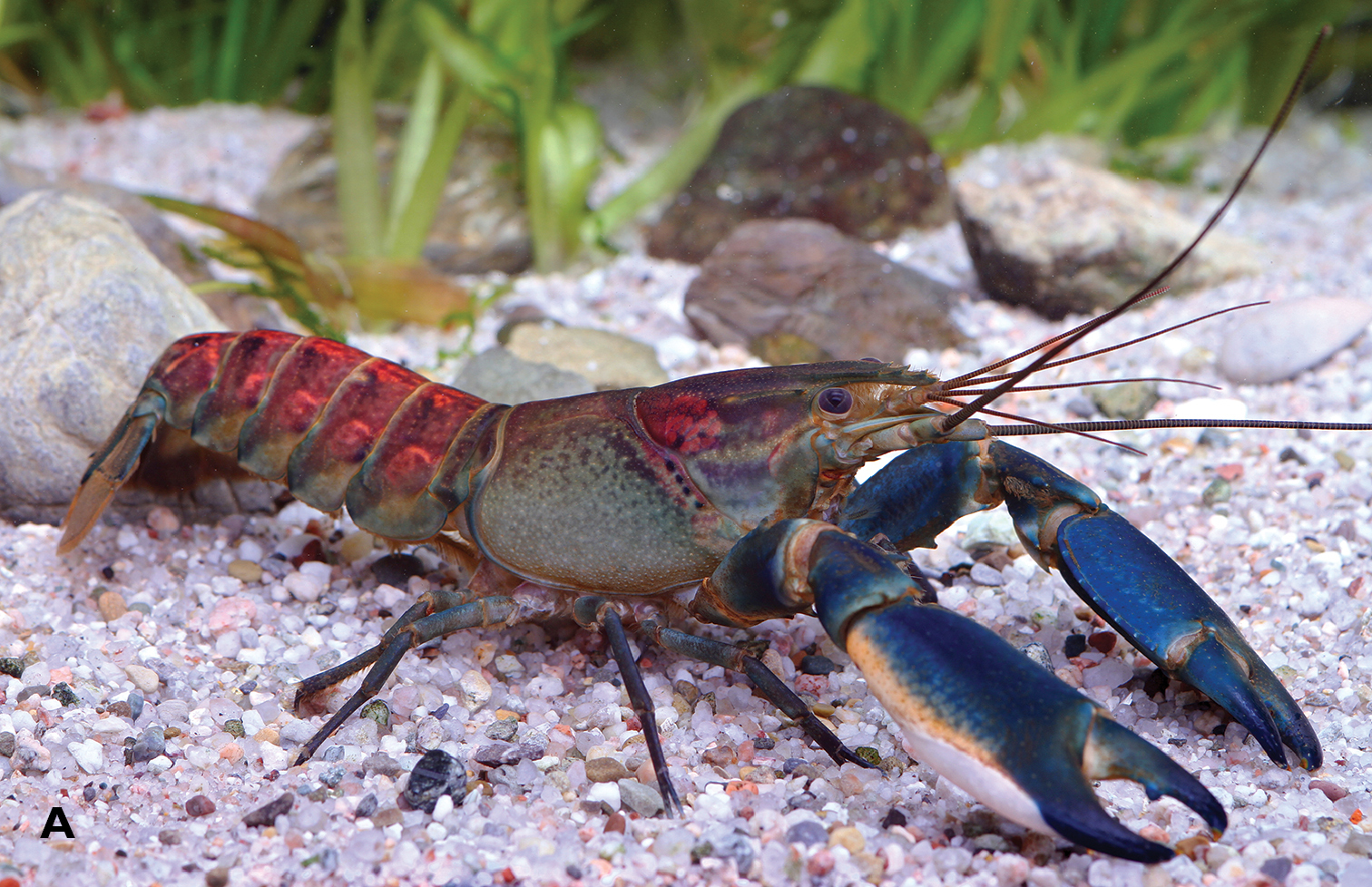
The crustacean Cherax warsamsonicus

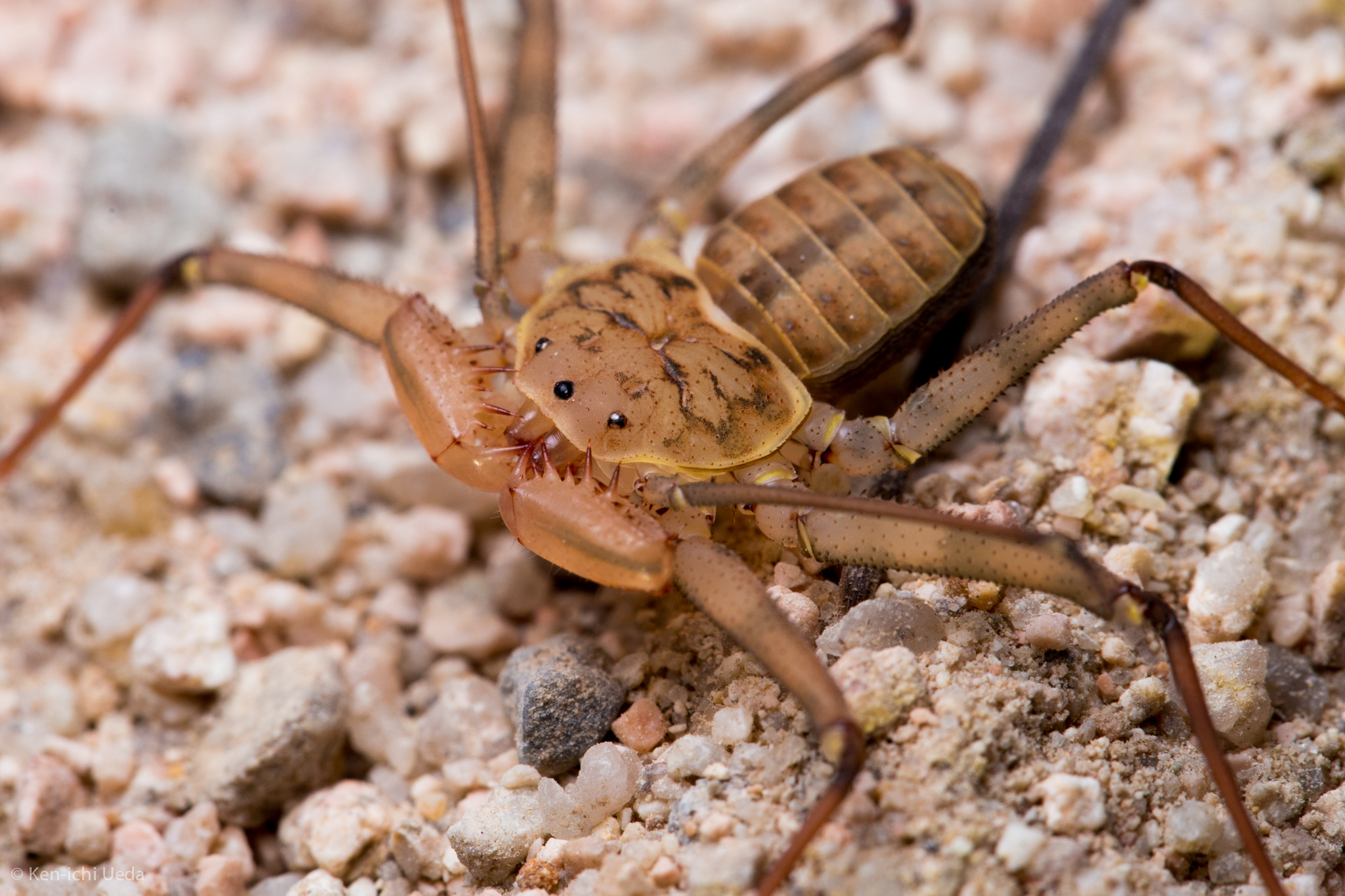
The amplypygid chelicerate Phrynus asperatipes

In chelicerates and crustaceans, the cephalothorax is derived from the fusion of the cephalon and the thorax, and is usually covered by a single unsegmented carapace. In relation with the arthropod head problem, phylogeny studies show that members of the Malacostraca class of crustaceans have five segments in the cephalon, when not fused with the thorax to form a cephalothorax.

== Proarticulata ==
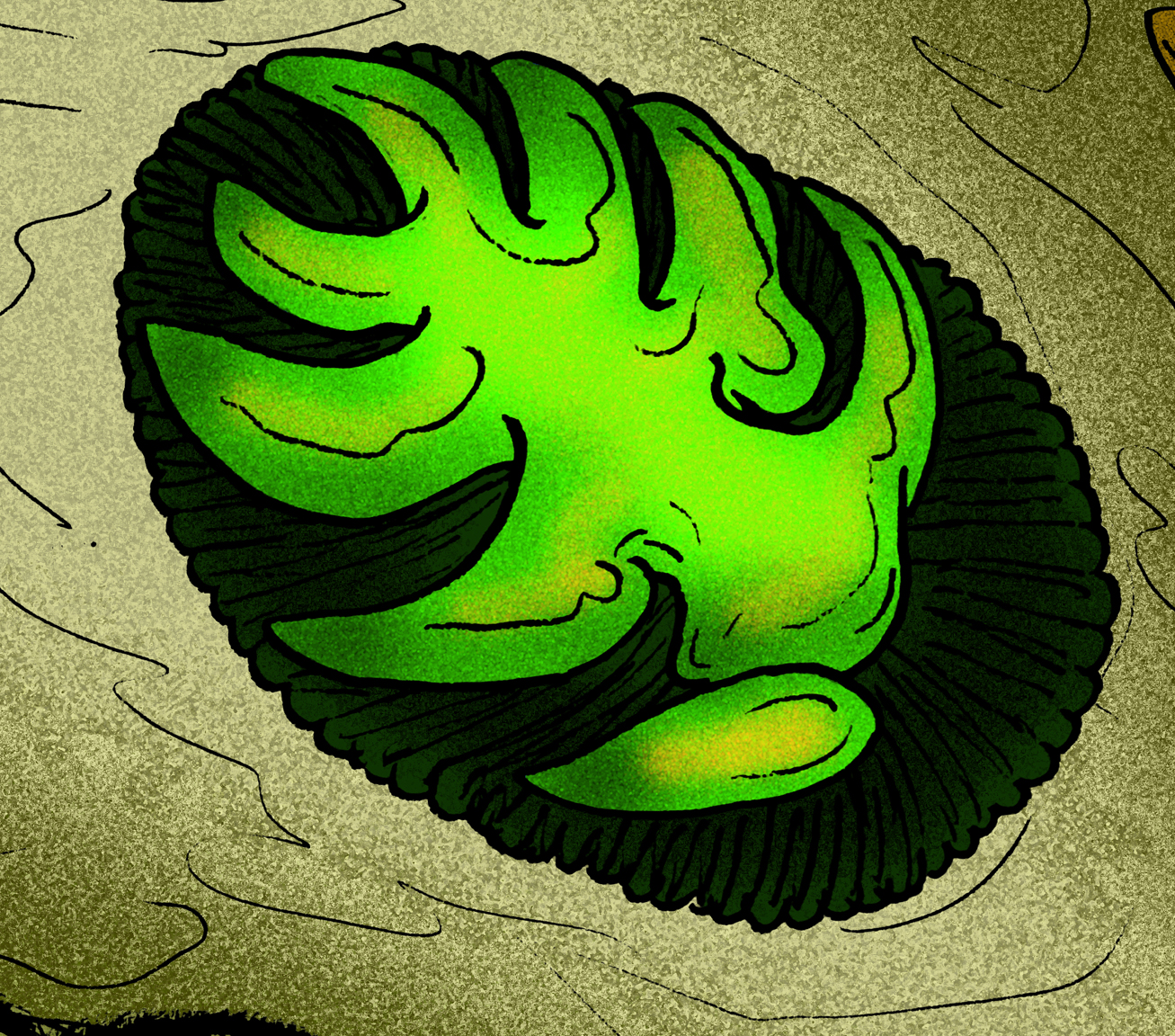
Praecambridium sigillum

In the Late Precambrian or Lower Cambrian Proarticulata species Praecambridium sigillum, that superficially resembles a trilobite, the term is also used to describe the anterior part of the animal.

== Thylacocephala ==
The head of the Thylacocephala is also referred to as a cephalon: the cephalon is usually obscured by the carapace. Thylacocephala are a unique group of extinct arthropods, with possible crustacean affinities, thought to occur from the lower Cambrian, but with certainty between the Lower Silurian and the Upper Cretaceous.

== Trilobites ==
The tagmata in a trilobite

Morphology of the Trilobite cephalon

1 – fixigena; 2 – librigena; 3 – glabella

1 – preocular area; 2 – palpebral area; 3 – postocular area; 4 – posterolateral projection; 5 – occipital ring; 6 – glabella; 7 – posterior area; 8 – lateral border; 9 – librigenal area; 10 – preglabellar area

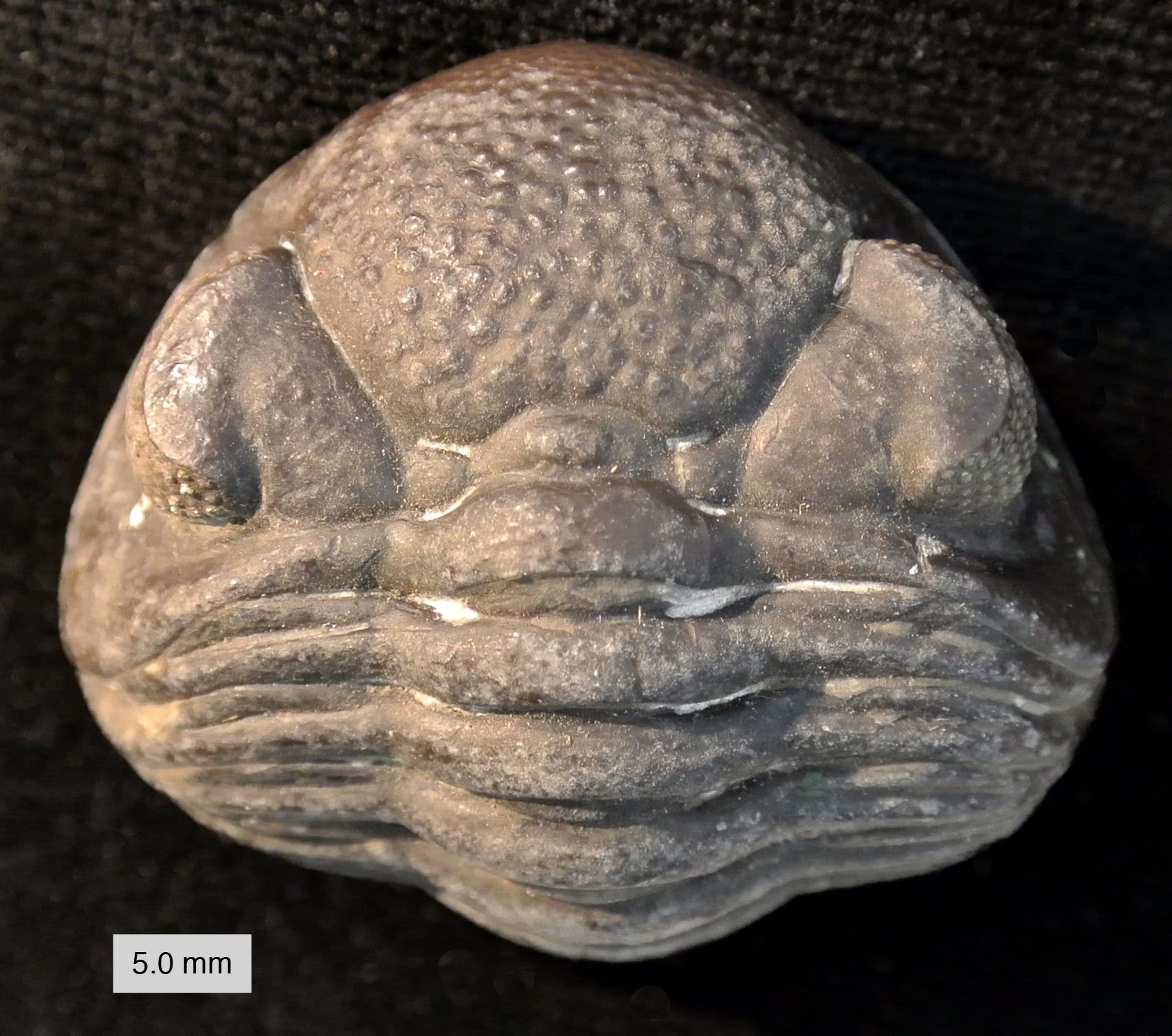
Cephalon of the trilobite Phacops rana from the Devonian of northwestern Ohio.

The cephalon of trilobites is highly variable with a lot of morphological complexity. The glabella, the expression of the axial lobe in the cephalon, forms a dome underneath which sat the "crop" or "stomach". Generally the exoskeleton has few distinguishing ventral features, but the cephalon often preserves muscle attachment scars and occasionally the hypostome, a small rigid plate comparable to the ventral plate in other arthropods. A toothless mouth and stomach sat upon the hypostome with the mouth facing backwards at the rear edge of the hypostome.

Hypostome morphology is highly variable; sometimes supported by an un-mineralised membrane (natant), sometimes fused onto the anterior doublure with an outline very similar to the glabella above (conterminant) or fused to the anterior doublure with an outline significantly different from the glabella (impendent). Many variations in shape and placement of the hypostome have been described. The size of the glabella and the lateral fringe of the cephalon, together with hypostome variation, have been linked to different lifestyles, diets and specific ecological niches.

The lateral fringe of the cephalon is greatly exaggerated in the Harpetida, in other species a bulge in the pre-glabellar area is preserved that suggests a brood pouch. Highly complex compound eyes are another obvious feature of the cephalon.

=== Facial sutures ===
When trilobites moulted, the librigenae ("free cheeks") separated along the facial suture to assist moulting, leaving the cranidium (glabella + fixigenae) exposed. Trilobite facial sutures can be roughly divided into three main types (proparian, gonatoparian, and opisthoparian) according to where the sutures end relative to the genal angle (the edges where the side and rear margins of the cephalon converge). Early Cambrian trilobites belonging to the suborder Olenellina (like Fallotaspis) lacked facial sutures. Other later trilobites also lost facial sutures secondarily.

== See also ==
- Carapace
- Facial suture (trilobite)
- Pygidium
- Tagma (biology)
- Thorax
