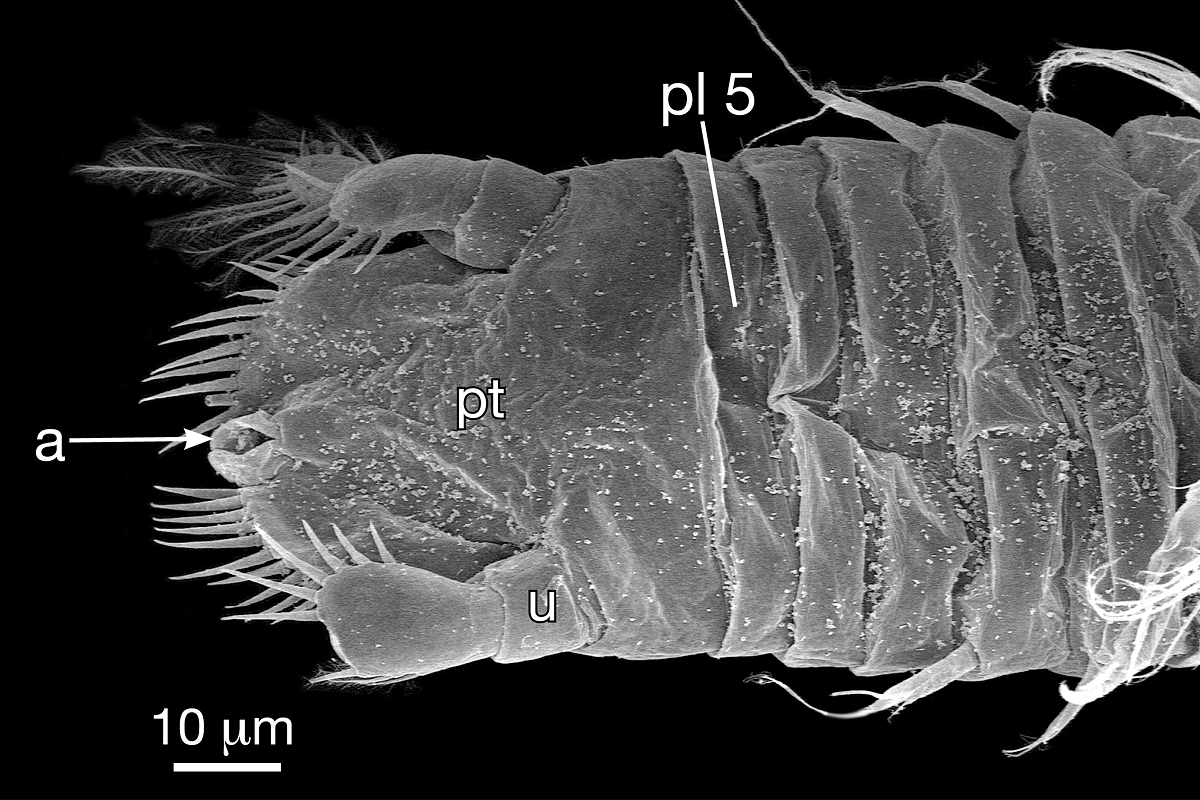
- Thermosbaena mirabilis

Scientific classification
- Kingdom: Animalia
- Phylum: Arthropoda
- Class: Malacostraca
- Order: Thermosbaenacea
- Family: Thermosbaenidae
- Genus: Thermosbaena; Monod, 1924
- Species: T. mirabilis

Binomial name
- Thermosbaena mirabilis Monod, 1924

= Thermosbaena =

Genus of crustaceans

Thermosbaena is a monotypic genus of crustaceans belonging to the monotypic family Thermosbaenidae. The only species is Thermosbaena mirabilis.

The species is found in Southern Mediterranean.

Thermosbaena that lives in hot springs eat blue-green algae, diatom, and other microalgae. Others that do not live in hot springs feed on bacteria and algae associated with detritus.
