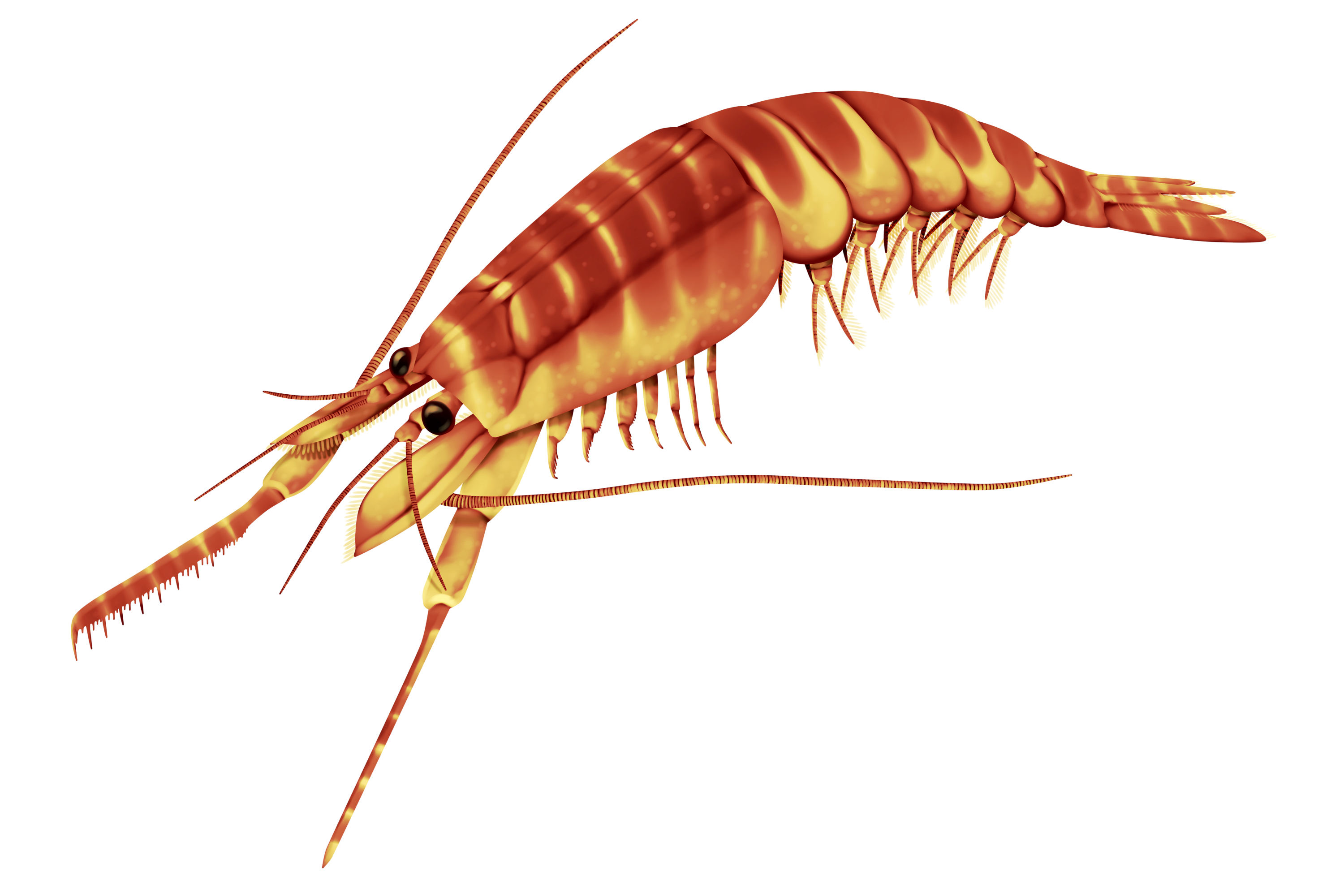
- Reconstruction of Angustidontus

Scientific classification
- Kingdom: Animalia
- Phylum: Arthropoda
- Clade: Pancrustacea
- Class: Malacostraca
- Subclass: Eumalacostraca
- Superorder: Eucarida
- Order: †Angustidontida; Gueriau, Charbonnier & Clément, 2014
- Family: †Angustidontidae; Cooper, 1936

Genera
- †Angustidontus; †Schramidontus

= Angustidontidae =

Angustidontidae Temporal range: Frasnian-Early Carboniferous, 380–340 Ma

Extinct family of crustaceans

Angustidontidae is an extinct family of eucarid crustaceans and the sole representatives of the order Angustidontida. They were predators ranging in size from about 4 to 9 cm (1.6 to 3.5 in) in length and lived during the Late Devonian and Early Carboniferous periods.

They were some of the earliest Eucarids to develop maxillipeds, modified from the first or second thoracopods. They were originally considered eurypterids, but later their possible relationship with decapods was established.
