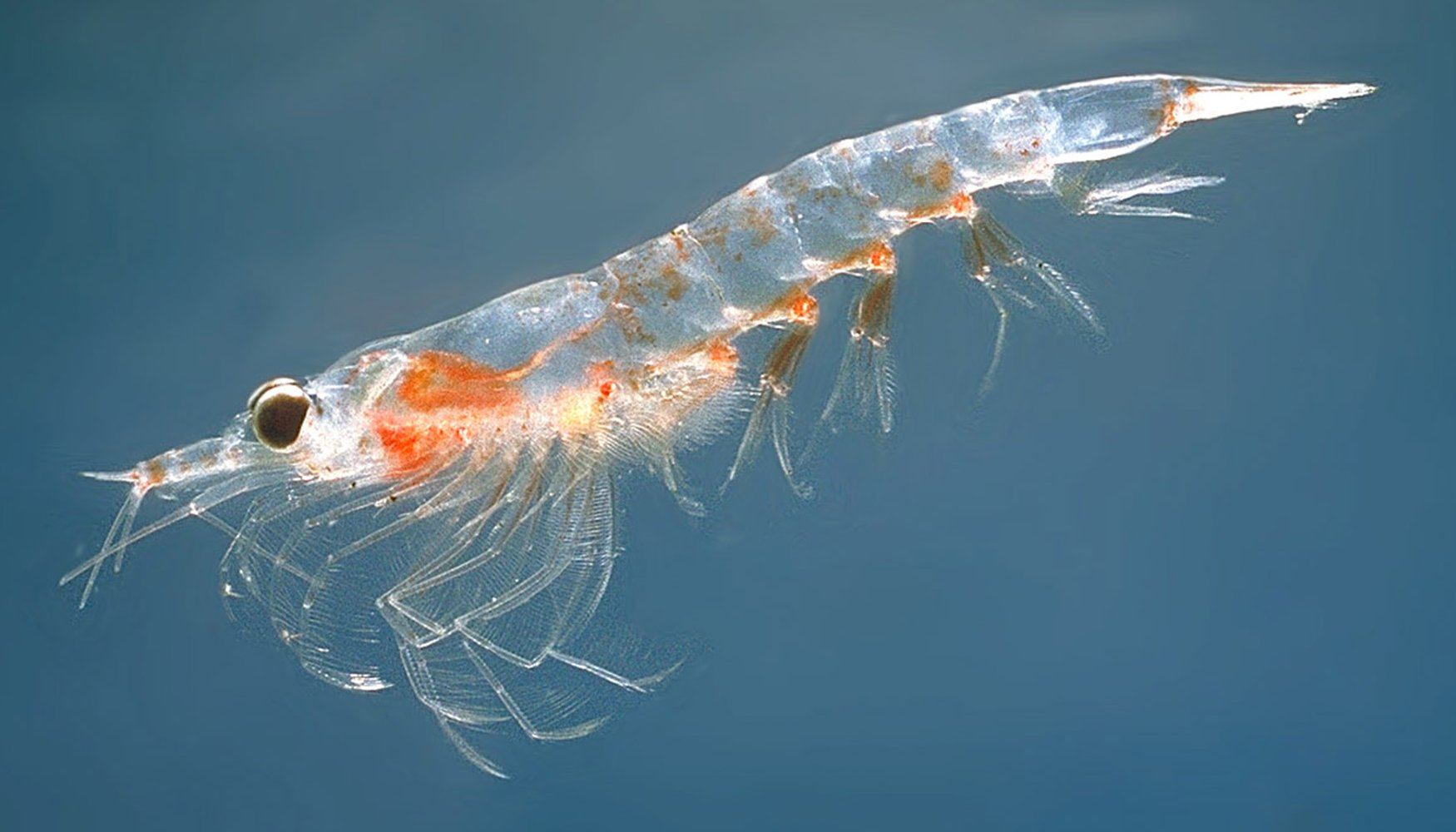
- Meganyctiphanes norvegica, northern krill

Scientific classification
- Kingdom: Animalia
- Phylum: Arthropoda
- Class: Malacostraca
- Subclass: Eumalacostraca
- Superorder: Eucarida; Calman, 1904

Orders
- Decapoda; Euphausiacea; †Angustidontida

= Eucarida =

Eucarida Temporal range: Upper Devonian–Recent

Superorder of crustaceans

Eucarida is a superorder of the Malacostraca, a class of the crustacean subphylum, comprising the decapods, krill, and Angustidontida. They are characterised by having the carapace fused to all thoracic segments, and by the possession of stalked eyes.

== Orders ==
Eucarida is a diverse and abundant group, comprising the following three orders:

=== Euphausiacea ===
The members of the Euphausiacea are commonly called krill and are all marine shrimp-like species whose pleopods (abdominal appendages) function as swimmerets. They swarm and mostly feed on plankton. This group is composed of only 90 species, some of which are the most abundant species on the planet; in fact, it is estimated that the biomass of the Antarctic krill Euphausia superba' is 500 million tons.

=== Decapoda ===
Decapoda is a group with 15,000 species which have 5 pairs of thoracopods and a well-developed carapace that covers the gills (which are exposed in krill). They include lobsters, crabs, shrimp and prawns. The decapods are further subdivided on the basis of the gill structure into two suborders Dendrobranchiata (prawns) and Pleocyemata, which is further subdivided into several infraorders, such as the Caridea (true shrimp), the Stenopodidea (boxer shrimp) and the Anomura and the Brachyura (crabs) and so forth.

=== Angustidontida ===
Lastly, there is an extinct order that contains only one family, Angustidontidae, which in turn contains two genera, Angustidontus and Schramidontus. They were originally considered eurypterids, but later their possible relationship with decapods was established.

== Phylogeny ==
The phylogeny of the Malacostraca is debated. In particular, the monophyly of Eucarida is also under question:

- Monophyletic: many argue that the Eucarida group is a clade, sister to the Peracarida clade or to the basal Malacostraca. or to Mysida (paraphyletic Schizopoda)
- Paraphyletic: some have proposed a paraphyletic Eucarida forming a clade with a nested Peracarida.
- Polyphyletic: some have grouped Euphausiacea with Mysida to form the Schizopoda, or the Euphausiacea with the Hoplocarida, with Decapoda basal to the Peracarida.
