= Spelaeogriphacea =

Spelaeogriphacea Temporal range: Lower Carboniferous – Recent

Scientific classification
- Kingdom: Animalia
- Phylum: Arthropoda
- Clade: Pancrustacea
- Class: Malacostraca
- Subclass: Eumalacostraca
- Superorder: Peracarida
- Order: Spelaeogriphacea; Gordon, 1957

Genera
- Mangkurtu; Potiicoara; Spelaeogriphus; Acadiocarididae; †Acadiocaris; †Liaoningogriphus; †Spinogriphus

Order of cave dwelling crustaceans

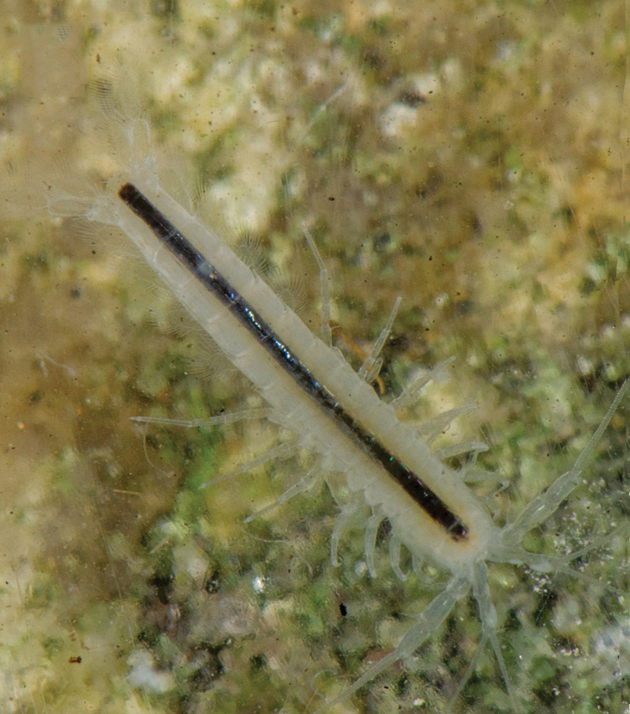
Spelaeogriphus lepidops

Spelaeogriphacea is an order of crustaceans that grow to no more than 10 millimetres (0.39 in). Little is known about the ecology of the order.

Only four species, all subterranean, have been described. Of the three genera, Potiicoara is known only from a cave in Brazil's Mato Grosso, Spelaeogriphus only from a cave on Table Mountain in South Africa, and the two Mangkurtu species only from individual Australian aquifers. Fossils of the group are known from the Early Carboniferous of Canada (Acadiocaris) and the Early Cretaceous of Spain (Spinogriphus, Las Hoyas) and China (Liaoningogriphus, Yixian Formation), which are assigned to the family Acadiocarididae.
