= Jean Milton Berdan =

American geologist

- Born: May 19, 1916
- Died: November 16, 2004 (aged 88)
- Citizenship: American
- Education: Yale University, 1949
- Scientific career
- Fields: Geology
- Workplaces: United States Geological Survey, Paleontology and Stratigraphy Branch

Jean Milton Berdan (May 19, 1916 – November 16, 2004) was an American geologist.

== Biography ==
Berdan was born in 1916. After receiving a bachelor's degree from Vassar College, she received a Ph.D. from Yale University in 1949. She joined the United States Geological Survey Water Resource Division in 1942. On the year she graduated from Yale, she got a career in the Paleontology and Stratigraphy Branch of the USGS. She made ostracodes and stratigraphy for Ordovician, Silurian, and Devonian periods. She wrote plenty of papers on them, including, USGS Examinations and Reports, filings, notes, and photographs. She died in 2004.
