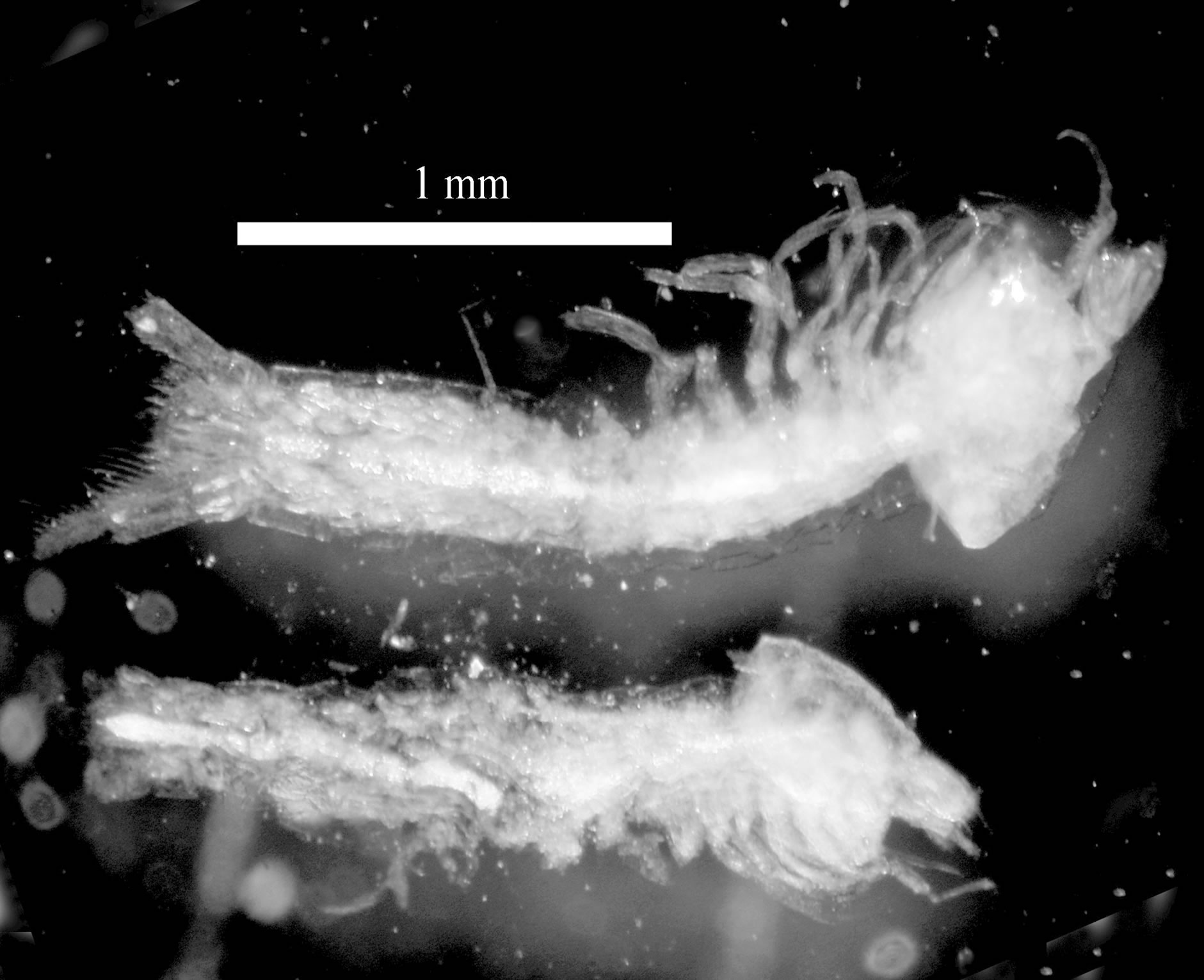
- Tethysbaena ophelicola sub-adults

Scientific classification
- Kingdom: Animalia
- Phylum: Arthropoda
- Clade: Pancrustacea
- Class: Malacostraca
- Superorder: Peracarida
- Order: Thermosbaenacea; Monod, 1927

Families
- Halosbaenidae; Monodellidae; Thermosbaenidae; Tulumellidae

= Thermosbaenacea =

Order of crustaceans

Thermosbaenacea is a group of crustaceans that live in thermal springs in fresh water, brackish water and anchialine habitats. They have occasionally been treated as a distinct superorder (Pancarida), but are generally considered to belong to the Peracarida. Due to their troglobitic lifestyle, thermosbaenaceans lack visual pigments and are therefore blind.

The current distribution of some genera tallies well with the Miocene extent of the Tethys Sea, and it is assumed that the extant taxa are derived from ancestors that lived in open marine habitats. Elsewhere, the distribution is consistent with the break-up of Pangaea.

The developing embryos are carried by the adult under its carapace until hatching.

== Classification ==
Thirty-four species are currently recognised, in four families:

- Thermosbaenidae Monod, 1927
  - Thermosbaena mirabilis Monod, 1924 Tunisia
- Monodellidae Taramelli, 1924
  - Monodella stygicola Ruffo, 1949 southern Italy
  - Tethysbaena aiakos Wagner, 1994 Greece
  - Tethysbaena argentarii (Stella, 1951) Italy
  - Tethysbaena atlantomaroccana (Boutin & Cals, 1985) Morocco
  - Tethysbaena calsi Wagner, 1994 British Virgin Islands
  - Tethysbaena colubrae Wagner, 1994 Puerto Rico
  - Tethysbaena coqui Wagner, 1994 Puerto Rico
  - Tethysbaena gaweini Wagner, 1994 Cuba
  - Tethysbaena haitiensis Wagner, 1994 Cuba
  - Tethysbaena halophila (S.L. Karaman, 1953) Croatia
  - Tethysbaena juglandis Wagner, 1994 Haiti
  - Tethysbaena juriaani Wagner, 1994 Cuba
  - Tethysbaena lazarei Wagner, 1994 Cuba
  - Tethysbaena relicta (Por, 1962) Israel
  - Tethysbaena sanctaecrucis (Stock, 1976) British Virgin Islands
  - Tethysbaena scabra (Pretus, 1991) Spain (Balearic Islands)
  - Tethysbaena scitula Wagner, 1994 British Virgin Islands
  - Tethysbaena siracusae Wagner, 1994 Italy (Sicily)
  - Tethysbaena stocki Wagner, 1994 British Virgin Islands
  - Tethysbaena somala (Chelazzi & Messana, 1982) Somalia
  - Tethysbaena tarsiensis Wagner, 1994 Spain
  - Tethysbaena texana (Maguire, 1965) United States (Texas)
  - Tethysbaena tinima Wagner, 1994 Cuba
  - Tethysbaena vinabayesi Wagner, 1994 Cuba
- Tulumellidae Wagner, 1994
  - Tulumella bahamensis Yager, 1988 Bahamas
  - Tulumella grandis Yager, 1988 Bahamas
  - Tulumella unidens Bowman & Iliffe, 1988 Mexico
- Halosbaenidae Monod & Cals, 1988
  - Limnosbaena finki Mestrov & Lattinger-Penko, 1969 Bosnia and Herzegovina and northern Italy
  - Halosbaena acanthura Stock, 1976 Venezuela, Netherlands Antilles (Curaçao)
  - Halosbaena fortunata Bowman & Iliffe, 1986 Spain (Canary Islands)
  - Halosbaena tulki Poore & Humphreys, 1992 Australia (Western Australia)
  - Theosbaena cambodjiana Cals & Boutin, 1985 Cambodia
