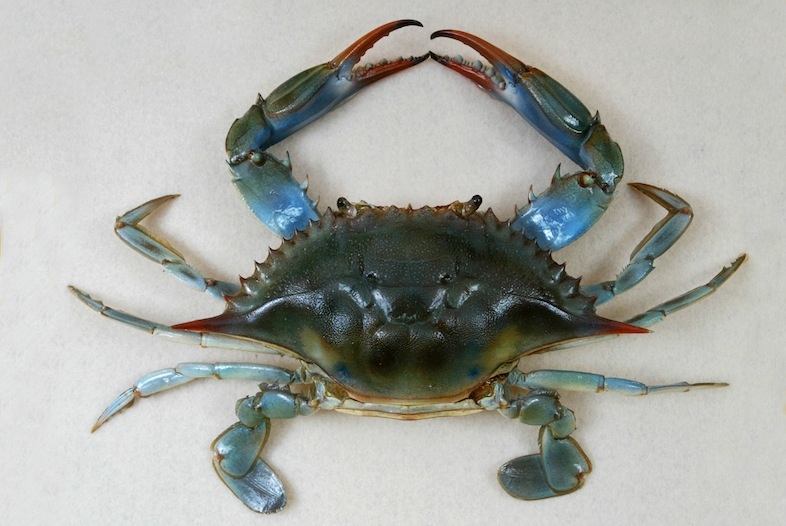
- Atlantic blue crab, Callinectes sapidus

Scientific classification
- Kingdom: Animalia
- Phylum: Arthropoda
- Clade: Pancrustacea
- Class: Malacostraca
- Subclass: Eumalacostraca; Grobben, 1892

Superorders
- Syncarida; Peracarida; Eucarida

= Eumalacostraca =

Eumalacostraca Temporal range: Upper Devonian–Recent

Subclass of crustaceans

Eumalacostraca is a subclass of crustaceans, containing almost all living malacostracans, or about 40,000 described species. The remaining subclasses of crustaceans that are not in Eumalacostraca are the Phyllocarida and possibly the Hoplocarida. Eumalacostracans have 19 segments (5 cephalic, 8 thoracic and 6 abdominal). This arrangement is known as the "caridoid facies", a term coined by William Thomas Calman in 1909. The thoracic limbs are jointed and used for swimming or walking. The common ancestor is thought to have had a carapace, and most living species possess one, but it has been lost in some subgroups.

== Caridoid facies ==
Calman identified the following features as distinguishing eumalacostracan crustaceans:

"Carapace enveloping the thoracic region; movably stalked eyes; biramous first antenna; scale-like exopod on the second antenna; natatory exopods on the thoracic limbs; elongate, ventrally flexible abdomen; tail fan formed by the lamellar rami of the uropods on either side of the telson."

== Classification ==
Martin and Davis present the following classification of living eumalacostracans into orders, to which extinct orders have been added, indicated by †.

The group as originally described by Karl Grobben included the Stomatopoda (mantis shrimp), and a number of modern experts and databases (ex. NCBI) continue to use this definition. This article follows Martin and Davis in excluding them; they are placed in their own subclass, Hoplocarida.

Subclass Eumalacostraca Grobben, 1892

- Superorder Syncarida Packard, 1885
  - †Order Palaeocaridacea
  - Order Bathynellacea Chappuis, 1915
  - Order Anaspidacea Calman, 1904 (including Stygocaridacea)
- Superorder Peracarida Calman, 1904
  - Order Spelaeogriphacea Gordon, 1957
  - Order Thermosbaenacea Monod, 1927
  - Order Lophogastrida Sars, 1870
  - Order Mysida Haworth, 1825
  - Order Mictacea Bowman, Garner, Hessler, Iliffe & Sanders, 1985
  - Order Amphipoda Latreille, 1816
  - Order Isopoda Latreille, 1817 (including Pillbugs)
  - Order Tanaidacea Dana, 1849
  - Order Cumacea Krøyer, 1846
- Superorder Eucarida Calman, 1904
  - Order Euphausiacea Dana, 1852
  - Order Decapoda Latreille, 1802
  - †Order Angustidontida Gueriau, Charbonnier & Clément, 2014
