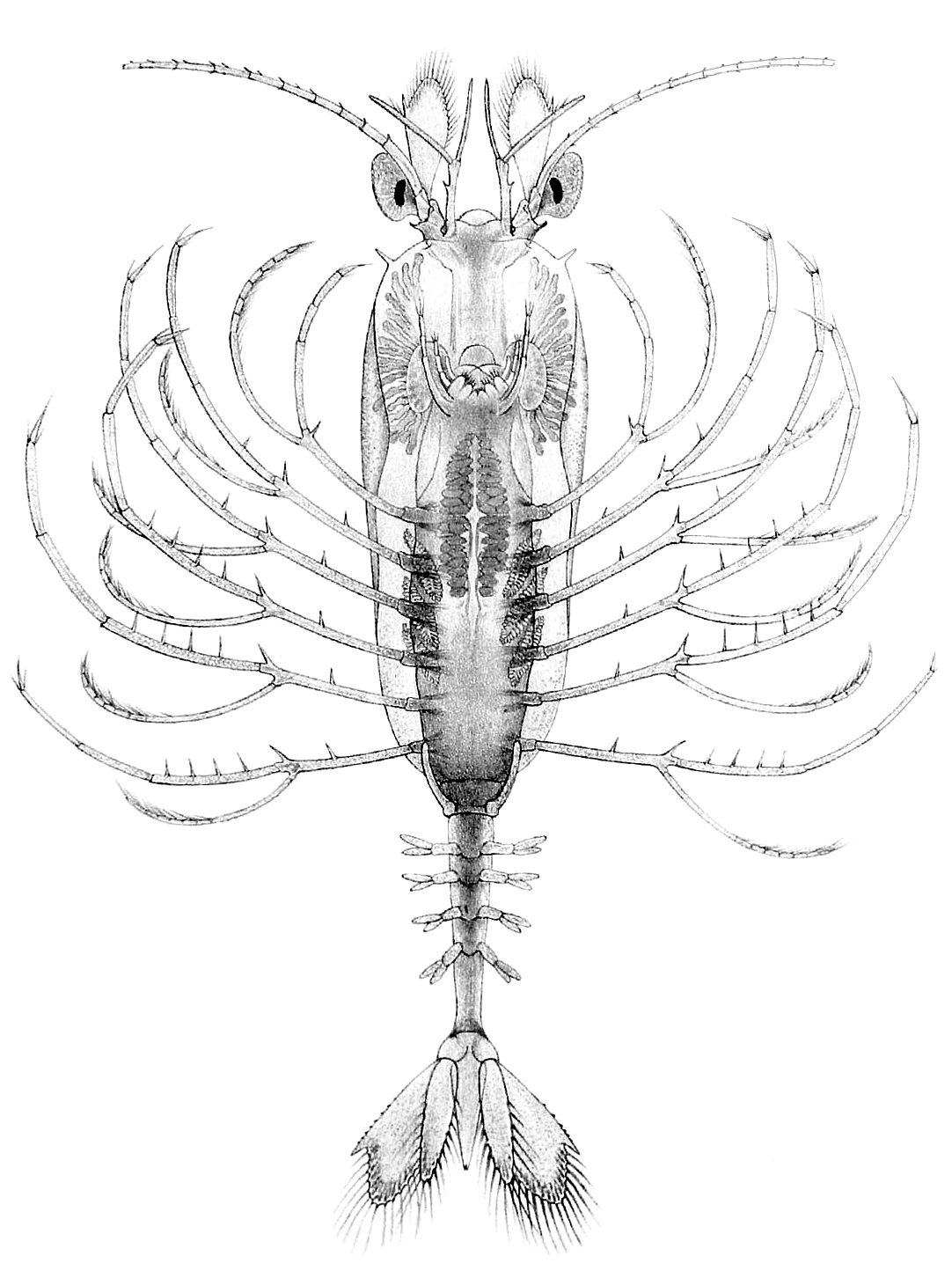

Scientific classification
- Kingdom: Animalia
- Phylum: Arthropoda
- Clade: Pancrustacea
- Class: Malacostraca
- Order: Decapoda
- Suborder: Pleocyemata
- Infraorder: Caridea
- Family: Pandalidae
- Genus: Amphionides; Zimmer, 1904
- Species: A. reynaudii

Binomial name
- Amphionides reynaudii (H. Milne-Edwards, 1833)

Synonyms
- Amphion armata Koeppel, 1902; Amphion provocatoris Bate, 1888; Amphion reynaudii H. Milne-Edwards, 1833; Amphionides valdiviae Zimmer, 1904

= Amphionides =

Monotypic species of planktonic crustacean

Amphionides reynaudii is a species of caridean shrimp, whose identity and position in the crustacean system remained enigmatic for a long time. It is a small (less than one inch long) planktonic crustacean found throughout the world's tropical oceans, which until 2015 was considered the sole representative of the order Amphionidacea, due to unusual morphological features. Molecular data however confirm it as a member of the caridean family Pandalidae, and the confusion of morphology is because only larval phases have so far been studied.

== Description ==
Amphionides specimens observed have been up to 25 mm (1.0 in) long. In view of adult shrimp morphology, Amphionides appears unusual, with many body parts being reduced or absent. For example, it has only one pair of mouthparts – the maxillae – the mandibles and maxillules being vestigial.

Males and females differ in the form of the antennae, and also by the presence in males of the eighth thoracic appendage, albeit in a reduced form. This is the site of the male gonopore (the female's gonopore is on the sixth thoracic appendage). The first pleopod of the female is greatly enlarged and almost encloses the enlarged carapace. This is assumed to be a chamber in which the eggs are fertilised and retained until hatching. The more streamlined carapace and pleopods of the male make it more hydrodynamic, so fewer males are caught than females.

== Distribution and ecology ==
A. reynaudii has a cosmopolitan distribution in the world's tropical oceans. It is planktonic, inhabiting waters less than 100 m (330 ft) deep as a larva.

== Classification ==
Originally described from earlier larval stages, Amphionides was actually first thought to be a shrimp. In 1969 it was connected to a supposed adult form described earlier by Carl Zimmer (1904), not recognisable as a caridean shrimp, and in 1973 was Amphionides placed in its own order Amphionidacea by Donald I. Williamson, i.e., at the same rank as the Decapoda and Euphausiacea. The specific epithet reynaudii was given by Henri Milne-Edwards in honour of a friend of his, possibly Count François Dominique Reynaud de Montlosier.

Based on molecular comparisons, the species was moved back to Decapoda and to the shrimp infraorder Caridea in 2015, while the adult stage still remains undiscovered. It was speculated that observations from different oceans represent larval stages of different shrimp species. Broader analyses confirmed that Amphionides belongs to the family Pandalidae, but it does not seem to be associated with any of the previously recognised pandalid genera, while it indeed has an inter-oceanic distribution.
