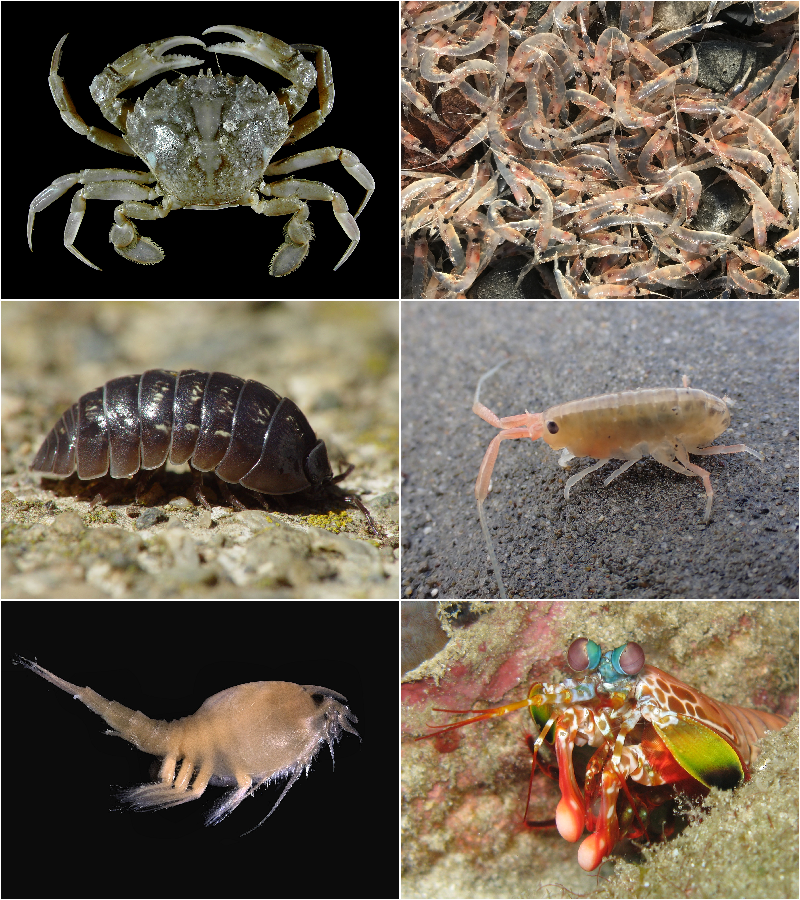

Scientific classification
- Kingdom: Animalia
- Phylum: Arthropoda
- Clade: Pancrustacea
- Superclass: Multicrustacea
- Class: Malacostraca; Latreille, 1802

Subclasses
- Eumalacostraca; Hoplocarida; Phyllocarida; See text for orders.

= Malacostraca =

Malacostraca Temporal range: Cambrian–Present

Largest class of crustaceans

Malacostraca is the second largest of the six classes of pancrustaceans after insects, containing about 40,000 living species, divided among 16 orders. Its members, the malacostracans, display a great diversity of body forms and include crabs, lobsters, spiny lobsters, crayfish, shrimp, krill, prawns, isopods, amphipods, mantis shrimp, and many other less familiar animals. They are abundant in all marine environments and have colonised freshwater and terrestrial habitats. They are segmented animals, united by a common body plan comprising 20 body segments (rarely 21), and divided into a head, thorax, and abdomen.

== Etymology ==
The name Malacostraca is from Ancient Greek μαλακός (malakós) 'soft' and ὄστρακον (óstrakon) 'shell'. The word was used by Aristotle, who contrasted them with oysters, in comparison with which their shells are pliable.

It was applied to this taxon by French zoologist Pierre André Latreille in 1802. He was curator of the arthropod collection at the National Museum of Natural History in Paris.

This scientific name is a misnomer, since the shell is soft only immediately after moulting, and is usually hard.

Malacostracans are sometimes contrasted with entomostracans, a name applied to all crustaceans outside the Malacostraca, and named after the obsolete taxon Entomostraca.

== Description ==
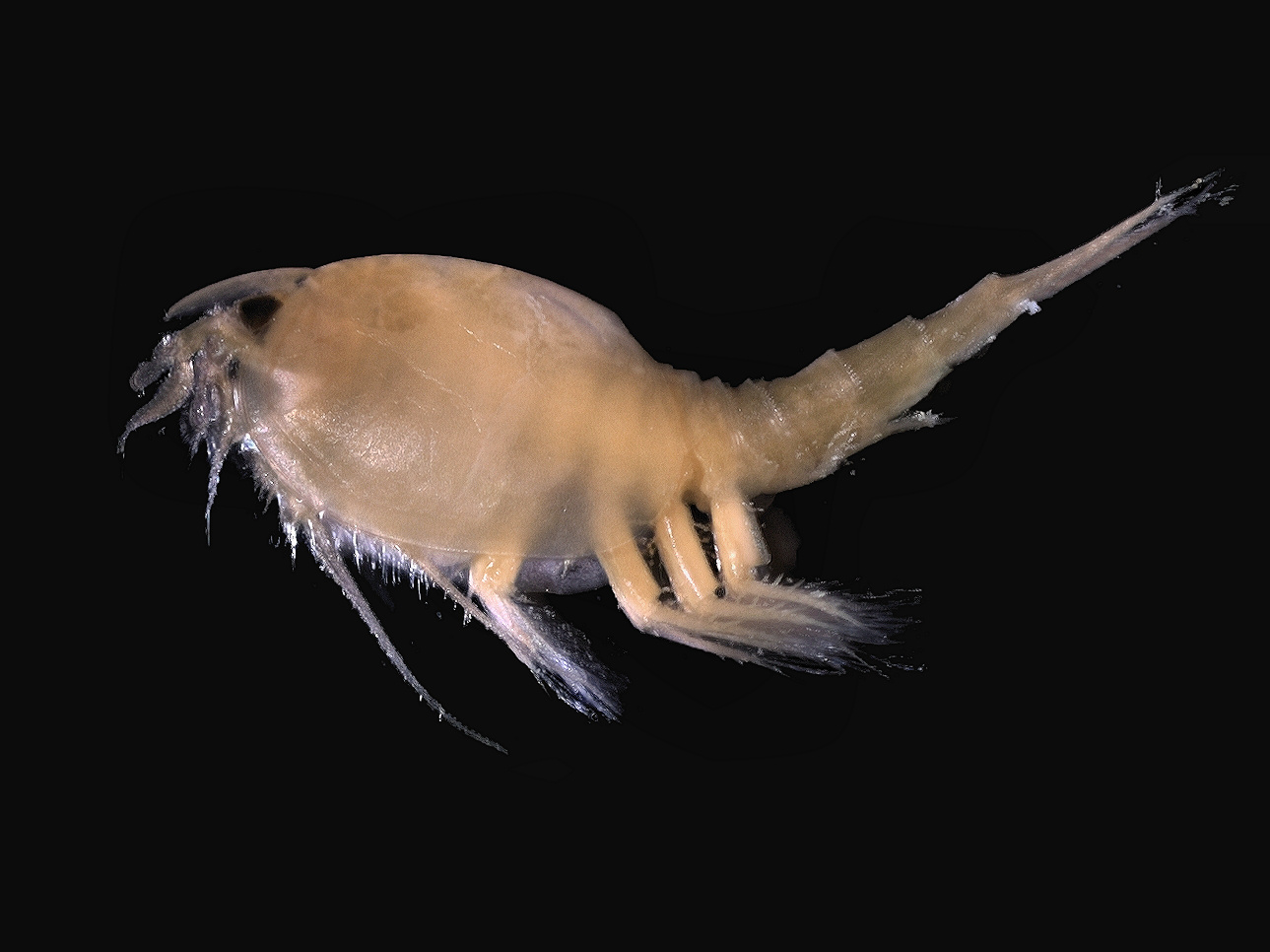
Leptostraca such as Nebalia bipes retain the primitive condition of having seven abdominal segments.

The class Malacostraca includes about 40,000 species, and "arguably ... contains a greater diversity of body forms than any other class in the animal kingdom". Its members are characterised by the presence of three tagmata (specialized groupings of multiple segments) – a five-segmented head, an eight-segmented thorax and an abdomen with six segments and a telson, except in the Leptostraca, which retain the ancestral condition of seven abdominal segments. Malacostracans have abdominal appendages, a fact that differentiates them from all other major crustacean taxa except Remipedia. Each body segment bears a pair of jointed appendages, although these may be lost secondarily.

=== Tagmata ===
The head bears two pairs of antennae, the first of which is often biramous (branching into two parts). The second pair of antennae bears exopods (outer branches) which are often flattened into antennal scales known as scaphocerites. The mouthparts consist of pairs each of mandibles, maxillules (second pair of mouthparts) and maxillae. Except for fairy shrimps, malacostracans are the only extant arthropods with compound eyes placed on moveable stalks, although in some taxa the eyes are unstalked, reduced or lost.

Up to three thoracic segments may be fused with the head to form a cephalothorax; the associated appendages turn forward and are modified as maxillipeds (accessory mouthparts). A carapace may be absent, present or secondarily lost, and may cover the head, part or all of the thorax and some of the abdomen. It is variable in form and may be fused dorsally with some of the thoracic segments or occasionally be in two parts, hinged dorsally. Typically, each of the thoracic appendages is biramous and the endopods are the better developed of the branches, being used for crawling or grasping. Each endopod consist of seven articulating segments; the coxa, basis, ischium, merus, carpus, propodus and dactylus. In decapods, the claw is formed by the articulation of the dactylus against an outgrowth of the propodus. In some taxa, the exopods are lost and the appendages are uniramous.

There is a clear demarcation between the thorax and the six or seven-segmented abdomen. In most taxa, each abdominal segment except the last carries a pair of biramous pleopods used for swimming, burrowing, gas exchange, creating a current or brooding eggs. The first and second abdominal pleopods may be modified in the male to form gonopods (accessory copulatory appendages). The appendages of the last segment are typically flattened into uropods, which together with the terminal telson, make up the "tail fan". It is the sudden flexion of this tail fan that provides the thrust for the rapid escape response of these crustaceans and the tail fan is also used in steering. In Leptostraca, the appendages on the telson instead form caudal rami (spine-like protrusions).

=== Internal anatomy ===
The digestive tract is straight and the foregut consists of a short oesophagus and a two-chambered stomach, the first part of which contains a gizzard-like "gastric mill" for grinding food. The walls of this have chitinous ridges, teeth and calcareous ossicles. The fine particles and soluble material are then moved into the midgut where chemical processing and absorption takes place in one or more pairs of large digestive caeca. The hindgut is concerned with water reclamation and the formation of faeces and the anus is situated at the base of the telson.

Like other crustaceans, malacostracans have an open circulatory system in which the heart pumps blood into the hemocoel (body cavity) where it supplies the needs of the organs for oxygen and nutrients before diffusing back to the heart. The typical respiratory pigment in malacostracans is haemocyanin. Structures that function as kidneys are located near the base of the antennae. A brain exists in the form of ganglia close to the antennae, there are ganglia in each segment and a collection of major ganglia below the oesophagus. Sensory organs include compound eyes (often stalked), ocelli (simple eyes), statocysts and sensory bristles. The naupliar eye is a characteristic of the nauplius larva and consists of four cup-shaped ocelli facing in different directions and able to distinguish between light and darkness.

== Ecology ==
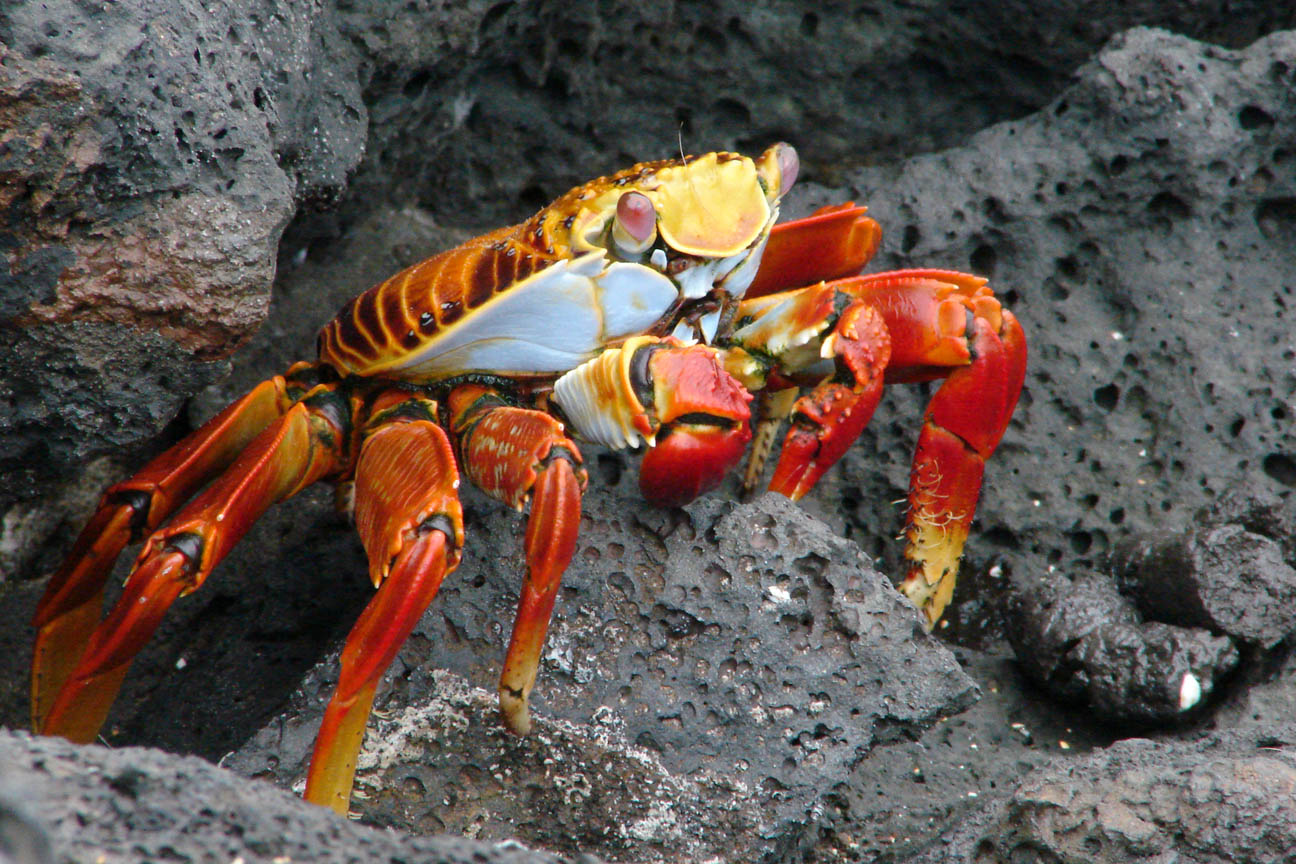
Grapsus grapsus, a terrestrial crab

Malacostracans live in a wide range of marine and freshwater habitats, and three orders have terrestrial members: Amphipoda (Talitridae), Isopoda (Oniscidea, the woodlice) and Decapoda (terrestrial hermit crabs, crabs of the families Ocypodidae, Gecarcinidae, and Grapsidae, and terrestrial crayfish). They are abundant in all marine ecosystems, and most species are scavengers, although some, such as the porcelain crabs, are filter feeders, and some, such as mantis shrimps, are carnivores.

== Life cycle ==
Most species of malacostracans have distinct sexes (a phenomenon known as gonochorism), although a few species exhibit hermaphroditism. The female genital openings or gonopores are located on the sixth thoracic segment or its appendages, while the male gonopores are on the eighth segment or its appendages, or in a small number of species, on the seventh. The naupliar larval stages are often reduced and take place before hatching, but where they occur, a metamorphosis usually occurs between the larval and the adult forms. Primitive malacostracans have a free-swimming naupliar larval stage. Research suggests the common ancestor of Malacostraca had lost the free-living nauplius larval stage, but re-evolved it again through heterochrony in Dendrobranchiata and Euphausiacea, which both have a lecithotrophic (non-feeding) nauplius stage.

== Mating ==
Mating behavior has been studied in the freshwater shrimp Caridina ensifera. Multiple paternity, common in the Malacostrica, also occurs in C. ensifera. Reproductive success of sires was found to correlate inversely with their genetic relatedness to the mother. This finding suggests that sperm competition and/or pre- and post-copulatory female choice occurs. Female choice may increase the fitness of progeny by avoiding inbreeding that can lead to expression of homozygous deleterious recessive mutations.

== Phylogenetics ==
The monophyly of Malacostraca is widely accepted. This is supported by several common morphological traits which are present throughout the group and is confirmed by molecular studies. However, a number of problems make it difficult to determine the relationships between the orders of Malacostraca. These include differences in mutation rates in different lineages, different patterns of evolution being apparent in different sources of data, including convergent evolution, and long branch attraction.

There is less agreement on the status of the subclass Phyllocarida with its single extant order, Leptostraca, depending on whether foliaceous (leaf-like) limbs have a single or multiple origin. Some authors advocate placing Phyllocarida in Phyllopoda, a group used in former classification systems, which would then include branchiopods, cephalocarids and leptostracans. A molecular study by American biologists Trisha Spears and Lawrence Abele concluded that phylogenetic evidence did not support the monophyly of this grouping, and that Phyllocarida should be regarded as a subclass of Malacostraca that had diverged from the main lineage at an early date.

The next cladogram follows a 2023 revision of pancrustacean phylogeny based on molecular data. The cladogram shows traditional paraphyletic groups and presents new monophyletic clades.

- - Thecostraca
  - Malacostraca
    - Phyllocarida
    - - Peracarida
      - Stomatocarida
        - Hoplocarida
        - Syneucarida
          - Bathynellacea
          - - - Anaspidacea
              - Euphausiacea
            - Decapoda

The sister relationship of Euphausiacea to Anaspidacea rather than to Decapoda renders the classically recognized Eucarida paraphyletic. Additionally, Syncarida is polyphyletic, as Bathynellacea and Anaspidacea are not sister groups to each other. Together, the syncarids and eucarids are grouped in Syneucarida. The traditional subclass Eumalacostraca was also found to be paraphyletic as it classically excludes Hoplocarida and only includes Peracarida, Syncarida, and Eucarida. Thus, Malacostraca is divided into three clades: Phyllocarida, Peracarida, and Stomatocarida.

=== Subclass Phyllocarida ===
Leptostraca is the only extant order of Phyllocarida; the other two orders, Archaeostraca and Hoplostraca, are extinct. Leptostracans are thought to be the most primitive of the malacostracans and date back to the Cambrian period. They range in length from 1 to 4 cm (0.4 to 1.6 in), most being suspension feeders though some are carnivores or scavengers. They have a two part carapace which encloses the head, the whole thorax and part of the abdomen and are the only malacostracans with seven abdominal segments. Three families are known with several genera and about twenty species. They are found worldwide from the intertidal zone to the deep ocean, all but one species being benthic (living on the seabed).

=== Subclass Hoplocarida ===
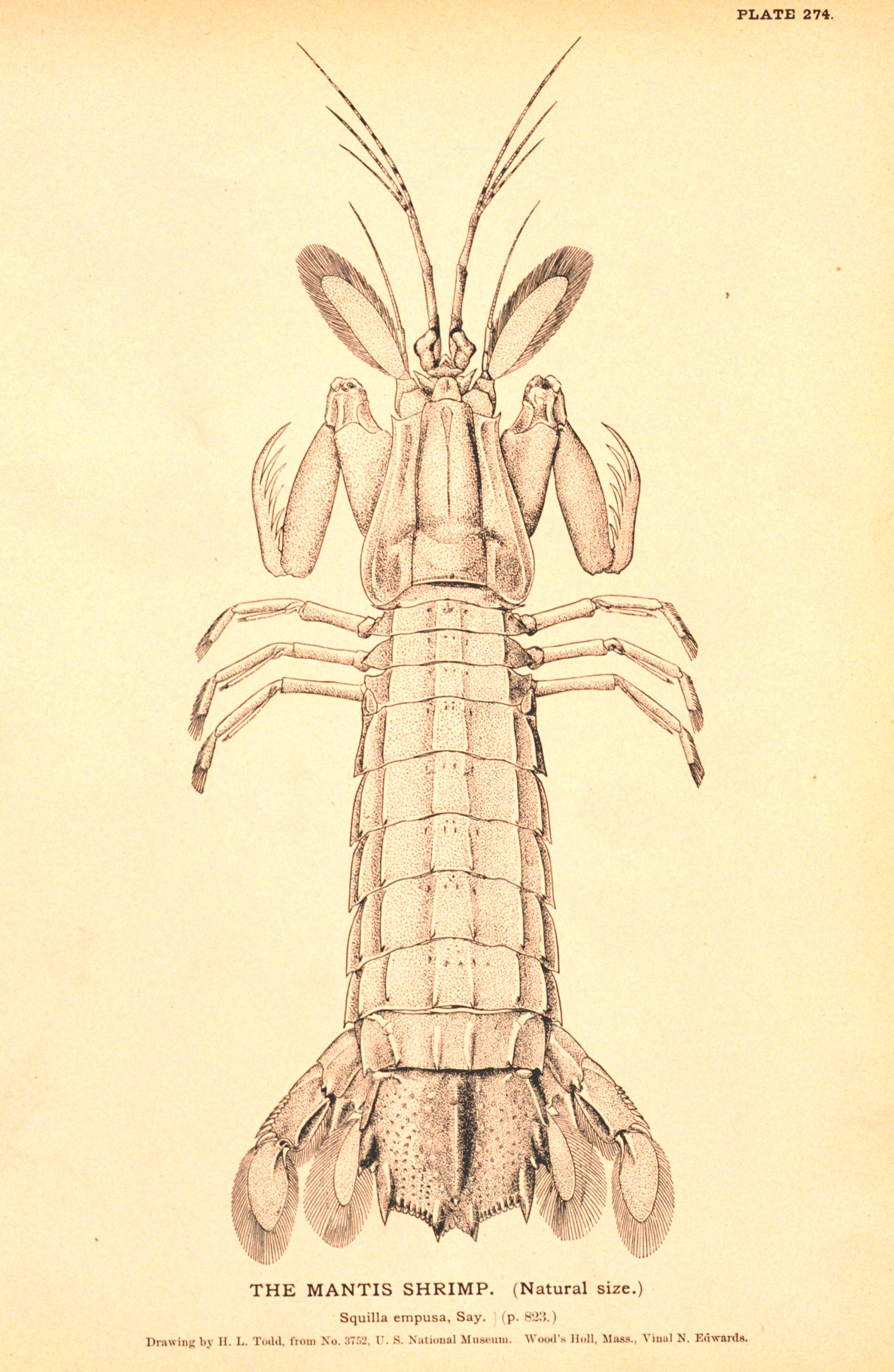
Squilla empusa, a mantis shrimp

Stomatopoda is the only extant order of Hoplocarida, the other two orders, Aeschronectida and Archaeostomatopoda being extinct. Stomatopodans, commonly known as mantis shrimps, range in length from 5 to 36 cm (2 to 14 in) and are predators. They have a dorso-ventrally flattened body and a shield-like carapace and are armed with powerful, raptorial claws normally carried in a folded position. There are about 300 species, most living in tropical and subtropical seas although some live in temperate areas. They are benthic, mostly hiding in cracks and crevices or living in burrows, some emerging to forage while others are ambush predators.

=== Subclass Eumalacostraca ===
The Eumalocostraca contains the vast majority of the approximately 40,000 living species of malacostracans and consists of three superorders, Syncarida, Peracarida and Eucarida. Syncaridans are mostly small and found in freshwater and subterranean habitats. Peracaridans are characterised by having a marsupium in which they brood their young. They are found in marine, freshwater and terrestrial habitats and include Amphipoda, Cumacea, Isopoda and Mysida. Eucarida includes lobsters, crabs, shrimps, prawns and krill.

=== Fossil record ===
The first malacostracans appeared sometime in the Cambrian, when animals belonging to the Phyllocarida appeared.

== Classification ==
The following classification of living malacostracans is based on An Updated Classification of the Recent Crustacea (2001) by the American marine biologists Joel W. Martin, curator of crustaceans at the Natural History Museum of Los Angeles County, and George E. Davies. Extinct orders have been added to this and are indicated by an obelisk (†).

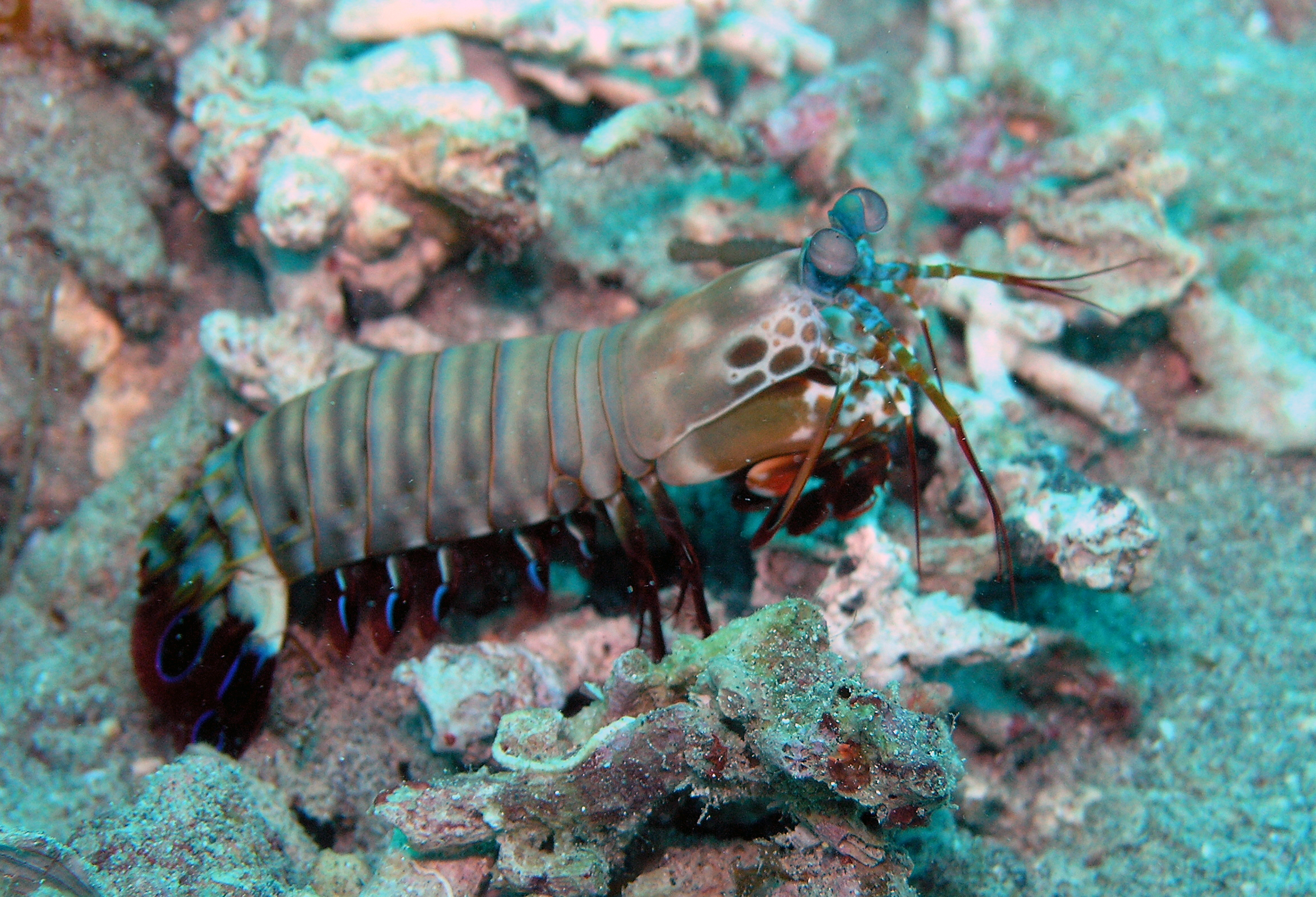
Odontodactylus scyllarus (Hoplocarida: Stomatopoda)

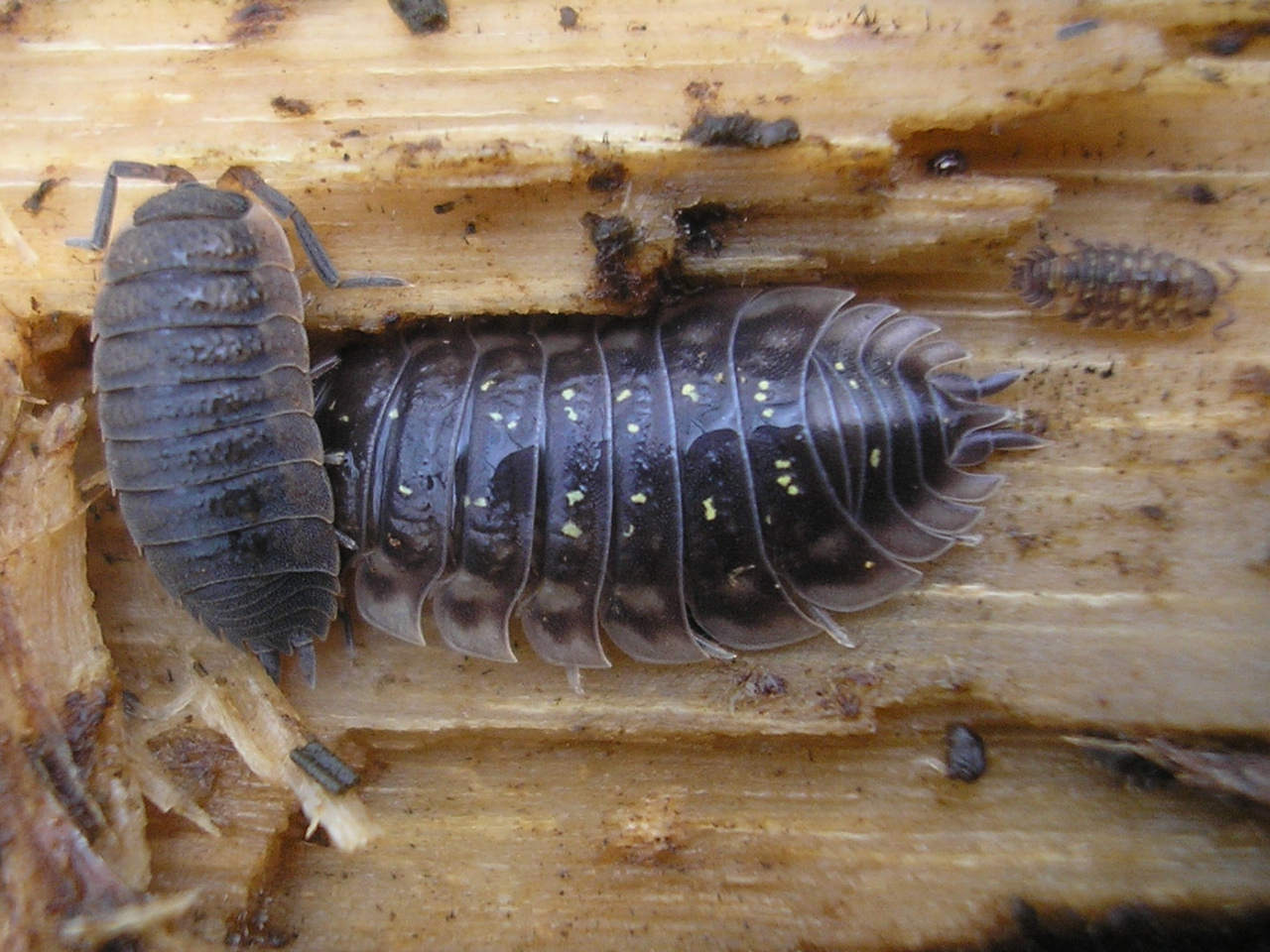
Porcellio scaber and Oniscus asellus (Peracarida: Isopoda)

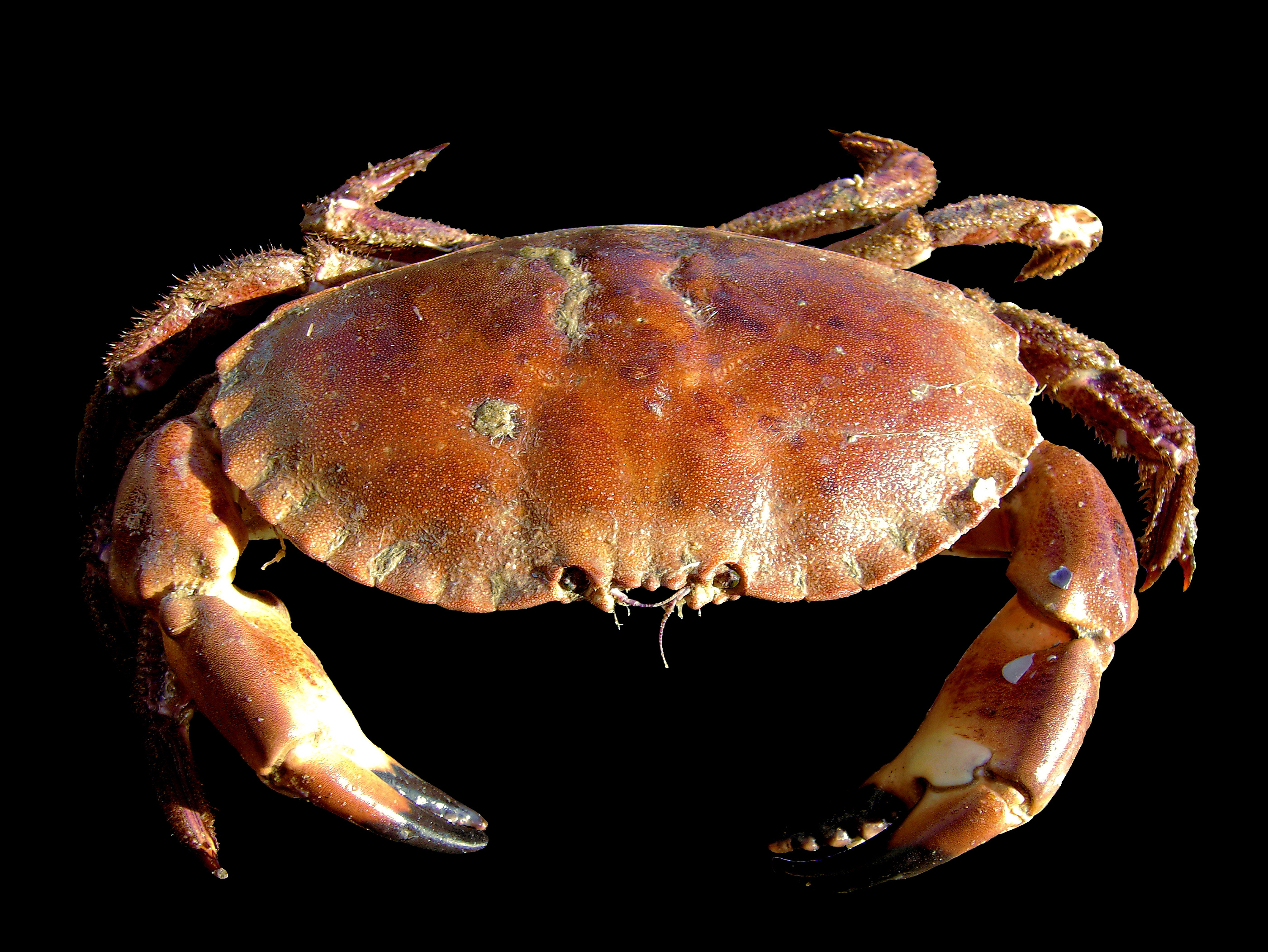
Cancer pagurus (Eucarida: Decapoda)

Class Malacostraca Latreille, 1802

- Subclass Phyllocarida Packard, 1879

- † Archaeostraca Claus 1888
- † Hoplostraca Schram, 1973
- Leptostraca Claus, 1880

- Subclass Hoplocarida Calman, 1904

- † Aeschronectida Schram, 1969
- † Archaeostomatopoda Schram, 1969
- Stomatopoda Latreille, 1817

- Subclass Eumalacostraca Grobben, 1892
  - Superorder Syncarida Packard, 1885
    - † Palaeocaridacea Brooks, 1979
    - Bathynellacea Chappuis, 1915
    - Anaspidacea Calman, 1904
  - Superorder Peracarida Calman, 1904
    - Spelaeogriphacea Gordon, 1957
    - Thermosbaenacea Monod, 1927
    - Lophogastrida Sars, 1870
    - Mysida Haworth, 1825
    - Stygiomysida Tchindonova, 1981
    - Mictacea Bowman et al., 1985
    - Amphipoda Latreille, 1816
    - Isopoda Latreille, 1817
    - Tanaidacea Dana, 1849
    - Cumacea Krøyer, 1846
  - Superorder Eucarida Calman, 1904
    - † Angustidontida Gueriau, Charbonnier & Clément, 2014
    - Euphausiacea Dana, 1852
    - Decapoda Latreille, 1802
