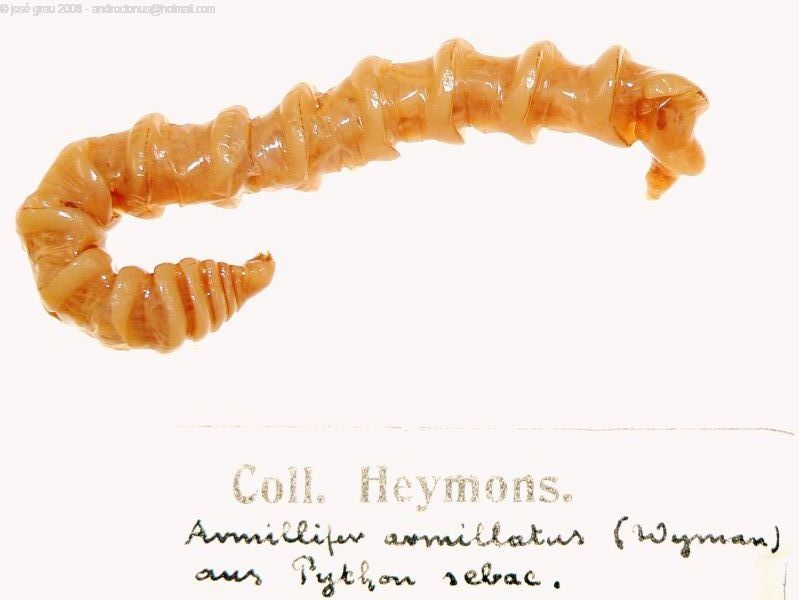
- A 4 cm specimen from the respiratory tract of Python sebae

Scientific classification
- Kingdom: Animalia
- Phylum: Arthropoda
- Clade: Pancrustacea
- Class: Ichthyostraca
- Order: Porocephalida
- Family: Porocephalidae
- Genus: Armillifer
- Species: A. armillatus

Binomial name
- Armillifer armillatus (Wyman, 1848)

Synonyms
- List: Linguatula armillata Wyman, 1845; Linguatula diesingii Van Beneden, 1848; Pentastoma leonis Wedl, 1863; Pentastoma polyzonum Harley, 1857; Pentastomum constrictum von Siebold, 1853; Pentastomum euryzonum Diesing, 1850; Pentastomum protelis Hoyle, 1883; Pentastomum tornatum Creplin, 1849

= Armillifer armillatus =

Species of crustacean

Armillifer armillatus is a species of tongue worm in the subclass Pentastomida occurring in tropical Africa. Its typical definitive hosts are pythons, such as the African rock python, while rodents are presumed to act as intermediate hosts. Humans may become accidentally infected by the eggs particularly if consuming (or otherwise contacting) infected snakes. Ingested eggs develop into nymphs that invade different visceral organs causing a disease called porocephalosis. Humans have been infected by eating undercooked snake meat or through direct contact. Most human infections are asymptomatic, some are debilitating, or rarely even lethal. Diagnoses of infection has usually been done by accident, and almost all patients did not require treatment.

Most of the pythons sold for human consumption at the rural bushmeat markets in the Democratic Republic of Congo host Armillifer armillatus.
