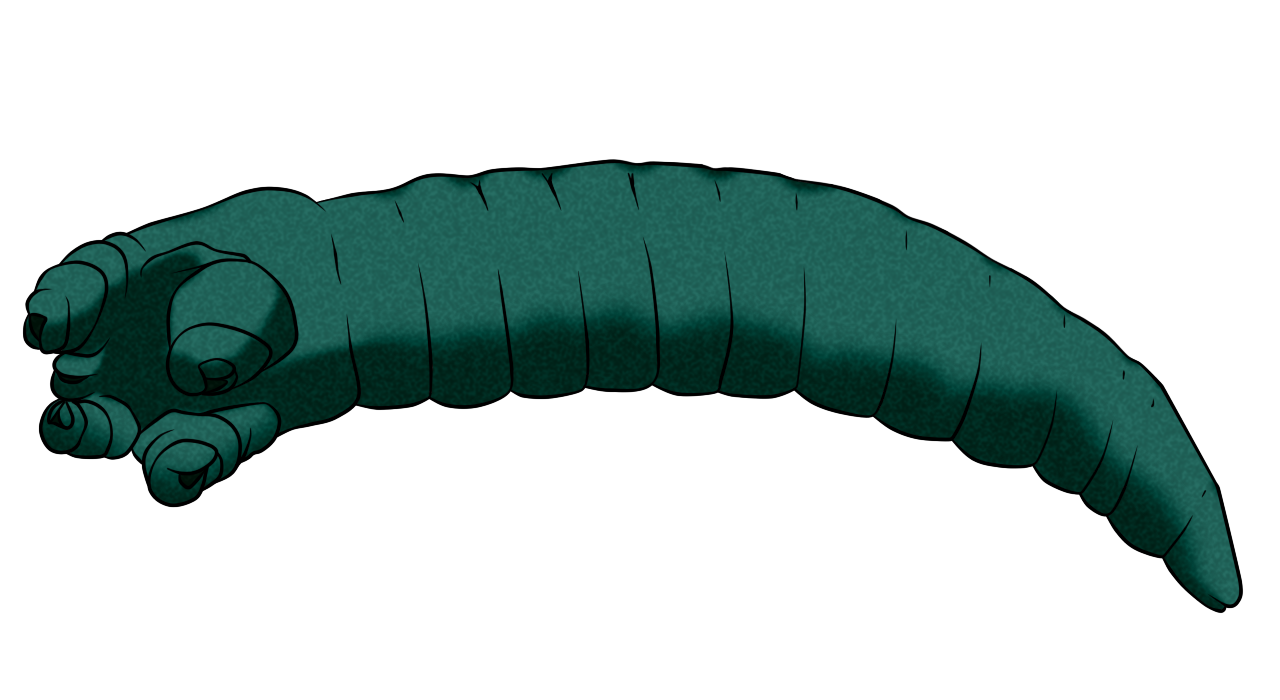
- A reconstruction of Aengapentastomum

Scientific classification
- Kingdom: Animalia
- Phylum: Arthropoda
- Class: Ichthyostraca
- Subclass: Pentastomida
- Genus: †Aengapentastomum; Waloszek, Repetski & Maas, 2005
- Species: †A. andresi

Binomial name
- †Aengapentastomum andresi Waloszek, Repetski & Maas, 2005

= Aengapentastomum =

Aengapentastomum Temporal range: Upper Cambrian

Extinct genus of pentastomid

Aengapentastomum is a Cambrian genus of pentastomid from the Orsten of Sweden, containing one species, Aengapentastomum andresi.

== Description ==
Aengapentastomum is roughly 730 micrometers long from head to tail. Unlike other Cambrian pentastomids, it lacks vestigial trunk limbs, therefore it is likely closer to the crown-group. It has two pairs of head limbs, both smooth and rounded, with inward-facing podomeres. A swelling of unknown function, likely akin to the "dorsal organs" of modern pentastomid larvae, occurs roughly half-way down the length of the body. The tail has a rounded end, with two structures at its tip. The head is subtriangular, with no head shield, despite a furrow around the appendages and a prominent margin giving the effect of one at some angles. The trunk is unsegmented, with seemingly no annulations either. Aengapentastomum is known from one complete specimen, with an earlier described larva also resembling it, however this larva is much smaller and only has one pair of appendages, therefore it is likely either an earlier developmental stage or a close relative. This genus, alongside other Orsten pentastomids, is likely a larval form with the adults not being preserved.

== Etymology ==
Aengapentastomum derives from the Änga quarry where it was found, alongside the fact it is a pentastomid. The species name andresi honours Dietmar Andres, who first described pentastomid fossils from the Orsten.

== See also ==
- Boeckelericambria
- Heymonsicambria
- Haffnericambria
