= Linguatulosis =

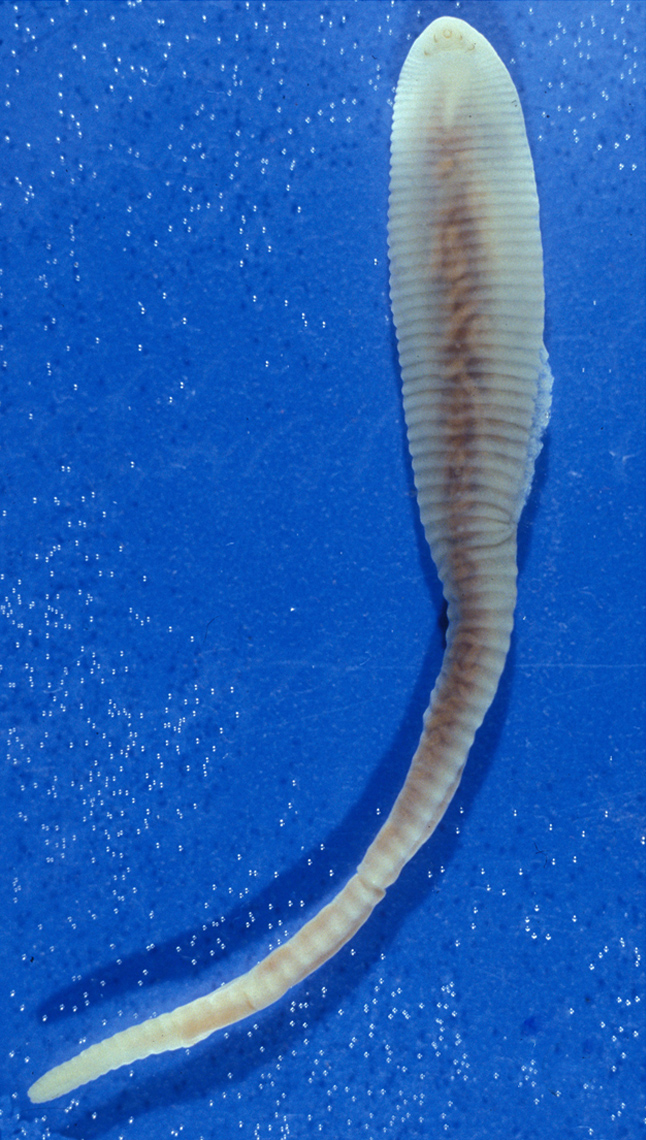
- Adult female Linguatula serrata
- Specialty: Infectious disease

Linguatulosis is a condition associated with the organism Linguatula serrata.

The usual final host for Linguatula serrata is a carnivore, like a dog or jackal, and the species is sometimes known as the dog tongueworm for this reason.

More generally, linguatulosis can be considered a form of "pentastomiasis", which refers to all diseases caused by pentastomids, including porocephaliasis.

This disease is often accidentally identified during autopsy because of its asymptomatic effect on the body.

Human infestation by Linguatula was historically more commonplace than is sometimes realised. Human liver autopsies in Berlin from the early part of the 20th century revealed an infection rate of nearly 12%.

== Signs and symptoms ==
It is usually asymptomatic unless the complication and infection is severe. But in some recorded cases, symptoms include nasopharyngitis accompanied by pain, itching of throat and ears. Coughing, hemoptysis and vomiting are verifiable indications as well as sneezing, bleeding, dyspnea, and inflammation.

== Visceral and nasopharyngeal ==
Humans can become infected in two ways: either as an intermediate host (visceral linguatuliasis) or as an accidental final host (nasopharyngeal linguatuliasis).

- In visceral linguatuliasis Linguatula eggs are sneezed or defecated out by the primary host. Normally they would be eaten by a herbivorous mammal (the intermediate host), including various domestic animals . The eggs hatch in the intestines and the resulting larvae burrow their way into the visceral cavity of the body. Here they form cysts or granulomas, typically in the liver or the lymph nodes. This can also occur in humans if the eggs are accidentally swallowed, although the victim may not be aware of the infestation and misdiagnosis as liver disease can even occur . Rarely, the larvae of both Lingulatula and Armillifer can enter the eye accidentally
- In nasopharyngeal linguatuliasis it is the encysted larvae which are consumed, usually via raw or poorly cooked meat. Once in the stomach, the larvae become liberated from their cysts within a couple of hours and then crawl up the oesophagus and establish themselves in the nose, pharynx or lungs — holding themselves in place with the hooks flanking the mouth . Presence of the parasite can induce headaches, coughing and nasal discharge which help to spread the infection. Nasopharyngeal linguatuliasis appears to be quite prevalent throughout the Middle East where it is often known as the Halzoun syndrome after religious festivals in which infected raw meat is consumed . In Sudan nasopharyngeal linguatuliasis is known as Marrara syndrome; Marrara is a popular local dish prepared from raw offal. It has been suggested that up to 20% of the population in some parts of Sudan may be affected by this syndrome at some stage of their lives .

== Transmission ==
Eating raw or semi-cooked infected liver or lymph nodes infected with nymphal L. serrata causes severe symptoms in the human nasopharynx. Submaxillary and cervical lymph nodes sometimes enlarge and the neck is swollen. Complications include abscesses in the auditory canals, facial paralysis, and enlarged tonsils producing asphyxiation. These symptoms are well recognized as a disease called “halzoun syndrome” in Lebanon and nearby countries.

In Egypt, infected camels and buffalo may also be a source of infection for dogs, which are companions of man in desert and semi-desert areas where grazing is a major profession, and in villages, where dogs are also common. Infected dogs, in turn, are a source of infection to man who may be an intermediate host.

== Treatment ==
An antibiotic therapy for secondary infections caused by the parasite is available, but surgical removal is usually the only way to get rid of the parasites.
