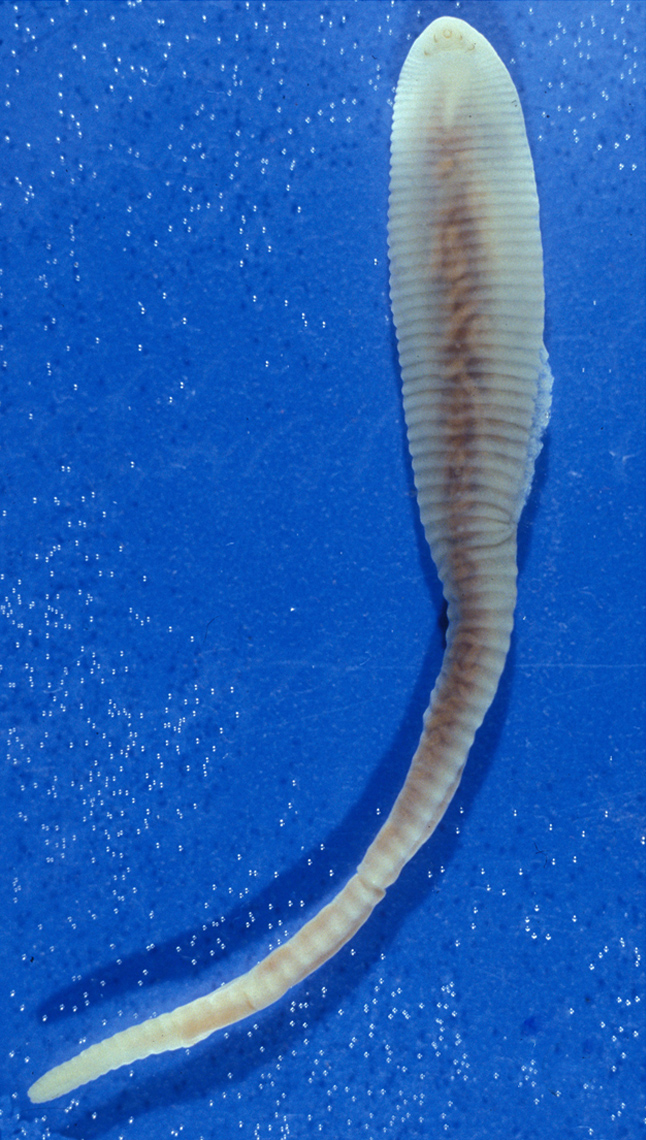
- Female

Scientific classification
- Kingdom: Animalia
- Phylum: Arthropoda
- Clade: Pancrustacea
- Class: Ichthyostraca
- Order: Porocephalida
- Family: Linguatulidae
- Genus: Linguatula
- Species: L. serrata

Binomial name
- Linguatula serrata Frölich, 1789

= Linguatula serrata =

Species of crustacean

Linguatula serrata is a species of cosmopolitan zoonotic parasite, belonging to the tongueworm order Pentastomida. They are wormlike parasites of the respiratory systems of vertebrates. They live in the nasopharyngeal region of mammals. Cats, dogs, foxes, and other carnivores are normal hosts of this parasite. Apparently, almost any mammal is a potential intermediate host.

== Description ==
The adult parasite is dorsoventrally flattened, tapering backwards, resembling a vertebrate tongue thus, inspiring the common name of "tongueworm".

Physical characteristics; males: 18–20 millimetres (0.71–0.79 in) in length, while the females are 80–120 mm (3.1–4.7 in).

== Distribution ==
L. serrata can be found worldwide but especially in warm subtropical and temperate regions.

== Behavior and ecology ==
=== Life cycle ===
Adult L. serrata embeds their forebody into the nasopharyngeal mucosa, feeding on blood and fluids. Females live at least two years and produce millions of eggs. Eggs exit the host in nasal secretion or if swallowed, with feces. When swallowed by an intermediate host, the four-legged larvae (resembling a mite) hatch in the small intestine, penetrate the intestinal wall, and lodge in tissues, particularly in lungs, liver, and lymph nodes. The nymphal stage develops. When eaten by a definitive host, infective nymphs either attach in the upper digestive tract or quickly travel there from the stomach, reaching the nasopharynx. Females begin egg production in about six months.

=== Reproduction ===
Both male and females are required to mate for successful reproduction. Males choose to mate with females that are close to their own size. Females contain hundreds of thousands of eggs.

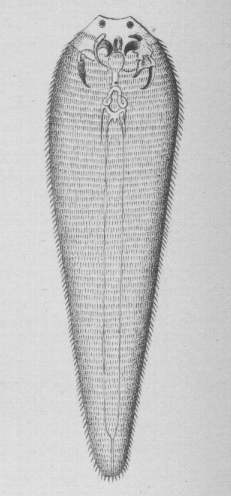
Larva of last stage

== Disease ==
Linguatulosis is a condition associated with the organism Linguatula serrata. More generally, linguatulosis can be considered a form of "pentastomiasis", which refers to all diseases caused by pentastomids, including porocephaliasis.

This disease is often accidentally identified during autopsy because of its asymptomatic effect on the body.

=== Epidemiology ===
Among Linguatula serrata infecting Cairo street dogs, 10% were juveniles, 59% were males, and 31% were females, corresponding to a sex ratio of 1.9:1. Of all infections, 67% were found during spring and summer, compared to 33% during fall and winter. The probable source of canine infections is infected lymph nodes of cattle, sheep, goats, and/or camels, which produce the symptoms of halzoun and the marrara syndrome in man when consumed raw.
