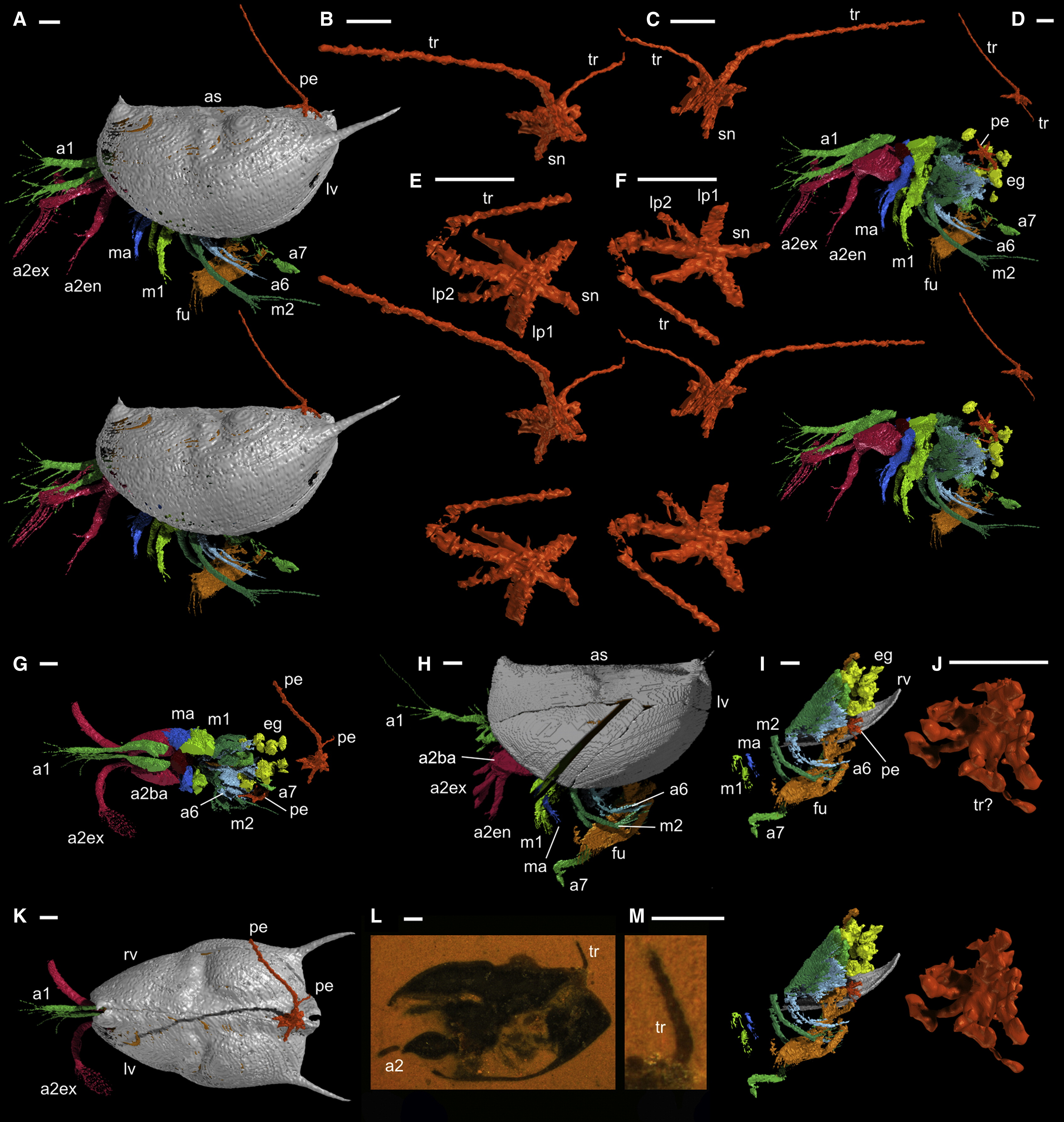
- I. piratica (B-F) and its host, Nymphatelina gravida

Scientific classification
- Kingdom: Animalia
- Phylum: Arthropoda
- Class: Ichthyostraca
- Subclass: Pentastomida
- Order: Cephalobaenida
- Genus: †Invavita; Siveter et al., 2015
- Species: †I. piratica

Binomial name
- †Invavita piratica Siveter et al., 2015

= Invavita =

Invavita Temporal range: Ludlow, 425 Ma

Genus of extinct pentastomid

Invavita piratica is an extinct, parasitic species of tongue worm, provisionally assigned to the order Cephalobaenida, from Herefordshire Lagerstätte, Ludlow-aged England. It possessed a head, a worm-like body, and two pairs of limbs.

The 425-million-year-old Silurian fossil holotype specimen was found still attached to its fossilised host, a specimen of the ostracod Nymphatelina gravida, at an undisclosed location in England. It is now in Oxford University Museum of Natural History. It was first described in the journal Current Biology in 2015.

== Etymology ==
The generic name is a New Latin compound word combining "invasor" and "avitus," and roughly translates as "ancient intruder." The specific name refers to piracy; both names referring directly to the organism's obvious parasitic lifestyle.
