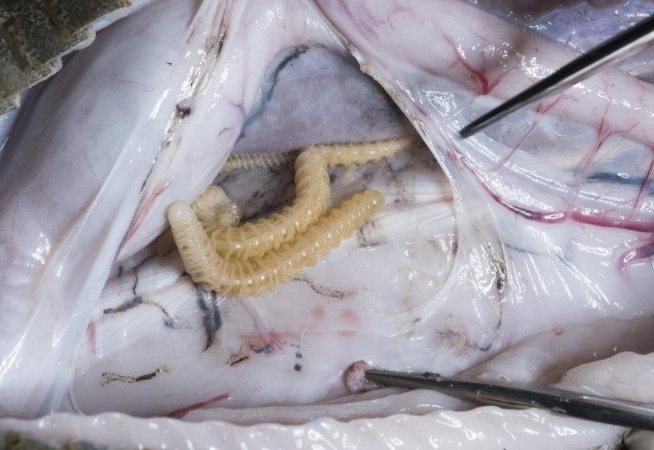
- Adult specimens in Bitis nasicornis at a rural bushmeat market, Democratic Republic of the Congo

Scientific classification
- Kingdom: Animalia
- Phylum: Arthropoda
- Clade: Pancrustacea
- Class: Ichthyostraca
- Order: Porocephalida
- Family: Porocephalidae
- Genus: Armillifer
- Species: A. grandis

Binomial name
- Armillifer grandis (Hett, 1915)

Synonyms
- Porocephalus grandis Hett, 1915

= Armillifer grandis =

Species of crustacean

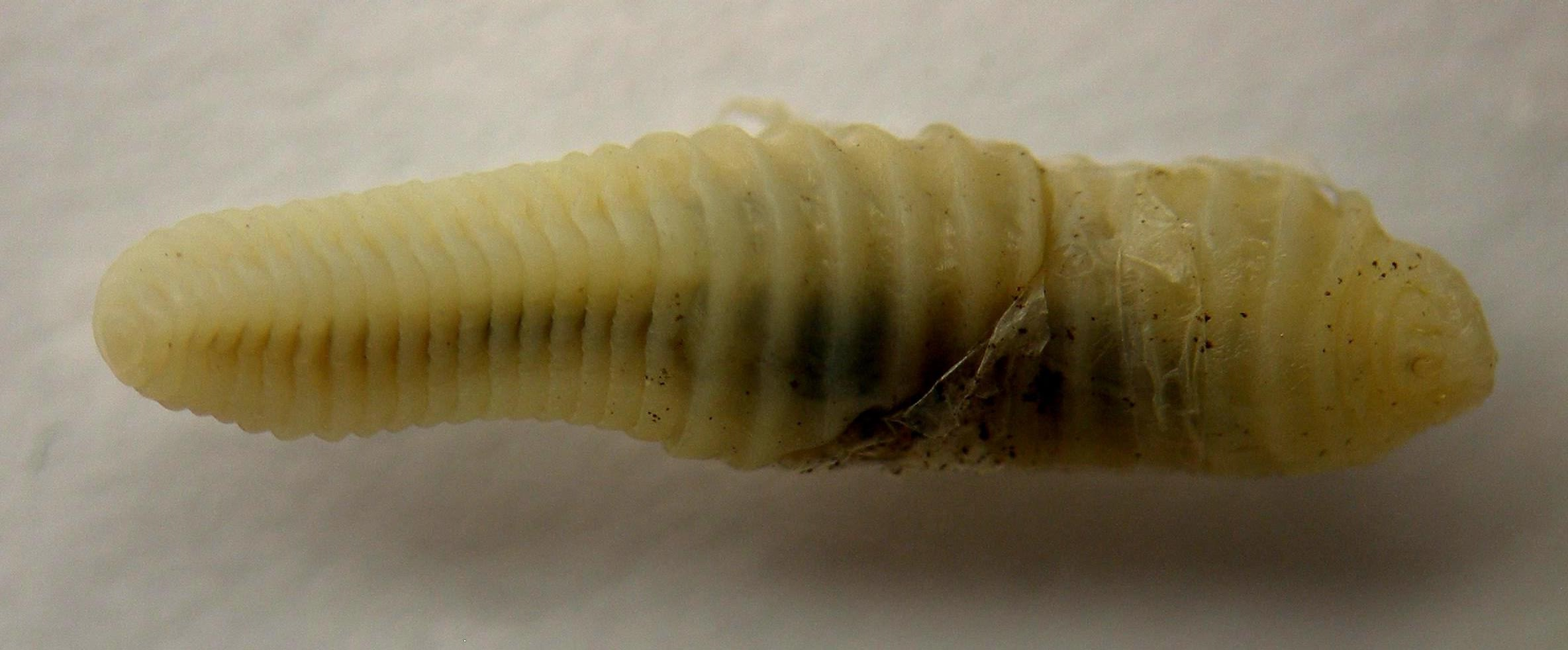
A nymph (=larva) removed from the eye of a blind patient

Surgical removal of a nymph from the human eye

Armillifer grandis is a species of tongue worm in the subclass Pentastomida found in tropical Central and West Africa. Its typical definitive hosts are viperid snakes (such as Bitis gabonica, Bitis nasicornis, and Cerastes cerastes), while rodents are presumed to act as intermediate hosts. Humans may become accidentally infected by the eggs, particularly if consuming (or otherwise contacting) infected snakes. Ingested eggs develop into nymphs that invade different visceral organs, causing a disease that is often called porocephalosis. Most human infections are asymptomatic, although some cases are debilitating and even lethal. Abdominal infections are more widespread, but typically undiagnosed, while ocular manifestations are rare and may cause blindness.

Most of the vipers sold for human consumption at the rural bushmeat markets in the Democratic Republic of Congo host A. grandis.
