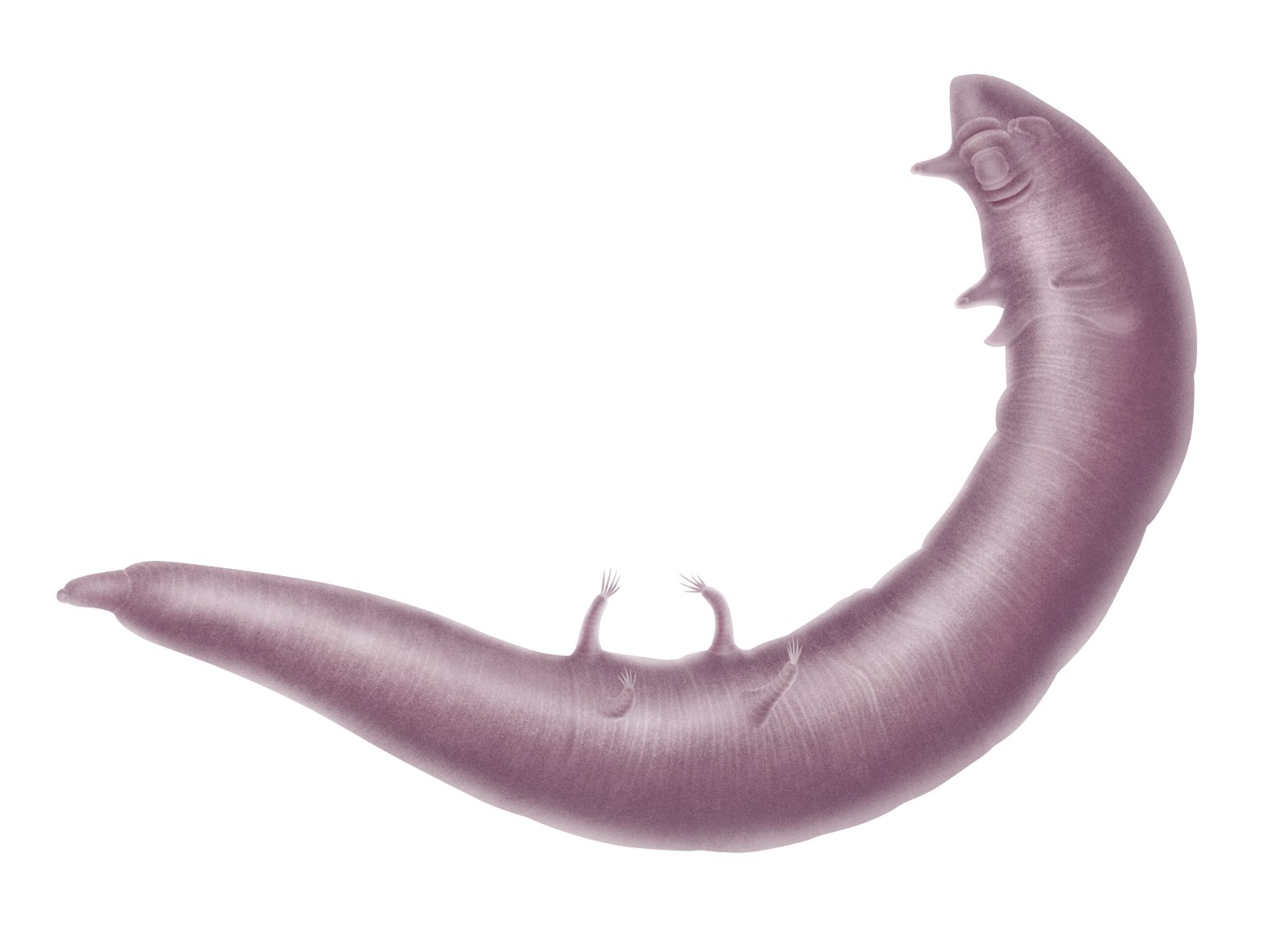
- Reconstruction of Dietericambria

Scientific classification
- Kingdom: Animalia
- Phylum: Arthropoda
- Clade: Pancrustacea
- Class: Ichthyostraca
- Subclass: Pentastomida
- Genus: †Dietericambria; Peel 2022
- Species: †D. hensoniensis

Binomial name
- †Dietericambria hensoniensis Peel 2022

= Dietericambria =

Dietericambria Temporal range: Wuliuan

Extinct genus of pentastomid

Dietericambria is an extinct genus of Cambrian pentastomids from the Henson Gletscher Formation of Greenland. It is the oldest known pentastomid, being at least 15 million years older than the forms recorded from the Orsten. The genus contains a single species, Dietericambria hensoniensis.

== Description ==
Dietericambria was at least 1.2 mm long, with cylindrical segments. (Due to it only being known from fragmentary specimens, any lengths are purely estimates.) It resembles Aengapentastomum, however it has much smaller, unsegmented head limbs. Dietericambria also has an unusual complex of flanges on the ventral surface of the head. The trunk seems to have had limbs, with their sockets being preserved, however their shape is unknown. Unusually, instead of the lateral position of Orsten pentastomids, these limbs are positioned ventrally, similar to that of tardigrades. While hooks similar to the cephalic hooks of modern pentastomids are known from the same formation, they were likely from much larger forms, possibly adults of the species. The position of the mouth is unknown, and while the circular pillar within the flange complex does appear to be a mouth, further examination shows it has the same papillae as the rest of the integument. Dietericambria seems to have been parasitic, as suggested by the flange complex and cephalic limbs, alongside the possible hooks, however what it parasitised is unclear, with both conodonts and dinocaridids being proposed due to their abundant nature and soft bodies. Whether it was endoparasitic or ectoparasitic is also unclear.

== Etymology ==
Dietericambria honours Dieter Walossek, who helped describe numerous Orsten fossils including stem-pentastomids, alongside acknowledging the age of the fossil. The species name hensoniensis reflects its origin from the Henson Gletscher Formation.
