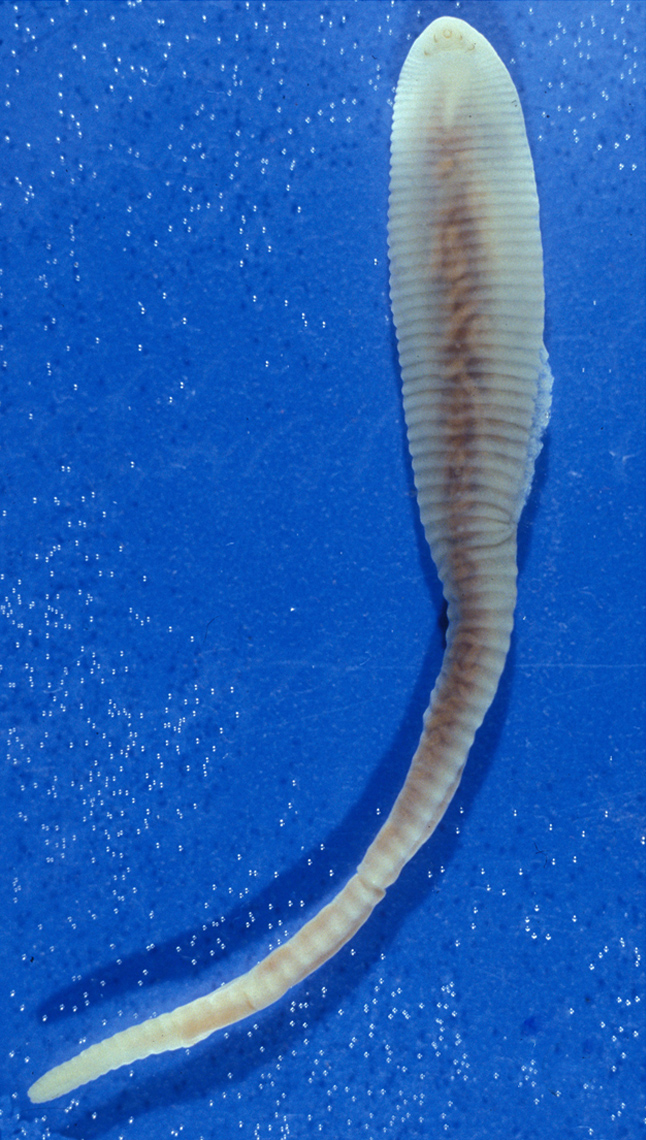
- Linguatula serrata

Scientific classification
- Kingdom: Animalia
- Phylum: Arthropoda
- Class: Ichthyostraca
- Order: Porocephalida
- Family: Linguatulidae
- Genus: Linguatula; Frölich, 1789

Synonyms
- Prionoderma Cuvier, 1817

= Linguatula =

Genus of crustaceans

Linguatula is a genus of crustaceans belonging to the family Linguatulidae. The genus has a cosmopolitan distribution.

== Species ==
There are four species recognised in the genus Linguatula:

- Linguatula arctica Riley, Haugerud & Nilssen, 1987
- Linguatula multiannulata Haffner & Rack, 1969
- Linguatula recurvata (Diesing, 1850)
- Linguatula serrata Frölich, 1789
