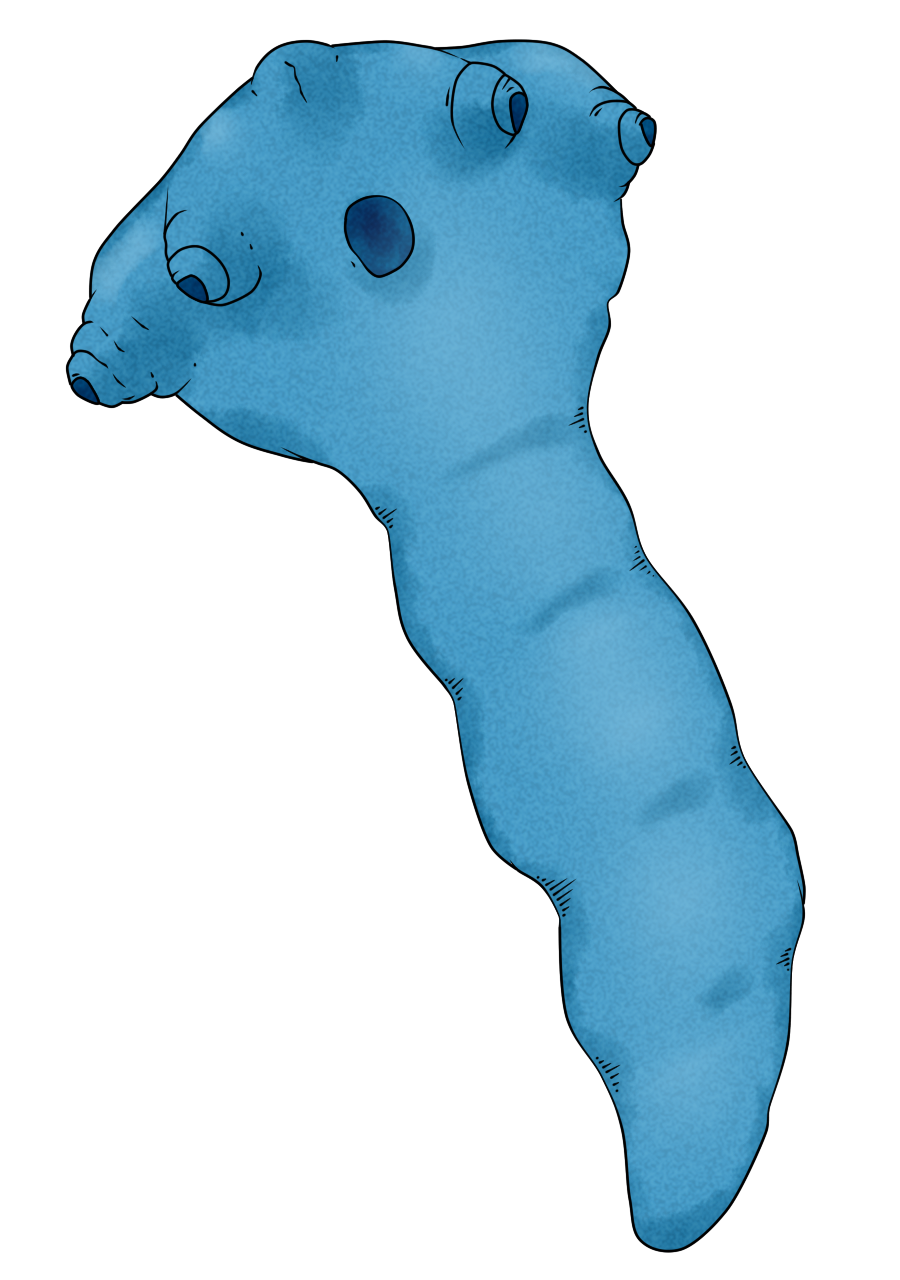
- A reconstruction of Haffnericambria

Scientific classification
- Kingdom: Animalia
- Phylum: Arthropoda
- Class: Ichthyostraca
- Subclass: Pentastomida
- Genus: †Haffnericambria; Walossek and Müller, 1994
- Species: †H. trolmeniensis

Binomial name
- †Haffnericambria trolmeniensis Walossek and Müller, 1994

= Haffnericambria =

Haffnericambria Temporal range: Upper Cambrian

Extinct genus of pentastomid

Haffnericambria is a Cambrian genus of pentastomid from the Orsten of Sweden, containing one species, H. trolmeniensis.

== Description ==
Haffnericambria is roughly 730 micrometers long. It somewhat resembles Boeckelericambria in appearance, however without the near-mouth appendages. It also has much smaller and more compact head limbs, alongside a more "hammer-headed" appearance. Oddly, the vestigial trunk limbs have not preserved, with only small sockets indicating their original location. While the mouth is present on a swelling at the front of the head, it is very small and likely nonfunctional. The head rapidly tapers behind the limbs, smoothly blending into the trunk. The trunk segments are slightly bulged in the middle, however the boundaries are rather indistinct. The rear is not preserved, however it was likely similar to that of Boeckelericambria's. This genus, alongside other Orsten pentastomids, is likely a larval form with the adults not being preserved.

== Etymology ==
Haffnericambria is named in honour of K. von Haffner, alongside being in reference to the Cambrian age of the fossil. The species name trolmiensis refers to the type locality of Trolmen.
