= Oncopoda =

Scientific classification
- Kingdom: Animalia
- (unranked): Articulata

Proposed group of animals

Oncopoda is a hypothetical group of animals comprising the Onychophora, Tardigrada and Pentastomida.
