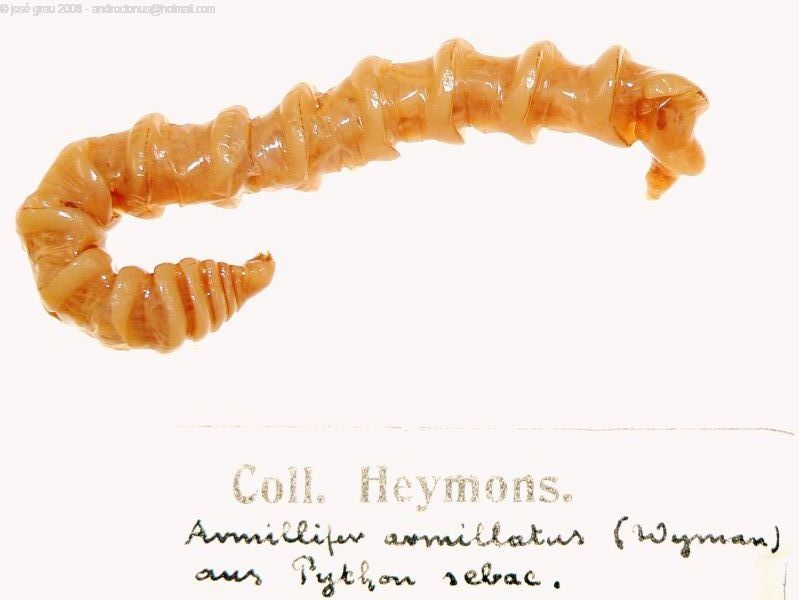
- Armillifer armillatus from the respiratory tract of Python sebae

Scientific classification
- Kingdom: Animalia
- Phylum: Arthropoda
- Class: Ichthyostraca
- Order: Porocephalida
- Family: Porocephalidae
- Subfamily: Armilliferinae
- Genus: Armillifer; Sambon, 1922

Synonyms
- Ligamifer Heymons, 1932

= Armillifer =

Genus of crustaceans

Armillifer is a genus of tongue worms in the subclass Pentastomida. It contains the following species:

- Armillifer aborealis Riley & Self, 1981
- Armillifer agkistrodontis Self & Kuntz, 1966
- Armillifer armillatus (Wyman, 1845)
- Armillifer australis Heymons, 1935
- Armillifer grandis (Hett, 1915)
- Armillifer mazzai (Sambon, 1922)
- Armillifer moniliformis (Diesing, 1836)
- Armillifer yoshidai Kishida, 1928

== Interactions with humans ==
Obligate parasites, Armillifer worms had been linked to human disease as early as 1847, although infections are rare and are caused by human consumption of undercooked meat of a host. The majority of infections are caused by the tropical African species Armillifer armillatus. Only 45% of patients in one study experienced symptoms from the infection. Unfortunately, 67% of patients with worm infections in their eyes were driven permanently blind by the parasite.
