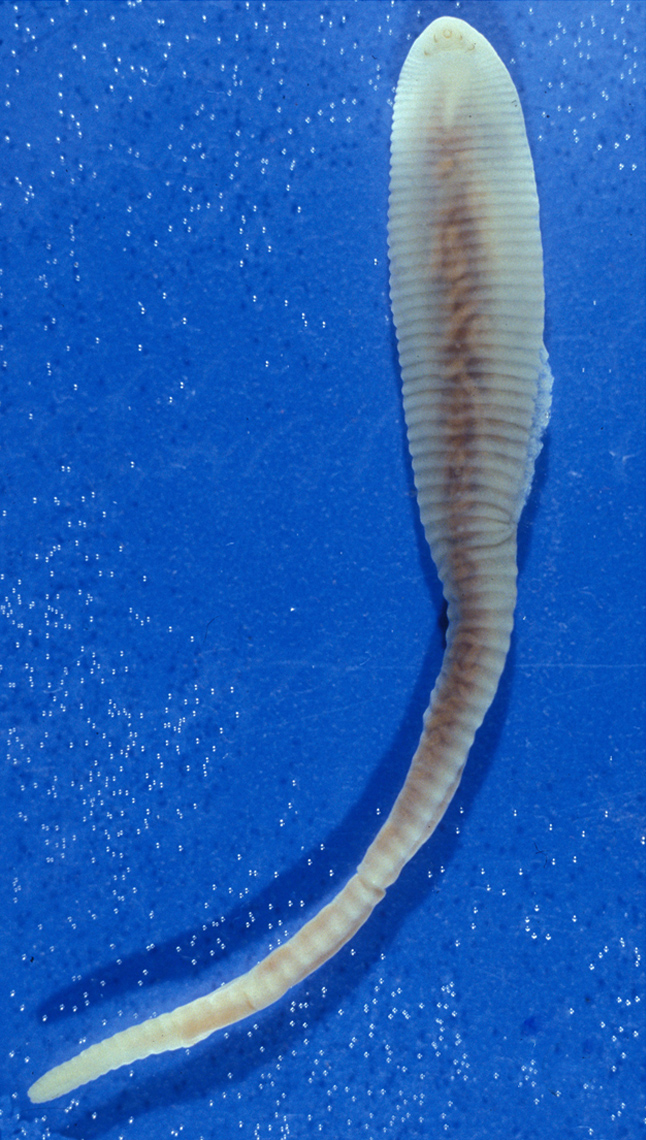
- Linguatula serrata

Scientific classification
- Kingdom: Animalia
- Phylum: Arthropoda
- Class: Ichthyostraca
- Order: Porocephalida
- Superfamily: Linguatuloidea
- Family: Linguatulidae; Haldeman, 1851

Synonyms
- Linguatulidae Vogt, 1851

= Linguatulidae =

Family of crustaceans

Linguatulidae is a family of crustaceans belonging to the order Porocephalida.

== Genera ==
The following genera are recognised in the family Linguatulidae:

- Linguatula Frölich, 1789
- Neolinguatula Haffner & Rack, 1969
- Tetragulus Bosc, 1811
