= Illegal fishing in Africa =

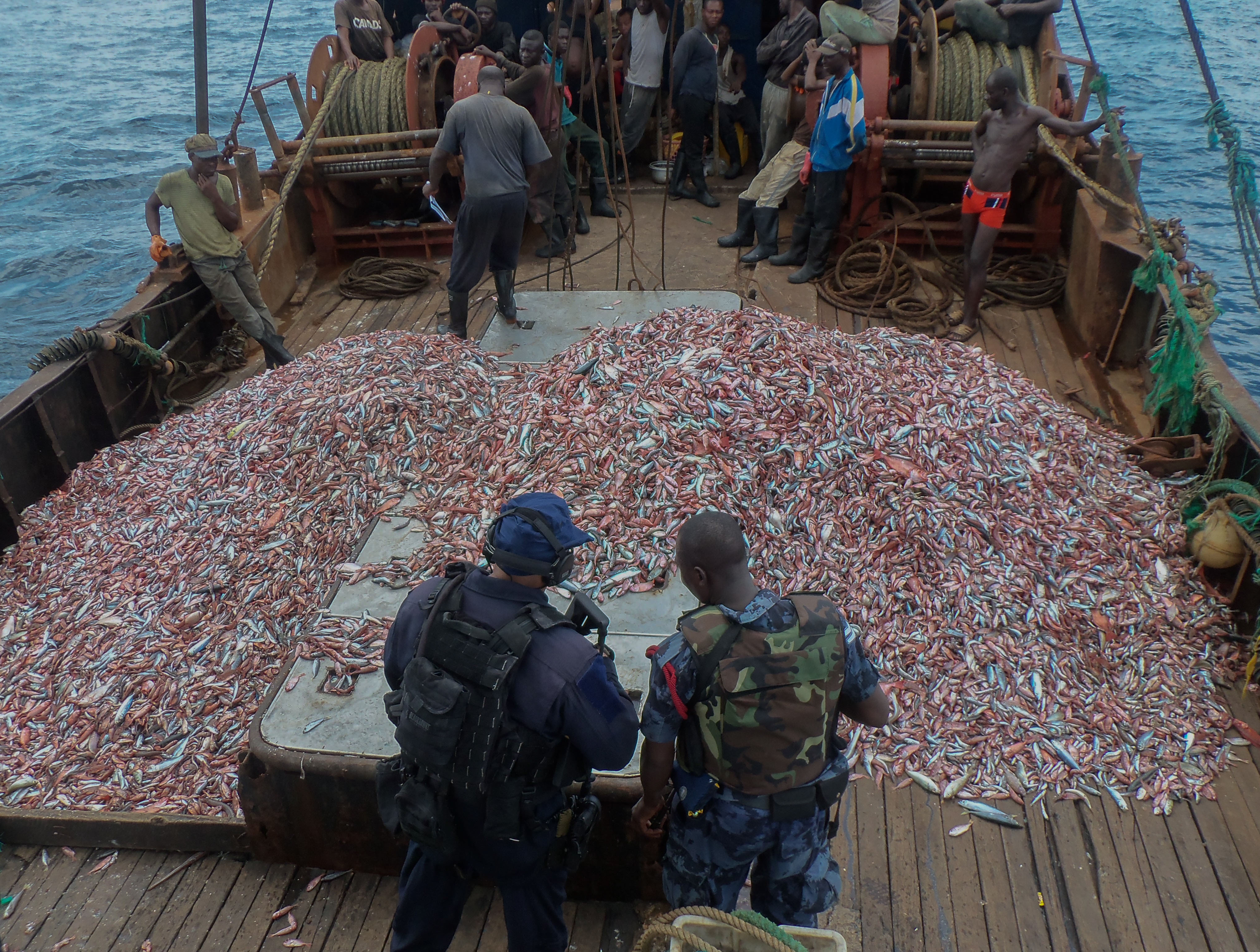
Inspection of fishing vessel suspected of illegal fishing in the Gulf of Guinea by a U.S. Coast Guard law enforcement detachment member and a Ghanaian navy sailor.

African illegal fishing is the unlawful activity of obtaining fish and other aquatic species for various purposes in African waters. Fishing outside local, national, and international regulations causes the disturbance of aquatic and terrestrial ecosystems in the countries of Africa. People living in local African communities may fish illegally in order to improve their income and lifestyle. On a larger scale, illegal fishing in Africa takes place when vessels from foreign countries are stationed on African waters without any legal documentation that allows fishing. Illegal fishing in Africa is one of the main causes of overfishing, and increases the spread of diseases. In Africa, the Chinese commercial fishing fleet is responsible for more illegal, unreported and unregulated fishing (IUU) fishing than that of any other nation.

== Environmental and human health impacts ==
Illegal fishing in African waters is causing the fast decline of marine and freshwater species that maintain stable marine and terrestrial ecosystems. By reducing the diversity of species in these marine ecosystems, the natural food chain is distorted. When a key species is over-fished, other species' populations start to increase significantly. When a species loses its natural predator, it becomes easier for the species to survive and reproduce. Oftentimes the overpopulation of specific species, aquatic or terrestrial, can have negative effects on the ecosystem, including humans' health.

=== Spread of disease ===
Some species of freshwater snails from the family Planorbidae are the main source of food for many species of fish being over-fished illegally. These snails are the intermediate hosts of a variety of disease-causing parasites that are transmitted to humans. For example, Schistosomiasis is one of the diseases caused by a parasite carried by freshwater snails which mainly affects children. This disease does not allow the normal development in children. Schistosomiasis affects the growth in children and the ability to develop their intellectual skills. Schistosomiasis is the second most common neglected tropical disease caused by a parasite in sub-Saharan Africa and is part of the deaths of about 534,000 persons every year. With a larger population of Planorbidae freshwater snails, the probability of humans, especially children, having contact with the snails is much higher. Thus, humans are more vulnerable of getting infected with this disease and many others serious diseases. Overfishing disturbs the balance of the ecosystems where the lack of laws and/or implementation a laws is having consequences on communities that depend on these ecosystems.

=== Economy ===
The economy of African countries has declined as the result of illegal fishing. Illegal fishing affects small businesses that benefit from tourism since these small businesses cannot obtain the sufficient amounts of fish necessary to supply sport-fishing tourists' demands. The decline in the economy is causing a large population of African people to emigrate to European countries in order to find a job that allows them to meet their daily necessities. According to Moenieba Isaacs and Emma Witbooi, illegal fishing produces between 828 million and 1.6 billion US dollars from fishing illegally in the Eastern Central Atlantic every year. Most of the time the revenue obtained from illegal fishing goes to large foreign companies, while local people only receive a small portion. Over 200 million Africans depend on fish for nutritional purposes and 10 million Africans benefit financially from fish. Illegal immigration caused by the lack of marine resources is not always the adequate solution. Many African citizens are forced to travel in boats that are in bad conditions. People get lost in the ocean and many times die trying to arrive to a European country.

=== Bushmeat ===
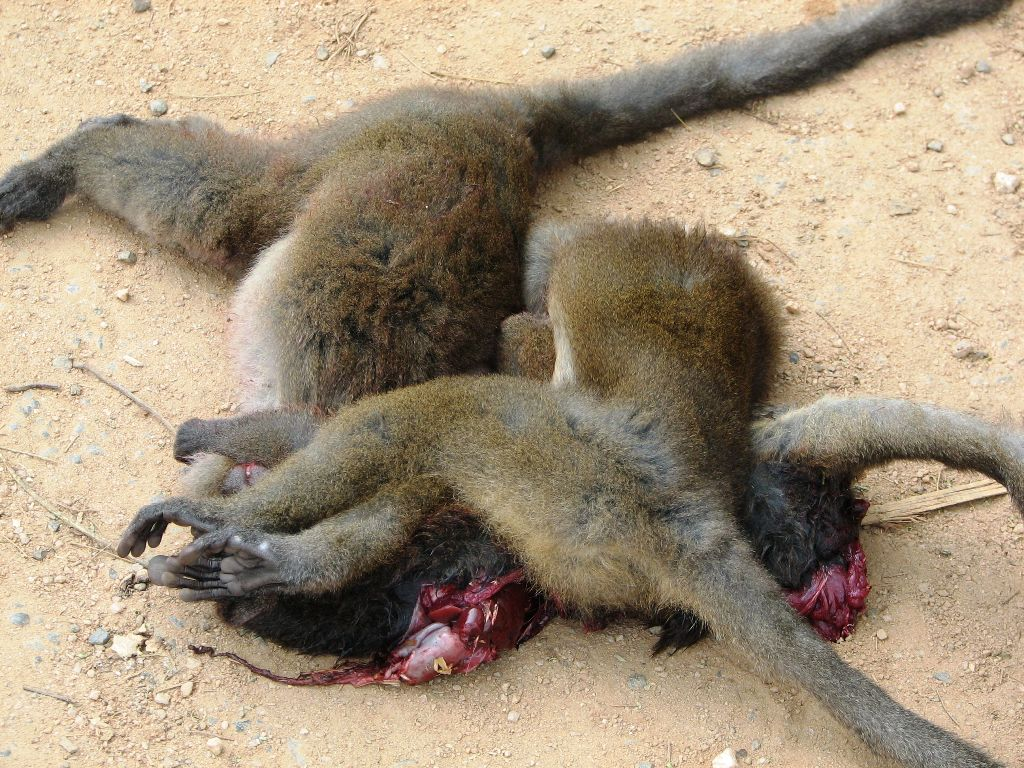
Poaching of Eastern Lesser Bamboo Lemurs (Hapalemur griseus) for bushmeat in northeast Madagascar.

African communities greatly depend on seafood and terrestrial wild animals to obtain their daily portion of proteins. According to the article "Do bushmeat consumers have other fish to fry?" the amount of wild animals that are hunted for bushmeat increases when the production of fish decreases. People who live close to the coast of African countries such as the communities in Ghana not only rely on fishing to obtain their daily protein, but fishing is their source of employment. When overfishing caused by illegal fishing reduces the seafood stock, African people risk their life and hunt dangerous and/or protected animals. These people face two major risks during hunting for bushmeat; they can be killed by the wild animals they are trying to hunt or they can be shot by the rangers who are protecting endangered wild animals living within protected area boundaries.

=== Illegally caught species ===
Marine species populations are slowly becoming more and more vulnerable and some are entering the list of endangered species. Sharks and sea turtles are some of the aquatic species being overfished for their high value on the market. Added to these species, many other fish species are also overfished, reducing the food availability for their natural predators.

==== Sharks ====
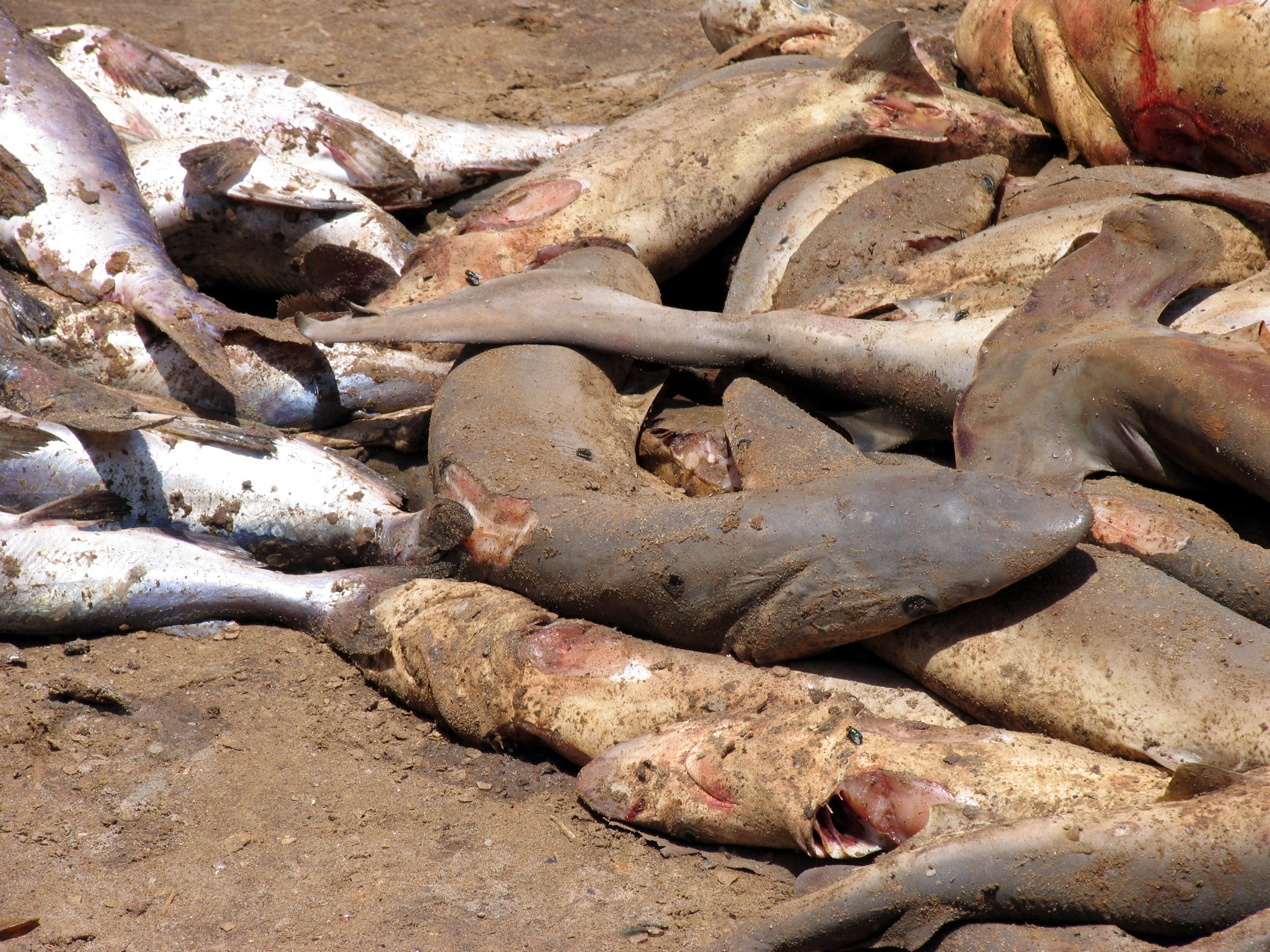
Sharks after the removal of fins.

A 2005 report in the article "Shark Finning" disclosed incidents of illegal shark fishing by a large number of Taiwanese fishing vessels off the coast of Africa, and Middle East in the Western Indian Ocean. Sharks are fished solely for the purpose of removing their fins since shark fins are considered a delicacy in China. Local African men, large scale foreign fisheries, and organized crime syndicates take part on this activity as this is a very lucrative trade.

==== Sea turtles ====
In Africa, the uses of sea turtles are many. Sea turtles are used for African traditional religious and medicinal beliefs. Sea turtle shells are also use to produce artisanal ornaments and souvenirs. Due to the overfishing of fish, local African communities' dependence on sea turtles increases. Sea turtles such as the Hawksbill sea turtle are exploited for their shells which are used largely during festive days when tourists demand for souvenirs increases. Tourism allows small local business to earn an income, thus people exploit turtle populations to increase their earnings. Sea turtles also face indirect threats when commercial and local fisheries catch them during the fishing of other aquatic animals. Many times sea turtles are caught by shark, lobster, and/or fish nets and they are not released back into the water or they die while being trapped on the nets.

== Involvement of outside world ==
=== United States ===
A large amount of the seafood that is consumed by people living in the United States does not always come from legal fishing. Americans eat an estimated 5 billion pounds of seafood every year. Lobsters, which are a well-known seafood dish, are highly requested in American restaurants. Since lobsters have to be imported alive, the prices to ship them is very high. Illegal fisheries may overfish lobsters to receive large monetary benefits. In the mid-2000s, one case in which lobsters were being overfished illegally in South Africa to be imported to the United States was investigated. It was found that 30 percent of the lobsters being shipped to the United States were the result of illegal fishing. As a result, the United States authorities fined the company Hout Bay Fishing $22.5 million for shipping illegally caught lobsters into the United States.

== See also ==
- Maritime industries of Taiwan#Distant-water fishing
