= Halzoun =

Parasitic disease

Halzoun (Arabic:حلزون) is the local name of a buccopharyngeal infection occurring in Lebanon, probably caused by Linguatula serrata, a member of pentastomida larvae. The parasite wanders into the throat of the human host after ingestion of infected raw liver or lymph nodes from sheep or goats. The word Halzoun means "Snail" in Arabic.

Halzoun is considered to be a form of infection with Fasciola, whereby ingestion of infected raw sheep and goat livers may result in the attachment of adult living worms by their suckers to the pharyngeal mucosa causing edema of the soft palate, pharynx and larynx. This edema is accompanied by dyspnea (shortness of breath) and occasionally asphyxia. Other attributions include Dicrocoelium dendriticum or Fasciola hepatica.
