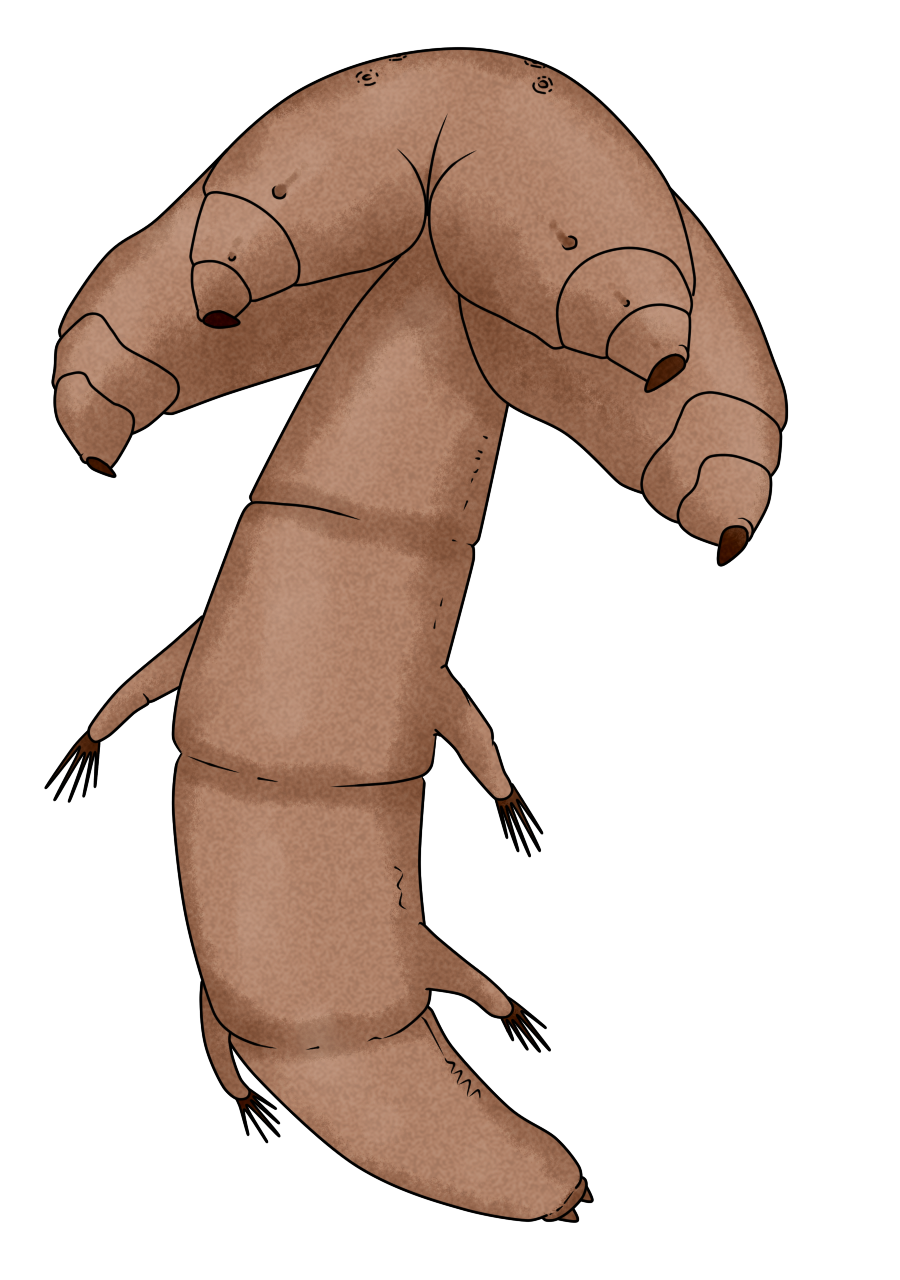
- A reconstruction of Heymonsicambria scandica

Scientific classification
- Kingdom: Animalia
- Phylum: Arthropoda
- Class: Ichthyostraca
- Subclass: Pentastomida
- Genus: †Heymonsicambria; Walossek and Müller, 1994

Type species
- Heymonsicambria kinnekullensis Walossek and Müller, 1994

Species
- H. kinnekullensis; H. scandica; H. repetskii; H. gossmannae; H. taylori

= Heymonsicambria =

Heymonsicambria Temporal range: Upper Cambrian–Tremadocian

Extinct genus of pentastomid

Heymonsicambria is a Cambrian genus of pentastomid from the Orsten of Sweden, containing five species, H. kinnekullensis, H. scandica, H. repetskii, H. taylori and H. gossmannae.

== Description ==
Heymonsicambria varies from 470 micrometers long in H. scandica to 710 micrometers long in H. repetskii. While H. kinnekullensis is incomplete, having broken at the second segment, the other three species have complete fossils. All four species have a dorsoventrally flattened head with two pairs of head limbs on the ventral side. H. repetskii, unusually, has no vestigial trunk limbs, suggesting that this trait is variable within the genus. It also has much smaller head limbs than the other species, which further shows its unusual nature. Alongside this, its head limb sockets are fused with the trunk. H. scandica is relatively similar to H. kinnekullensis, however its head limbs are proportioned differently, with larger "fingers" and its segments are waisted, as opposed to mostly tubular in H. kinnekullensis. H. gossmannae differs from both H. scandica and H. kinnekullensis through its hardly raised head, the roundness of its oral region and orientation of its head limbs. H. kinnekullensis has a head around 2.4 times wider than long, with a relatively sclerotised trunk and small finger-like last podomeres on the head limbs. H. taylori is distinguished by the shape of its head limbs, alongside the length ratios of its trunk portions. It also has partially fused limb sockets, alongside ill-developed limb podomeres, therefore it is likely transitional between H. repetskii and the other species. Unusually, H. taylori is also known from the lowest Ordovician of Canada, thereby being the youngest known record of the genus, and the only one known from outside of Sweden. This genus, alongside other Orsten pentastomids, is likely a larval form with the adults not being preserved.

== Etymology ==
Heymonsicambria honours R. Heymons, alongside deriving from the Cambrian age of the fossil. The species H. kinnekullensis and H. scandica refer to the location of the fossils, the former referring to them being from Kinnekulle and the latter referring to Scandia, the Latin name of a region in southern Sweden. The species H. repetskii honours John Repetski, and H. gossmannae honours Annemarie Gossmann, an assistant of Klaus Müller. H. taylori honours Professor John H. Taylor, who provided the specimens of the pentastomid.
