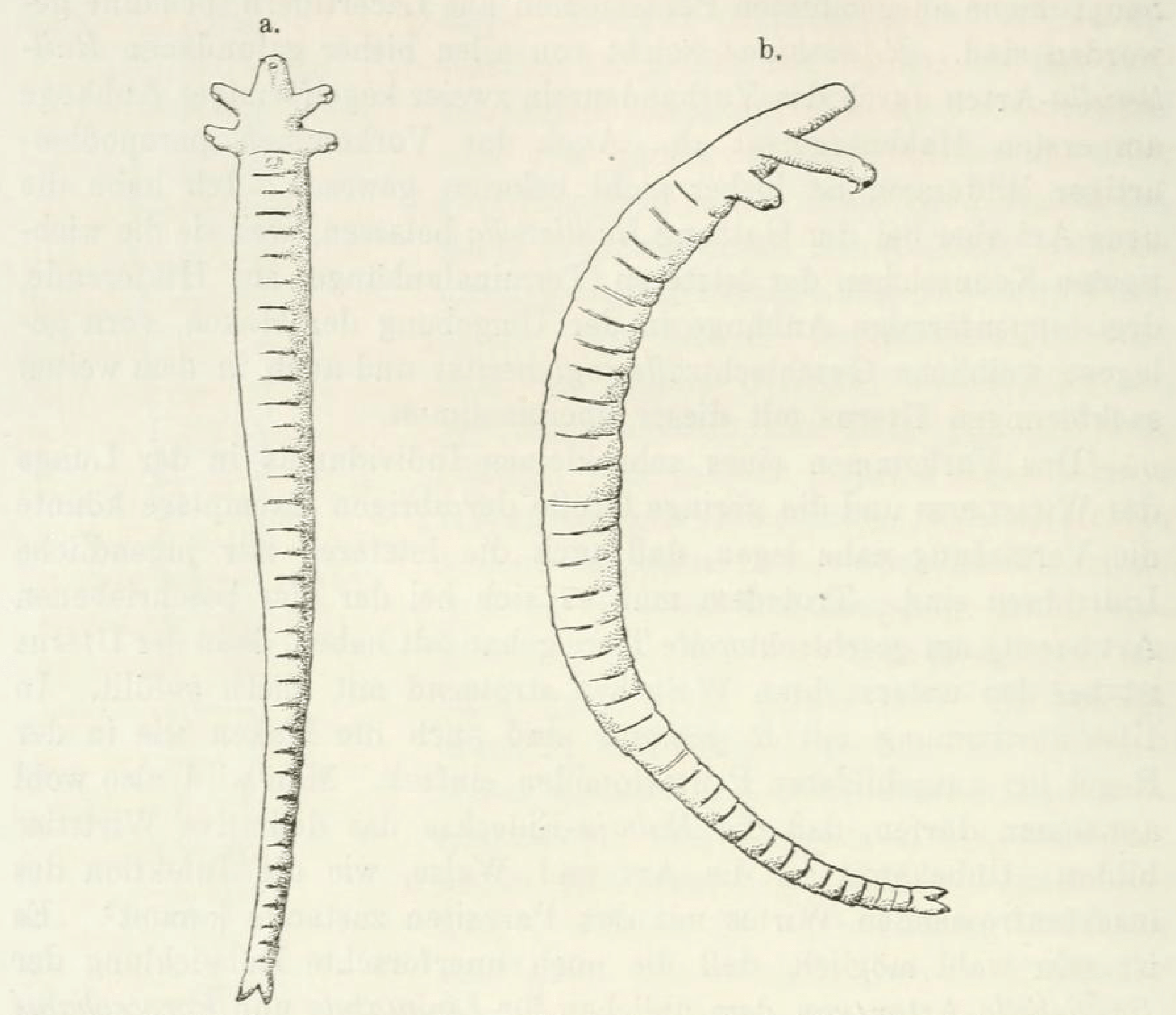
- Illustration of Cephalobaena tetrapoda. Ventral view (a) and right lateral view, with the anterior right parapodium extended (b)

Scientific classification
- Kingdom: Animalia
- Phylum: Arthropoda
- Class: Ichthyostraca
- Subclass: Pentastomida
- Order: Cephalobaenida; Heymons, 1935
- Family: Cephalobaenidae; Heymons, 1922
- Genus: Cephalobaena; Heymons, 1922
- Species: C. tetrapoda

Binomial name
- Cephalobaena tetrapoda Heymons, 1922

= Cephalobaena =

Cephalobaena tetrapoda

Genus of crustaceans

Cephalobaena is a genus of crustaceans in the subclass Pentastomida. It has only one species, Cephalobaena tetrapoda, found in South America parasitizing snakes such as Lygophis lineatus and Crotalus durissus.
