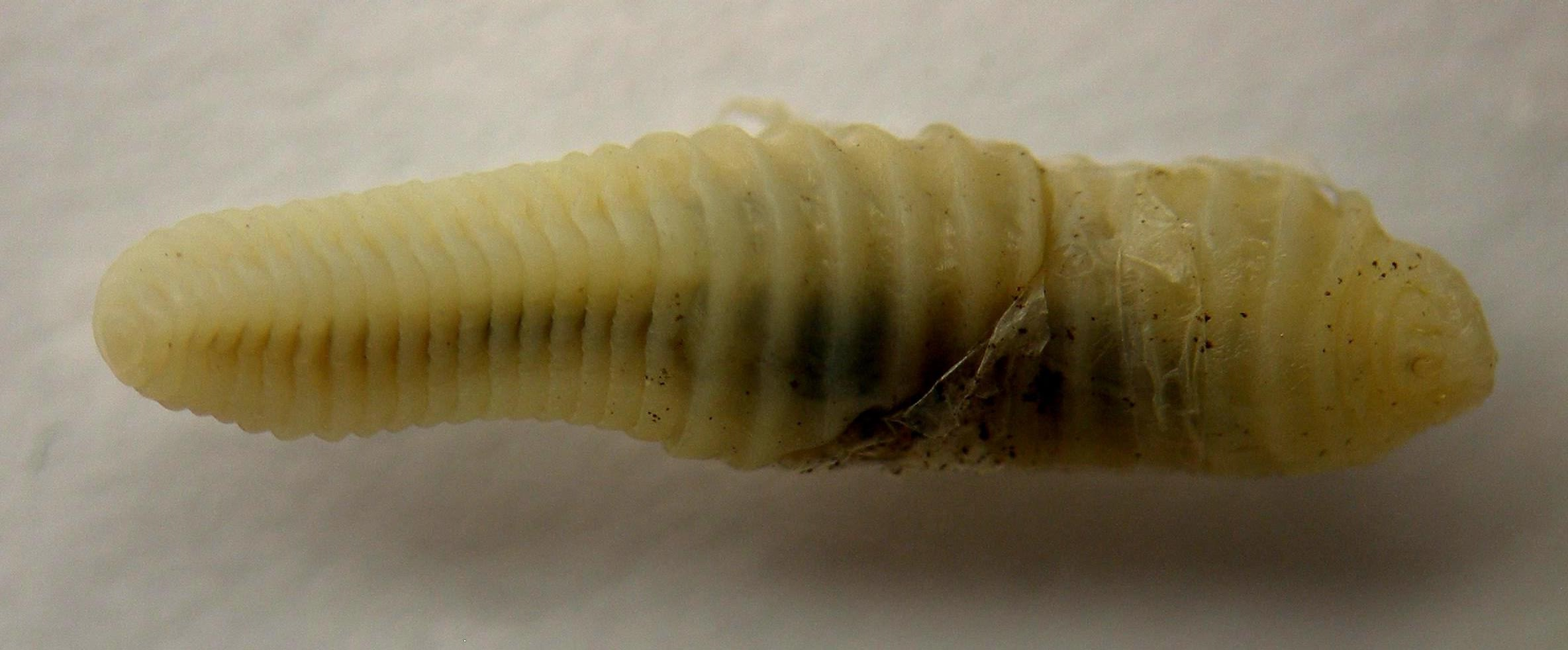
- Armillifer grandis

Scientific classification
- Kingdom: Animalia
- Phylum: Arthropoda
- Class: Ichthyostraca
- Subclass: Pentastomida
- Order: Porocephalida; Heymons, 1935

Superfamilies
- Linguatuloidea Haldeman, 1851; Porocephaloidea Sambon, 1922

Synonyms
- Porocephaliformis Motta, 1963

= Porocephalida =

Order of tongue worms

Porocephalida is an order of tongue worms. Some species in this order, such as Armillifer grandis, have been found in vipers, with some found in vipers from bushmeat markets. At least one species within this order, Subtriquetra subtriquetra, has a free-living larval stage.

== Superfamilies and families ==
There are four families recognised in the order Porocephalida.

- Linguatuloidea
  - Linguatulidae
  - Subtriquetridae
- Porocephaloidea
  - Porocephalidae
  - Sebekidae
