= Richard Heymons =

German zoologist and entomologist (1867–1943)

Richard Heymons (29 May 1867 – 1 December 1943) was a German zoologist and entomologist.

He studied in Humboldt University of Berlin from 1886 to 1891 and provided overall direction of the Institute of Zoology at the higher educational farm in Berlin from 1915 to 1935.

Heymons actively studied tongue worms (Pentastomida) and his collection of these animals is held in the Museum für Naturkunde Berlin. He also coined the name Chelicerata for arachnids and their relatives.

== Publications ==
=== Monographs ===
- The development of the female reproductive organs of Phyllodromica (Blatta) germanica L. 1891
- On the origin of the sex cells in insects. 1893
- The segmentation of the insect body. 1895. (2010, ISBN 978-1-169-58476-1)
- The embryonic development of dermaptera (earwigs) and orthoptera (locusts) – with special reference to cotyledon formation. 1895. (2009, ISBN 978-1-113-68513-1)
- Principles of development and physique of Odonata (Odonata) and Ephemeris (Mayflies). 1896
- A contribution to the evolutionary history of the Insecta apterygota (flying insects ). 1896
- On the morphology of the abdominal appendages in insects. 1896
- On the organization and development of Bacillus rossii (Bacillus rossius) Fabr. 1897
- Contributions to the morphology and evolutionary history of the rhynchotes. 1899
- Biological observations on an Asian solifugae (Pholcidae) together with contributions to the systematics of the same. 1901
- The evolutionary history of the scolopendres (Scolopendra). 1901. (2011, ISBN 978-1-176-06801-8)
- The abdominal appendages of dragonflies and their larvae. 1904
- A placenta in an insect (Hemimerus). 1909

=== Essays ===
- Contribution to the systematics and morphology of Tongue Worms (Pentastomida). In: Zoological Gazette, 1922, 55, pp. 154–167.
- About the dorsal organ of the pentastomida. In: Meeting reports of the Society of Friends of Natural Sciences in Berlin. 1926, pp. 22–24.
- Pentastomida. In: W. Kükenthal, T. Krumbach (eds.): Handbook of Zoology; a natural history of the animal kingdom. 3 (1). Walter de Gruyter, Berlin 1926, pp. 69–128.
- Order: Tongue Worms, Pentastomida (Linguatula). In: P. Brohmer, P. Ehrmann, G. Ulmer (eds.): The animal kingdom of Central Europe. 3 (1). Quelle & Meyer, Leipzig 1928, p. xx.
- Pentastomida of the German Limnological Sunda Expedition. In: Archive for Hydrobiology. 1930. Supplement Volume 3, pp. 193–198.
- A contribution to the knowledge of the pentastomids of Australia and neighboring areas. In: Journal of parasitology. 4, 1932, pp. 409–430.
- A New Pentastomida from the Philippines. – Zoological Indicator 97, 1932, 295–299.
- About an abnormality in a pentastomida (Armillifer moniliformis Diesing). Meeting reports of the Society of Friends of Natural Sciences in Berlin 3, 1932, 287–290.
- About the occurrence of Tongue Worms in birds. – Ornithological Monthly Reports 41, 1933, 75–76.
- with H. Graf Vitzthum: New and little-known pentastomids from America. Zoological Indicator 109, 1935, 150–158.
- Pentastomida. In: Dr. HG Bronn's classes and orders of the animal kingdom. Fifth volume. IV Division, 1st Book. Academic Publishing Company, Leipzig 1935, pp. 1–268.
- with H. Graf Vitzthum: Contributions to the systematics of pentastomids. Journal of Parasitics 8, 1936, 1–103.
- The one from Dr. Edm. Dartevelle in the Belgian Congo State collected Pentastomida. In: Revue de Zoologie et de Botanique Africaines. 33, 1940, pp. 122–123.
- Contributions to the systematics of the pentastomids II. Some remarkable pentastomids from Lacertilia. Journal of Parasitics 10, 1939, 675–690.
- Contributions to the systematics of the Pentastomids III. Pentastomids with spirally curved body shapes. Journal of Parasitics 11, 1939, 77–94.
- On the habits of the Pentastomida found in crocodiles. Report of the meeting of the Society of Friends of Natural Sciences in Berlin, 1940, pp. 253–269.
- Contributions to the systematics of the pentastomids IV. To the knowledge of the Sambonidae. In: Journal of Parasitics, 12, 1941, pp. 317–329.
- Contributions to the systematics of the pentastomids V. The type specimens of Diesingia megastoma. In: Journal of Parasitics, 12, 1941, pp. 330–339.
- Contributions to the systematics of the pentastomids. VI. The species of the genus Alofia in comparison with Sebekia. I. Overview of the species. In: Journal of Parasitics, 12, 1941, pp. 419–432.
- The canine nasal worms (Linguatula serrata Froelich), its hosts and relationships to European wildlife, its origin and practical importance based on our current knowledge. In: Journal of parasitology. 12, 1942, pp. 607–638.
- Pentastomida. In: Institut des Parcs Nationaux du Congo Belge. Exploration du Parc National Albert. Mission GF de Witte 43, 1943, pp. 3–4

== Sources ==
- https://www.idref.fr/138918112
- https://www.hu-berlin.de/de/
- https://www.uni-goettingen.de/de/geschichte/71626.html
- https://www.biodiversitylibrary.org/creator/3857#/titles
- https://www.leopoldina.org/members/members directory/member/3822/
- https://www.jstor.org/stable/41768001?seq=1
