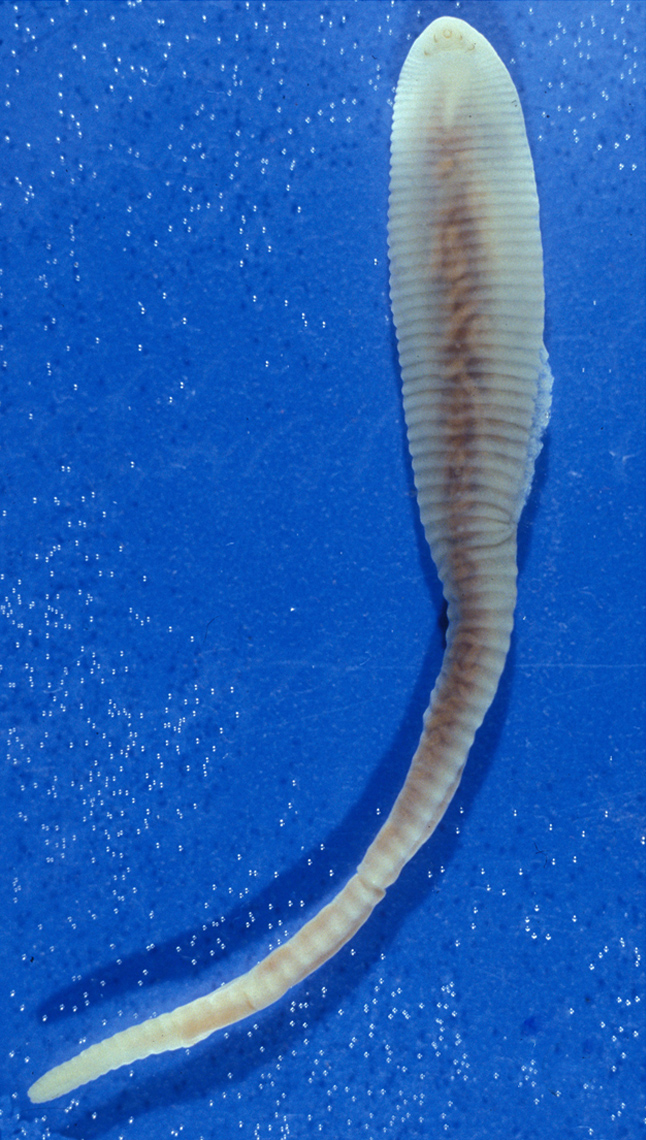
- Adult female Linguatula serrata

Scientific classification
- Kingdom: Animalia
- Phylum: Arthropoda
- Clade: Pancrustacea
- Class: Ichthyostraca
- Subclass: Pentastomida; Diesing, 1836

Orders
- see text

Synonyms
- Pentastomata; Linguatulida

= Pentastomida =

Pentastomida Temporal range: Wuliuan–Recent

Subclass of crustaceans

The Pentastomida are an enigmatic group of parasitic arthropods commonly known as tongue worms due to the resemblance of the species of the genus Linguatula to a vertebrate tongue; despite some members having a somewhat flatworm like appearance, molecular studies point to this group being highly derived crustaceans.

About 130 species of pentastomids are known; all are obligate parasites with correspondingly degenerate anatomy. Adult tongue worms vary from about 1 to 14 cm (0.4 to 5.5 in) in length and parasitize the respiratory tracts of vertebrates. They have five anterior appendages. One is the mouth; the others are two pairs of hooks, which they use to attach to the host. This arrangement led to their scientific name, meaning "five openings", but although the appendages are similar in some species, only one is a mouth.

== Taxonomy ==
Historically significant accounts of tongue worm biology and systematics include early work by Josef Aloys Frölich, Alexander von Humboldt, Karl Asmund Rudolphi, Karl Moriz Diesing and Rudolph Leuckart.

Other important summaries have been published by Louis Westenra Sambon, Richard Heymons and John Riley, and a review of their evolutionary relationships with a bibliography up to 1969 was published by J. T. Self.

=== Affinities ===
The affinities of tongue worms have long proved controversial. Historically, they were initially compared to various groups of parasitic worms. Once the arthropod-like nature of their cuticle was recognized, similarities were drawn with mites, particularly gall mites (Eriophyidae). Although gall mites are much smaller than tongue worms, they also have a long, segmented body and only two pairs of legs. Later work drew comparisons with millipedes and centipedes (Myriapoda), with velvet worms (Onychophora) and water bears (Tardigrada). Some authors interpreted tongue worms as essentially intermediate between annelids and arthropods, while others suggested that they deserved a phylum of their own. Tongue worms grow by moulting, which suggests they belong to Ecdysozoa, while other work has identified the arthropod-like nature of their larvae. In general, the two current alternative interpretations are: pentastomids are highly modified and parasitic crustaceans, probably related to fish lice, or they are an ancient group of stem-arthropods, close to the origins of Arthropoda.

=== Crustaceans ===
The discovery that tongue worms are crustaceans can be traced back to the work of Pierre-Joseph Van Beneden, who compared them to parasitic copepods. The modern form of this hypothesis dates from Karl Georg Wingstrand's study of sperm morphology, which recognized similarities in sperm structure between tongue worms and fish lice (Argulidae) – a group of maxillopod crustaceans which live as parasites on fish and occasionally amphibians. John Riley and colleagues also offered a detailed justification for the inclusion of the tongue worms among the crustaceans. The fish louse model received significant further support from the molecular work of Lawrence G. Abele and colleagues. A number of subsequent molecular phylogenies have corroborated these results, and the name Ichthyostraca has been proposed for a (Pentastomida + Branchiura) clade. Thus a number of important standard works and databases on crustaceans now include the pentastomids as members of this group.

=== Stem-arthropods ===
Critics of the Ichthyostraca classification have pointed out that even parasitic crustaceans can still be recognized as crustaceans based on their larvae; but that tongue worms and their larvae do not express typical characters for Crustacea or even Euarthropoda. An alternative model notes the extremely ancient Cambrian origins of these animals and interprets tongue worms as stem-group arthropods. A 2008 morphological analysis recovered Pentastomida outside the arthropods, as sister group to a clade including nematodes, priapulids and similar ecdysozoan 'worm' groups. Adding fossils, they suggested an extinct animal called Facivermis could be closely related to tongue worms. However it should be stressed that these authors did not explicitly test pentastomid/crustacean relationships and do not take the molecular information into account.

=== Fossil record ===
Exceptionally preserved, three-dimensional and phosphatised fossils from the Upper Cambrian Orsten of Sweden and the Cambrian/Ordovician boundary of Canada have been identified as pentastomids. Also one from the Wuluian (middle Cambrian) of Greenland. Five fossil genera have been identified from the Cambrian so far: Aengapentastomum, Boeckelericambria, Dietericambria, Haffnericambria and Heymonsicambria. These fossils suggest that pentastomids evolved very early and raise questions about whether these animals were parasites at this time, and if so, on which hosts. Conodonts (primitive fish) have sometimes been mentioned as possible hosts in this context. A fifth genus, Invavita, is from Silurian-aged marine strata of England: fossil specimens of Invavita are found firmly attached to their ostracod hosts of the species Nymphatelina gravida. It possessed a head, a worm-like body, and two pairs of limbs.

=== Classification ===
There are four extant orders recognized in the subclass Pentastomida:

- Cephalobaenida
- Porocephalida
- Raillietiellida
- Reighardiida

== Description ==
Pentastomids are worm-like animals ranging from 1 to 14 centimetres (0.39 to 5.51 in) in length. The female is larger than the male. The anterior end of the body bears five protuberances, four of which are clawed legs, while the fifth bears the mouth. The body is segmented and covered in a chitinous cuticle. The digestive tract is simple and tubular since the animal feeds entirely on blood, except from genus Linguatula which lives in the nasal cavity of carnivorous mammals where they feed mainly on mucus and dead cells, although the mouth is somewhat modified as a muscular pump.

The nervous system is similar to that of other arthropods, including a ventral nerve cord with ganglia in each segment. Although the body contains a haemocoel, no circulatory, respiratory, or excretory organs are present.

== Behaviour and ecology ==
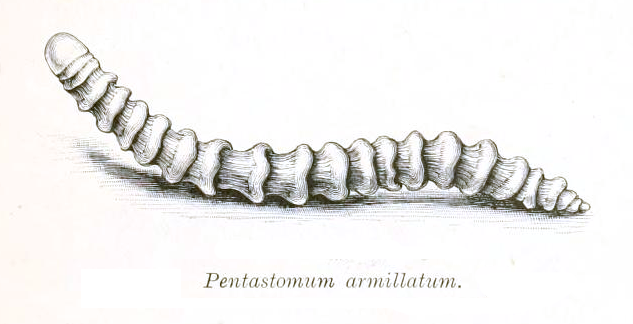
Armillifer armillatus from a python

Pentastomids live in the upper respiratory tract of reptiles, birds, and mammals, where they lay eggs. They are gonochoric (having two sexes), and employ internal fertilisation. The eggs are either coughed out by the host or leave the host body through the digestive system. The eggs are then ingested by an intermediate host, which is commonly either a fish or a small herbivorous mammal.

The larva hatches in the intermediate host and breaks through the wall of the intestine. It then forms a cyst in the intermediate host's body. The larva is initially rounded in form, with four or six short legs, but moults several times to achieve the adult form. At least one species, Subtriquetra subtriquetra, has a free-living larva. There is both indirect development with nymphal stages and direct development. The pentastomid reaches the main host when the intermediate host is eaten by the main host, and crawls into the respiratory tract from the oesophagus.

== Human infestation ==
Extraction of an Armillifer grandis nymph from a human eye

Tongue worms occasionally parasitise humans. While a report exists of Sebekia inducing dermatitis, the two genera responsible for most internal human infestation are Linguatula and Armillifer. Visceral pentastomiasis can be caused by Linguatula serrata, Armillifer armillatus, Armillifer moniliformis, Armillifer grandis, and Porocephalus crotali.

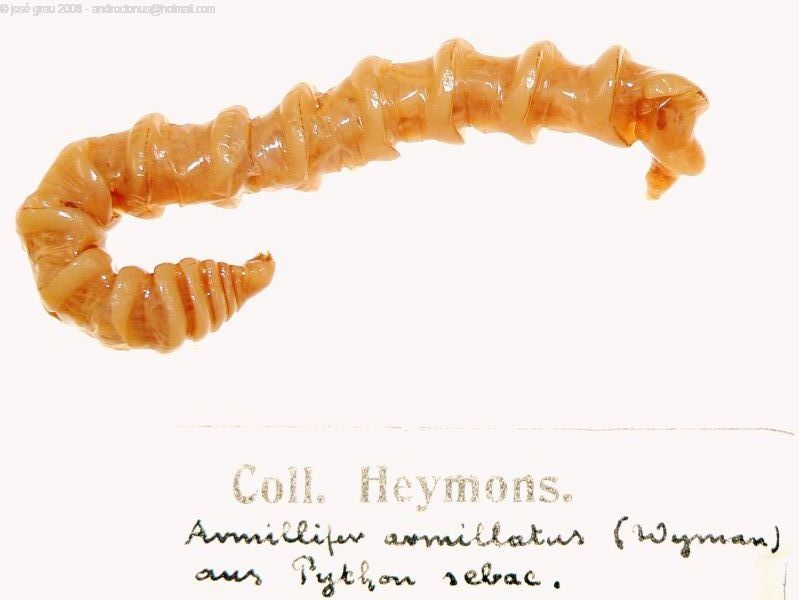
Armillifer armillatus Wyman, 1848, a 4 cm individual collected from the respiratory system of a python, Python sebae. Specimen deposited in the Natural History Museum of Berlin.

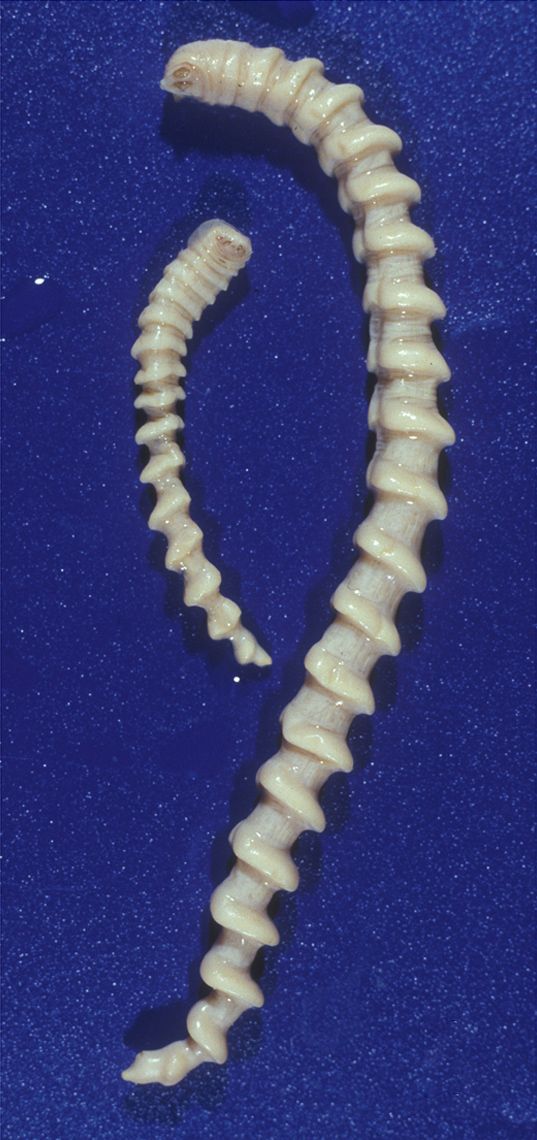
Female (right) and male (left) Armillifer sp.

The terms associated with infections can vary:

- Linguatula disease can be called linguatuliasis or linguatulosis.
- Porocephalus disease can be called porocephaliasis or porocephalosis.
- Armillifer disease can also be called porocephalosis. (An alternate name for Armillifer moniliformis is Porocephalus moniliformis.)
- "Pentastomiasis" can refer to any infection of Pentastomida.

Porocephalus and Armillifer (which are all cylindrical and all inhabit snakes) have much more in common with each other than they do with Linguatula (which is flat and inhabits dogs and wolves).
