= Karl Moriz Diesing =

Austrian scientist

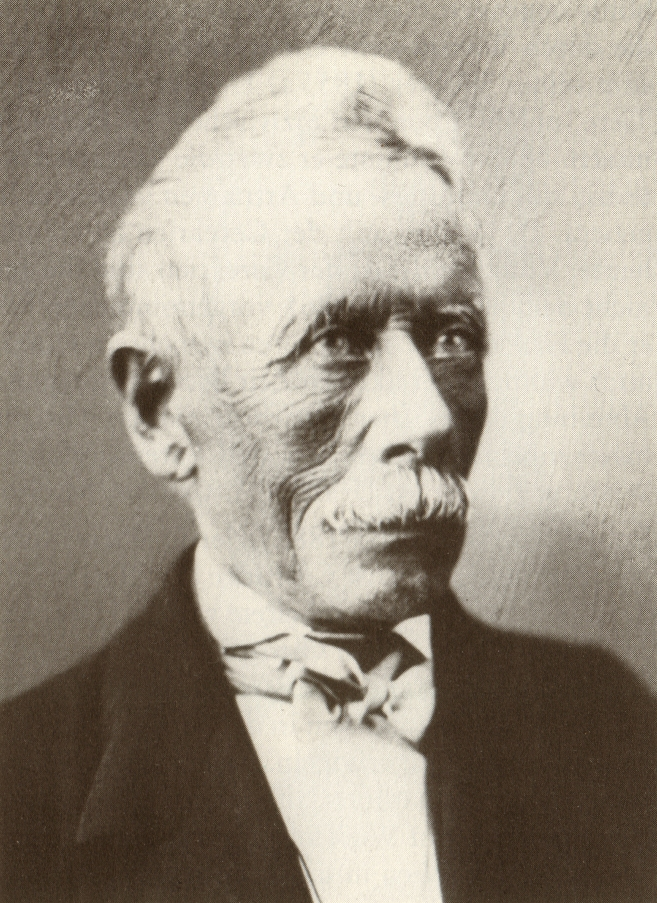
Karl Moriz Diesing

Karl Moriz Diesing (also written as Carl Moritz Diesing; 16 June 1800 – 10 January 1867) was an Austrian naturalist and zoologist, specializing in the study of helminthology.

== Biography ==
Diesing was born on 16 June 1800 in Kraków. He studied medicine at the University of Vienna, earning his doctorate in 1826. Afterwards, he worked as an intern at the Hof-Naturalien-Cabinet (from 1829). In 1836, he became a curator of the zoological collections.

In the late 1840s, he began to suffer from serious eye problems, and shortly afterwards experienced permanent blindness.

His principal works include Systema Helminthum (2 vols., 1850–1851), and Revision der Nematoden (1861).

In his paper "Versuch einer monographie der Gattung Pentastoma" (Ann. Wien Mus. Naturges. 1836, 1–32), he was the first to establish the distinct nature of the Pentastomida, placing them in a new group which he called Acanthotheca.

The genera Diesingia and Diesingiella are named after him.

He died on 10 January 1867 in Vienna.
