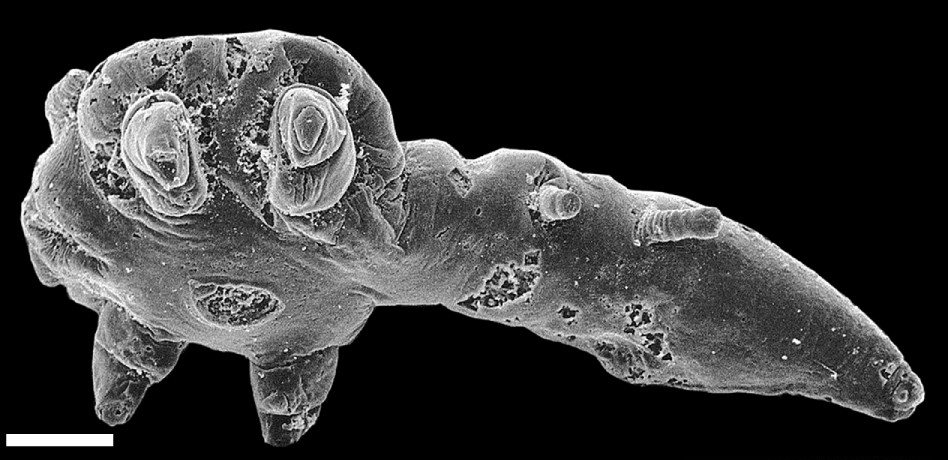
- Fossil specimen

Scientific classification
- Kingdom: Animalia
- Phylum: Arthropoda
- Class: Ichthyostraca
- Subclass: Pentastomida
- Genus: †Boeckelericambria; Walossek and Müller, 1994
- Species: †B. pelturae

Binomial name
- †Boeckelericambria pelturae Walossek and Müller, 1994

= Boeckelericambria =

Boeckelericambria Temporal range: Upper Cambrian

Extinct genus of pentastomid

Boeckelericambria is a Cambrian genus of pentastomid from the Orsten of Sweden, containing one species, Boeckelericambria pelturae.

== Description ==
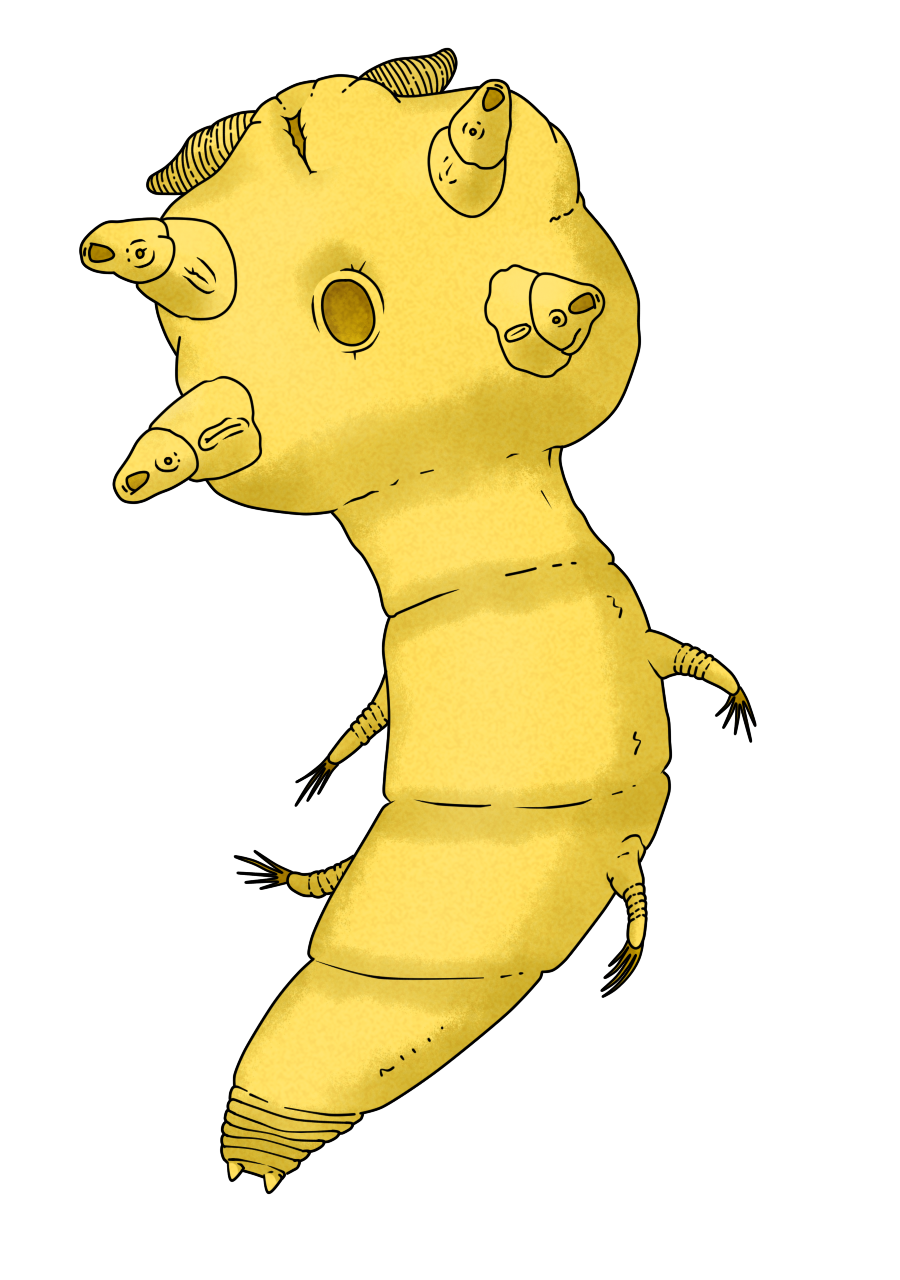
Reconstruction of Boeckelericambria

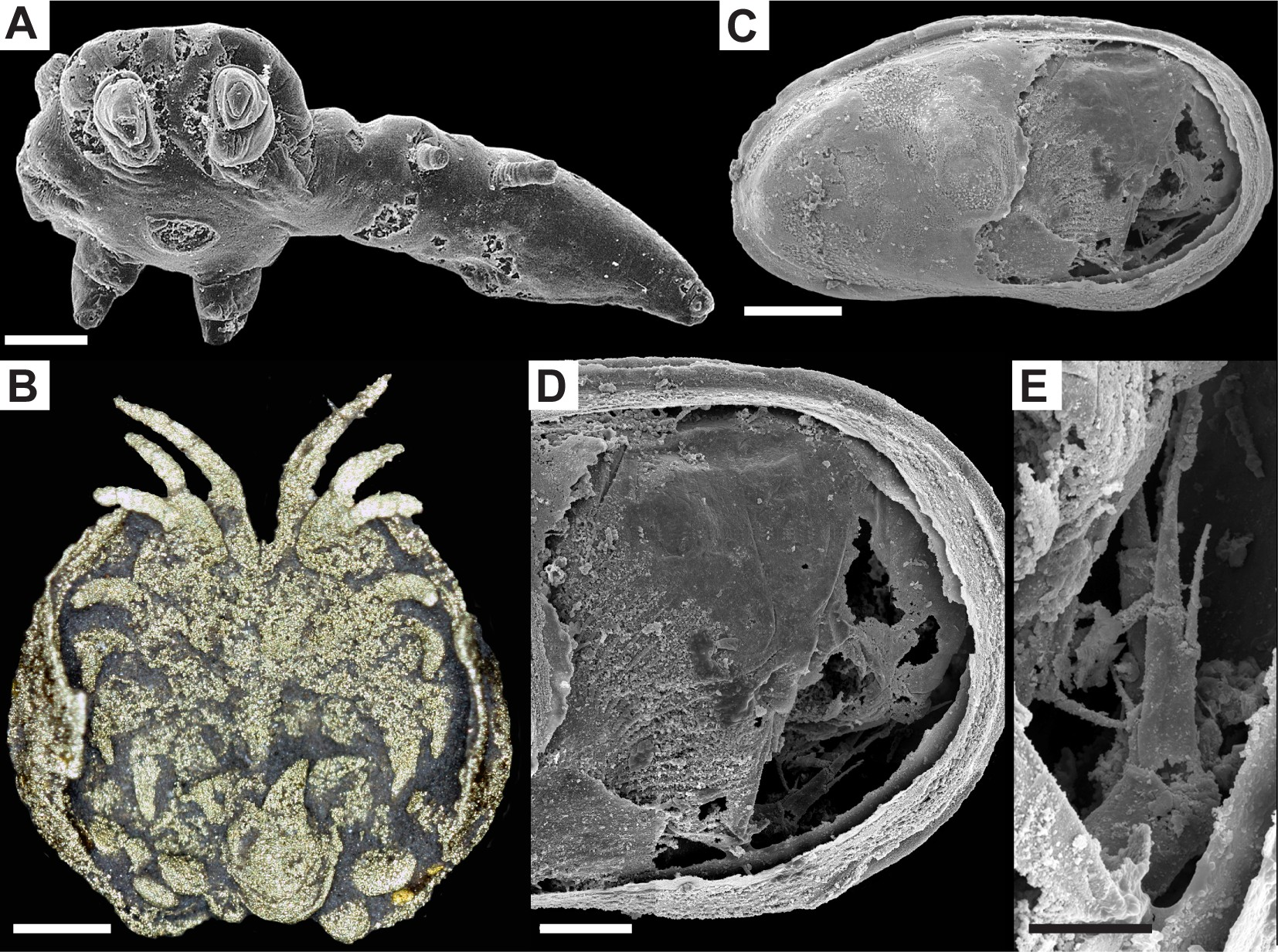
Boecklericambria pelturae (A)

Boeckelericambria is roughly 470 micrometers long. It has a subcircular, slightly flattened head with a bulging mouth encircled by a folded wall. Near the mouth are two soft, fleshy appendages, which seem to not be related to the limbs. Two pairs of appendages extend from the head, with an opening of unknown origin between them. The "fingers" (terminal podomeres) of the first pair of limbs point backwards, meanwhile those of the second pair point inwards. The head blends smoothly into the body, with no apparent trunk segmentation. The trunk limbs are vestigial, being small and rod-shaped with a cluster of setae on the end. The tail is slightly offset, carrying a pair of nodes alongside a slit that may be an anus. This genus, alongside other Orsten pentastomids, is likely a larval form with the adults not being preserved.

== Etymology ==
The name Boeckelericambria honours W. Böckeler, alongside referring to the Cambrian age of the fossil. The species name pelturae refers to Peltura, the index trilobite of Zone 5 (where the fossil was found)
