= Bushmeat =

Meat hunted in tropical forests

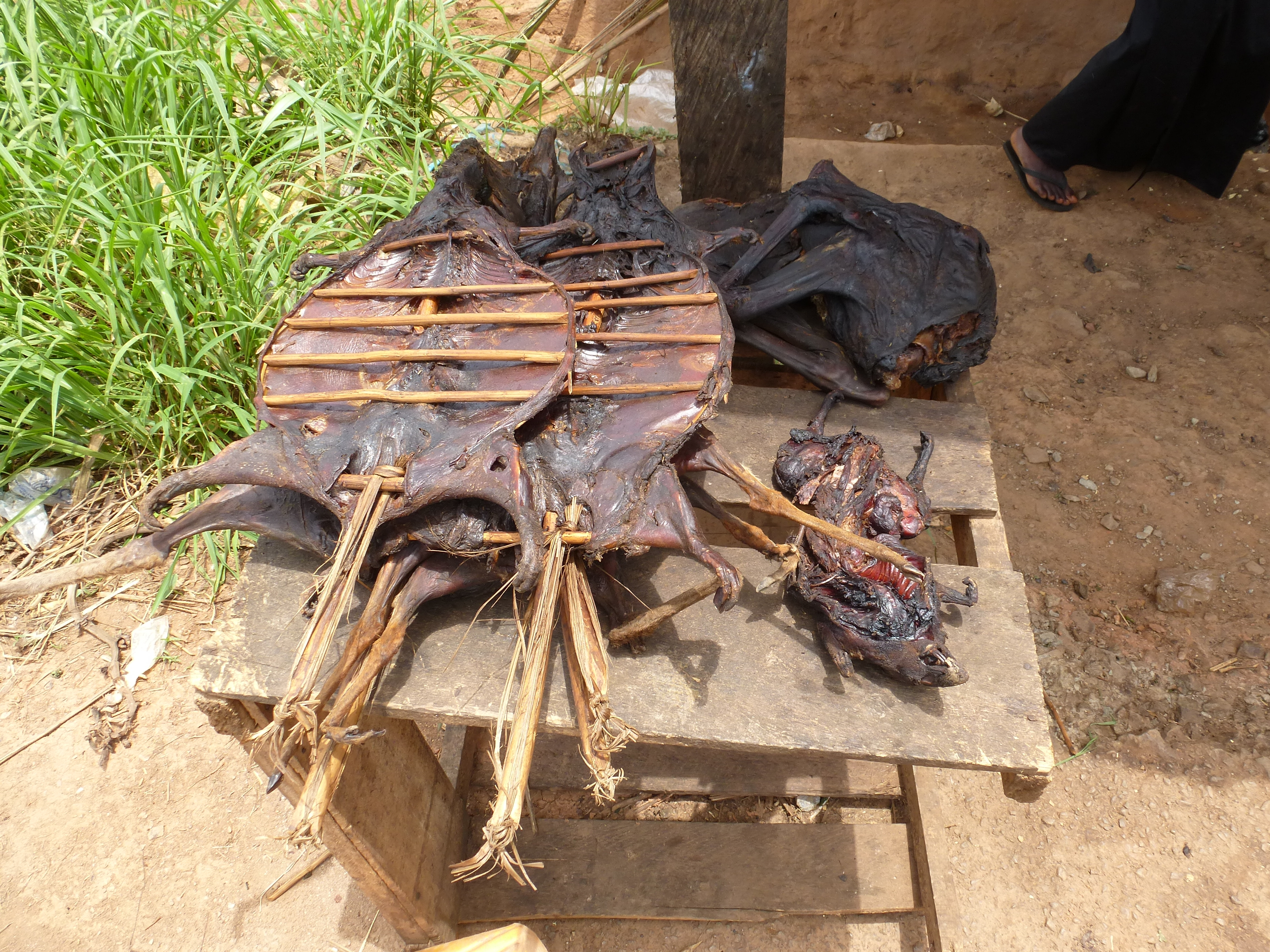
- Bushmeat seen on the roadside in Ghana: includes dried cane rat, giant pouched rat, and red-flanked duiker.
- Alternative names: Wild meat, wild game
- Main ingredients: Wildlife

Bushmeat is meat from wildlife hunted for human consumption, particularly in Africa. Bushmeat often consists of local mammals in an area, but can also refer to small birds and reptiles. As of 2016, 301 terrestrial mammals were threatened with extinction due to hunting for bushmeat including non-human primates, even-toed ungulates, bats, diprotodont marsupials, rodents and carnivores occurring in developing countries. Bushmeat is also a significant public health concern due to its association with zoonotic disease transmission.

Bushmeat represents a primary source of animal protein and a source of income in poor and rural communities of humid tropical forest regions of the world. Typically, bushmeat trade cooccurs with other environmental exploitation issues, such as logging, or land degradation.

Experts often study bushmeat use as a symptom of larger sustainable development issues, in frameworks like One Health that combine the environmental impact of bushmeat with the health impacts on communities. In a public health context, bushmeat is of concern due to its association with the transmission of zoonotic diseases such as Ebola and HIV, as well as other emerging infectious diseases linked to the handling, butchering, and consumption of wild animals. Strategies for reducing the trade in bushmeat include public health education, improving the productivity of small holder farmers to produce alternative proteins, and greater regulation of the wildlife trade and protection of conservation areas.

== Nomenclature ==
The term 'bushmeat' is originally an African term for wildlife species that are hunted for human consumption, and usually refers specifically to the meat of African wildlife. In October 2000, the IUCN World Conservation Congress passed a resolution on the unsustainable commercial trade in wild meat. Affected countries were urged to recognize the increasing ramifications of the bushmeat trade, to strengthen and enforce legislation, and to develop action programmes to mitigate the consequences of the trade. Donor organisations were requested to provide funding for the implementation of such programmes.

Wildlife hunting for food is important for the livelihood security of and supply of dietary protein for poor people. It can be sustainable when carried out by traditional hunter-gatherers in large landscapes for their own consumption. Due to the extent of bushmeat hunting for trade in markets, the survival of those species that are large-bodied and reproduce slowly is threatened. The term bushmeat crisis was coined in 2007 and refers to this dual threat of depleting food resources and wildlife extinctions, both entailed by the bushmeat trade.

== Affected wildlife species ==
Globally, more than 1,000 animal species are estimated to be affected by hunting for bushmeat. Bushmeat hunters use mostly leg-hold snare traps to catch any wildlife, but prefer to kill large species, as these provide a greater amount of meat.

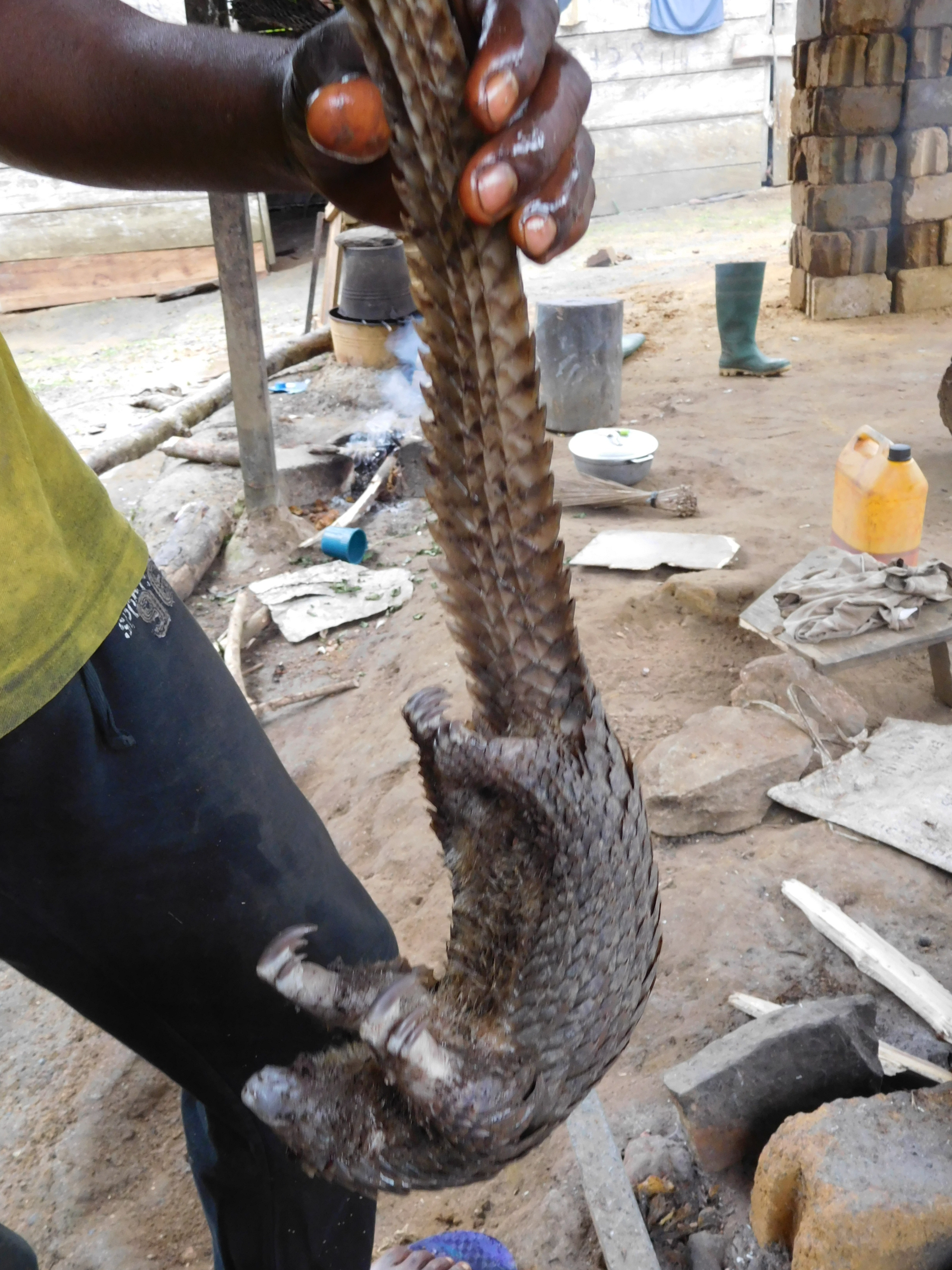
Pangolin in Cameroon

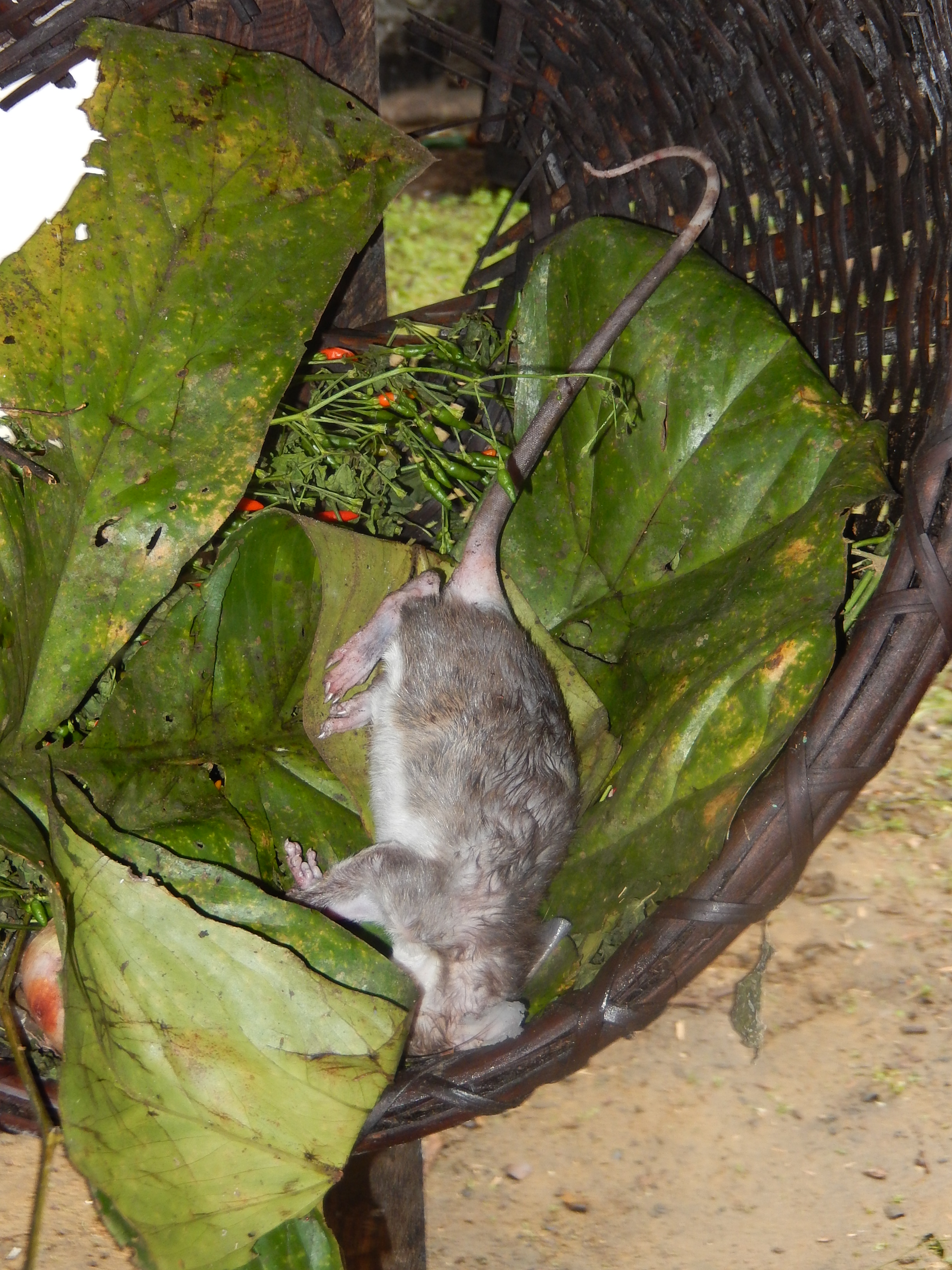
Gambian pouched rat in Cameroon

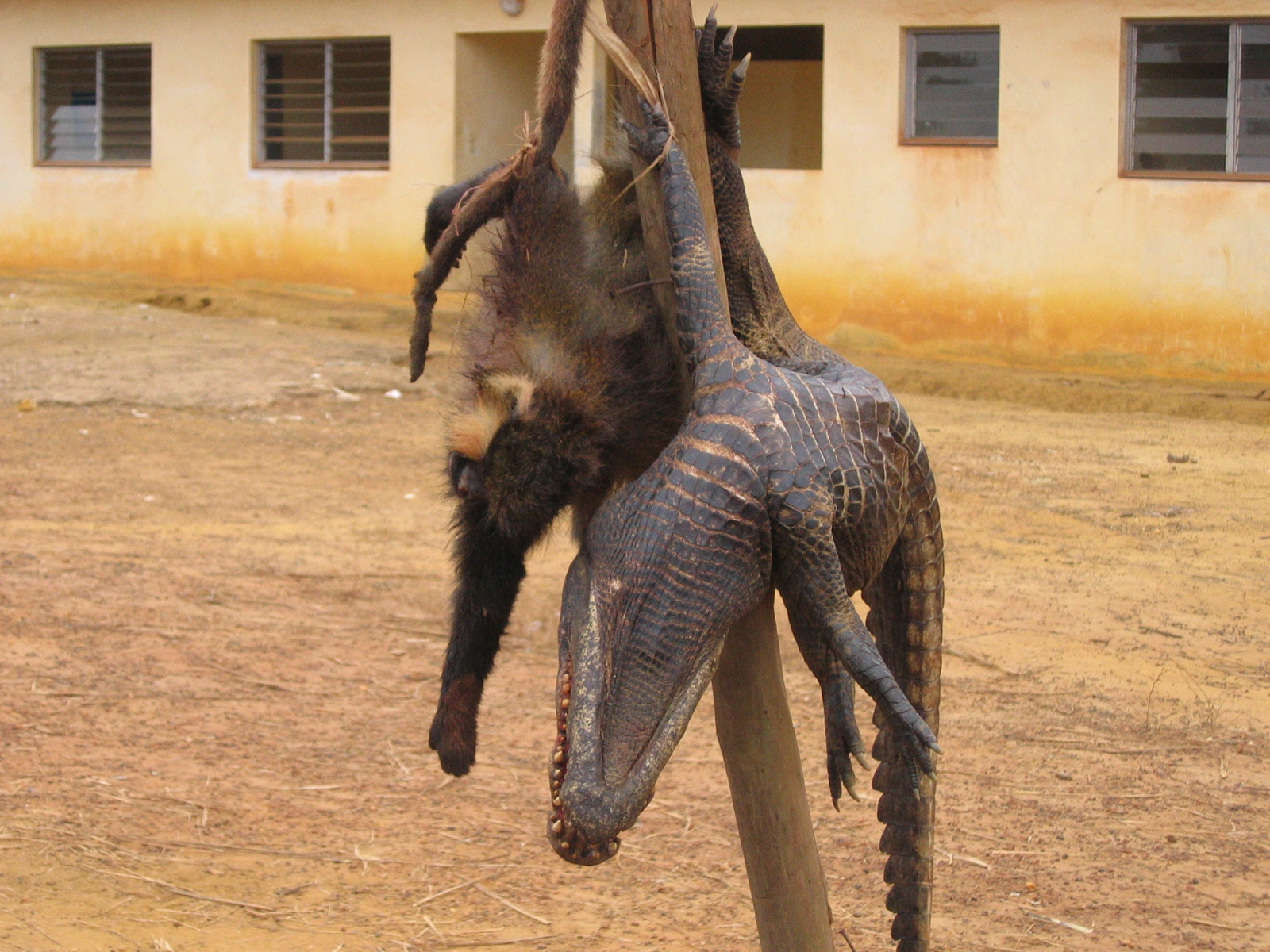
Bushmeat in Gabon

The volume of the bushmeat trade in West and Central Africa was estimated at 1–5 million tonnes (980,000–4,920,000 long tons; 1,100,000–5,500,000 short tons) per year at the turn of the 21st century. In 2002, it was estimated that species weighing more than 10 kg (22 lb) contribute 177.7 ± 358.4 kg/km^{2} (1,015 ± 2,046 lb/sq mi) of meat per year to the bushmeat extracted in the Congo Basin, based on 24 individuals. Species weighing less than 10 kg (22 lb) were estimated to contribute 35.4 ± 72.2 kg/km^{2} (202 ± 412 lb/sq mi), also based on 24 individuals. Bushmeat extraction in the Amazon rainforest was estimated to be much lower, at 3.69 ± 3.9 kg/km^{2} (21.1 ± 22.3 lb/sq mi) in the case of species weighing more than 10 kg and 0.6 ± 0.9 kg/km^{2} (3.4 ± 5.1 lb/sq mi) in the case of species weighing less than 10 kg, based on 3 individuals. Based on these estimates, a total of 2,200,000 t (2,200,000 long tons; 2,400,000 short tons) bushmeat is extracted in the Congo Basin per year.

The 301 mammal species threatened by hunting for bushmeat comprise 126 primates, 65 even-toed ungulates, 27 bats, 26 diprotodont marsupials, 21 rodents, 12 carnivores and all pangolin species.

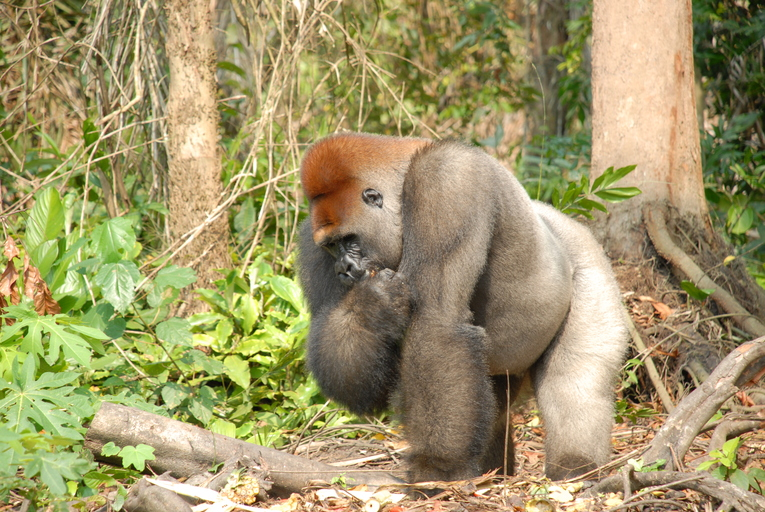
A gorilla in the Democratic Republic of the Congo, 2008

Between 1983 and 2002, the Gabon populations of western gorilla (Gorilla gorilla) and common chimpanzee (Pan troglodytes) were estimated to have declined by 56%. This decline was primarily caused by the commercial hunting, which was facilitated by the extended infrastructure for logging purposes. Marsh mongoose (Atilax paludinosus) and long-nosed mongoose (Herpestes naso) are the most numerous small carnivores offered in rural bushmeat markets in the country.

In the late 1990s, fresh and smoked bonobo (Pan paniscus) carcasses were observed in Basankusu in the Province of Équateur in the Congo Basin. The main species killed by bushmeat hunters in Tanzania's Katavi-Rukwa Region include impala (Aepyceros melampus), common duiker (Sylvicapra grimmia), warthog (Phacocherus africanus), Cape buffalo (Syncerus caffer), harnessed bushbuck, Bushpig (Potamochoerus larvatus) and plains zebra (Equus quagga).

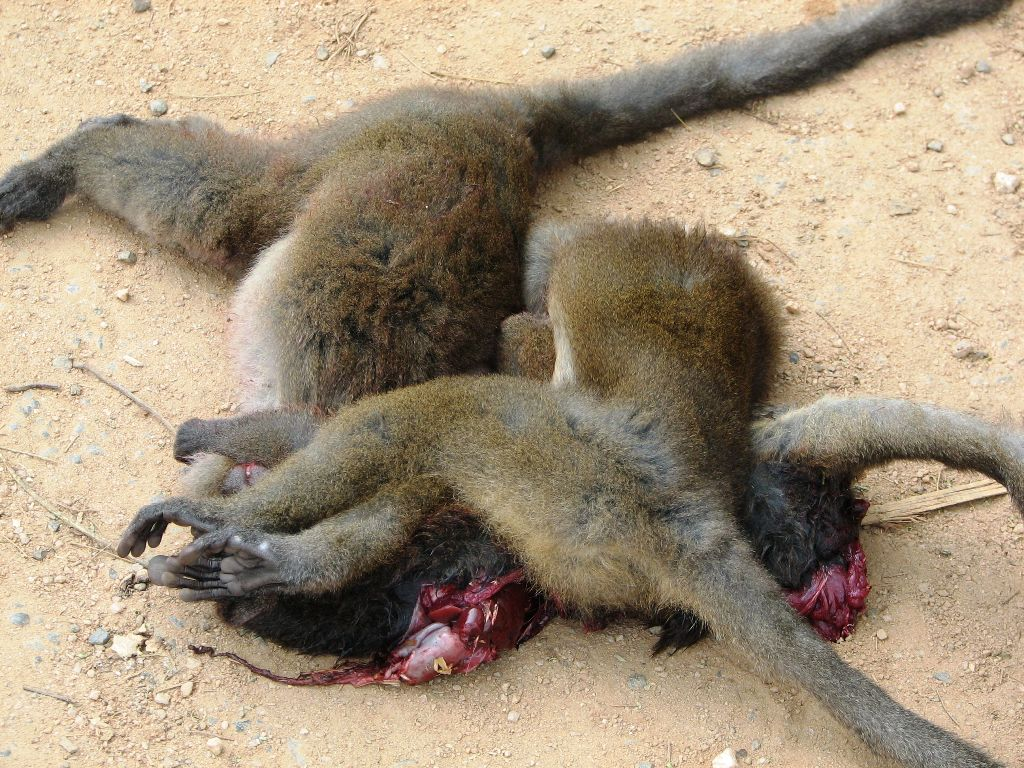
Lemurs killed in Madagascar for bushmeat

A survey in a rural area in southwestern Madagascar revealed that bushmeat hunters target bushpig (Potamochoerus larvatus), ring-tailed lemur (Lemur catta), Verreaux's sifaka (Propithecus verreauxi), Hubbard's sportive lemur (Lepilemur hubbardorum), fat-tailed dwarf lemur (Cheirogaleus medius), common tenrec (Tenrec ecaudatus), grey mouse lemur (Microcebus murinus), reddish-gray mouse lemur (M. griseorufus), Madagascan fruit bat (Eidolon dupreanum) and Madagascan flying fox (Pteropus rufus).

== Dynamics ==
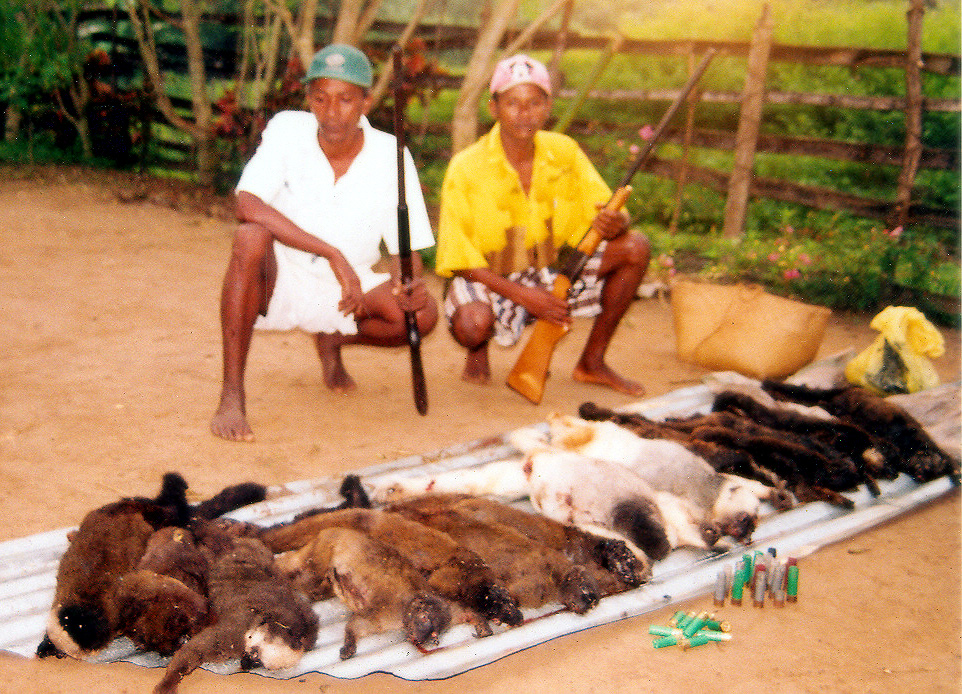
Two Malagasy bushmeat hunters with their quarry

=== Logging ===
Logging concessions operated by companies in African forests have been closely linked to the bushmeat trade. Because they provide roads, trucks and other access to remote forests, they are the primary means for the transportation of hunters and meat between forests and urban centres. Some, including the Congolaise Industrielle du Bois (CIB) in the Republic of Congo, partnered with governments and international conservation organizations to regulate the bushmeat trade within the concessions where they operate. Numerous solutions are needed; because each country has different circumstances, traditions and laws, no one solution will work in every location.

=== Nutrition ===
Bushmeat can be an important source of micronutrients and macronutrients. A study of South Americans in the Tres Fronteras region found that those who consumed bushmeat were at a lower risk of anemia and chronic health conditions, as their diets included more iron, zinc, and vitamin C than those who did not eat bushmeat.

=== Overfishing ===
In Ghana, international illegal over-exploitation of African fishing grounds has increased demand for bushmeat. Both European Union-subsidized fleets and local commercial fleets have depleted fish stocks, leaving local people to supplement their diets with animals hunted from nature reserves. Over 30 years of data link sharp declines in both mammal populations and the biomass of 41 wildlife species with a decreased supply of fish. Consumption of fish and of bushmeat is correlated: the decline of one resource drives up the demand and price for the other.

=== Pastoralism ===
Transhumant pastoralists from the border area between Sudan and the Central African Republic are accompanied by armed merchants who also engage in poaching large herbivores. The decline of giant eland, Cape buffalo, hartebeest and waterbuck in the Chinko area between 2012 and 2017 is attributed to their poaching activities. They use livestock to transport bushmeat to markets.

== Role in spread of diseases ==
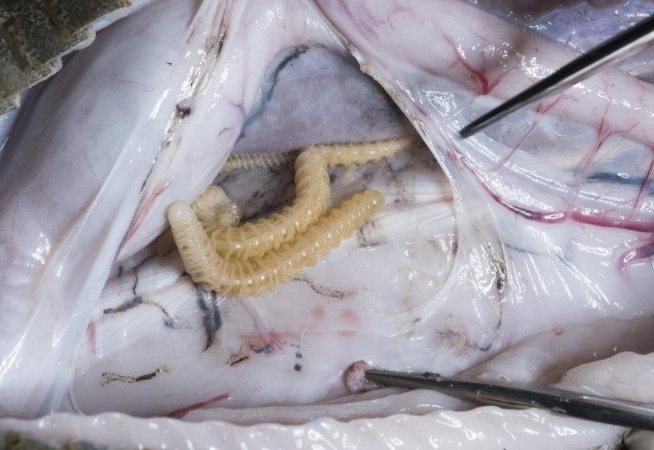
Armillifer grandis as found in a Rhinoceros viper sold for human consumption

Animal sources may have been the cause for infectious diseases such as tuberculosis, leprosy, cholera, smallpox, measles, influenza, and syphilis acquired by early agrarians. The emergence of HIV-1, AIDS, Ebola virus disease, and Creutzfeldt-Jakob disease are attributed to animal sources today. Thomas's rope squirrel (Funisciurus anerythrus) and red-legged sun squirrel (Heliosciurus rufobrachium) were found to carry the monkeypox virus in the Democratic Republic of the Congo in the 1980s.

Outbreaks of the Ebola virus in the Congo Basin and in Gabon in the 1990s have been associated with the butchering and consumption of chimpanzees and bonobos. Bushmeat hunters in Central Africa infected with the human T-lymphotropic virus were closely exposed to wild primates. Anthrax can be transmitted when butchering and eating ungulates. The risk of bloodborne diseases to be transmitted is higher when butchering a carcass than when transporting, cooking and eating it.

Many hunters and traders are not aware of zoonosis and the risks of disease transmissions. An interview survey in rural communities in Nigeria revealed that 55% of the respondents knew of zoonoses, but their education and cultural traditions are important drivers for hunting and eating bushmeat despite the risks involved.

=== HIV ===
Results of research on wild chimpanzees in Cameroon indicate that they are naturally infected with the simian foamy virus and constitute a reservoir of HIV-1, a precursor of the acquired immunodeficiency syndrome (AIDS) in humans. There are several distinct strains of HIV, indicating that this cross-species transfer has occurred several times. Simian immunodeficiency virus present in chimpanzees is reportedly derived from older strains of the virus present in the collared mangabey (Cercocebus torquatus) and the putty-nosed monkey. It is likely that HIV was initially transferred to humans after having come into contact with infected bushmeat.

=== Ebola ===
The natural reservoirs of ebolaviruses are unknown. Possible reservoirs include non-human primates, megabats, rodents, shrews, carnivores, and ungulates. Between October 2001 and December 2003, five Ebola virus outbreaks occurred in the border area between Gabon and Republic of Congo. Autopsies of wildlife carcasses showed that chimpanzees, gorillas and bay duikers were infected with the virus. The Ebola virus has been linked to bushmeat, with some researchers hypothesizing that megabats are a primary host of at least some variants of Ebola virus. Between the first recorded outbreak in 1976 and the largest in 2014, the virus has transferred from animals to humans only 30 times, despite large numbers of bats being killed and sold each year. Bats drop partially eaten fruits and pulp, then terrestrial mammals such as gorillas and duikers feed on these fruits. This chain of events forms a possible indirect means of transmission from the natural host to animal populations. The suspected index case for the Ebola virus epidemic in West Africa in 2014 was a two-year-old boy in Meliandou in south-eastern Guinea, who played in a hollow tree harbouring a colony of Angolan free-tailed bats (Mops condylurus).

Results of a study conducted during the Ebola crisis in Liberia showed that socio-economic conditions affected bushmeat consumption. During the crisis, there was a decrease in bushmeat consumption and daily meal frequency. In addition, preferences for bushmeat species stayed the same.

=== Parasites ===
In Cameroon, 15 primate species were examined for gastrointestinal parasites. Bushmeat primates were infected with Trichuris, Entamoeba, Ascaris, Capillaria, pinworms, Bertiella and Endolimax nana. A large proportion of Bitis vipers sold at rural bushmeat markets in the Democratic Republic of the Congo are infected by Armillifer grandis, which represent a threat to public health.

== Management ==
Suggestions for reducing or halting bushmeat harvest and trade include:

- increase access of consumers to affordable and reliable alternative sources of animal protein such as chicken, small livestock and farmed fish raised at family level;
- devolve rights and authority over wildlife to local communities;
- strengthen the management of protected areas and enforce wildlife conservation laws.

As an alternative to bushmeat, captive breeding of species traditionally harvested from the wild is sometimes feasible. Captive breeding efforts must be closely monitored, as there is risk they can be used to launder and legitimize individuals captured from the wild, similar to the laundering of wild green tree pythons in Indonesia for the pet trade.

== Public health and zoonotic disease ==
Bushmeat hunting, handling, and consumption are associated with an increased risk of zoonotic disease transmission. Individuals involved in hunting and butchering wildlife may be exposed to blood and other bodily fluids that can carry infectious pathogens. Several major infectious diseases, including Ebola virus disease and HIV, are believed to have originated from zoonotic transmission linked to wildlife exposure.

Transmission may occur through direct contact with infected animals, contaminated surfaces, or consumption of undercooked meat. Species such as bats, rodents and non-human primates are considered high-risk reservoirs for a variety pathogens.

The emergence of disease is influenced by environmental and socioeconomic factors, including deforestation, habitat fragmentation, and expanding human activity in wildlife habitats. These conditions increase interactions between humans and wildlife, facilitating spillover events.

== One Health perspective ==
The risks associated with bushmeat are increasingly understood within a One Health framework, which recognizes the interconnected health of humans, animals, and the environment. Wildlife exploitation, environmental change, and human behavior collectively contribute to the emergence and spread of zoonotic diseases.

Bushmeat practices are influenced by food security, cultural traditions, and economic necessity, particularly in regions where alternative protein sources are limited. At the same time, these practices pose risks not only to human health but also to biodiversity and ecosystem stability.

Integrated approaches to addressing bushmeat-related risks include improving access to alternative protein sources, strengthening disease surveillance in wildlife populations, and promoting community-based education on safe handling practices.

== Prevention and mitigation ==
Efforts to reduce the risks associated with bushmeat consumption include public health education, regulation of wildlife trade, and promotion of alternative protein sources. Community-based interventions that respect cultural practices while encouraging safer handling and preparation methods have been shown to be more effective than strict prohibitions.

Strengthening surveillance systems for zoonotic diseases in both human and animal populations is also a key strategy. International organizations advocate for coordinated approaches that integrate public health, veterinary, and environmental expertise.

== See also ==
- Cat meat
- Dog meat
- Game – animals hunted for food
- Indigenous cuisine of the Americas
- Malnutrition
- Roadkill cuisine
- Wildlife trafficking and emerging zoonotic diseases
- Yewei – wildlife meat sold at Chinese wet markets
