= Porocephaliasis =

- Specialty: Infectious disease

Porocephaliasis is a condition associated with species in the closely related genera Porocephalus and Armillifer. (The term "pentastomiasis" encompasses all diseases of Pentastomida, which includes porocephaliasis and linguatulosis.)

Porocephaliasis is associated with contact with snakes. (This is in contrast with linguatulosis, which is associated with contact with dogs or wolves.)

It has been reported from Africa, Malaysia and the Middle East. Its occurrence has been rare in Europe and North America where it has been found in immigrants and travelers.

== Transmission and presentation ==
It is prevalent in parts of Africa and Asia where eating snake meat is common. In Africa it has also been associated with groups who use the snake as a totem. Unlike linguatuliasis, humans are only ever an accidental intermediate host for Armillifer, i.e. the larvae establish themselves in the visceral organs causing human visceral pentastomiasis, but adults do not occur in the human respiratory system. After a while the larvae die within the host and sometimes calcify, leaving characteristic crescent-shaped structures seen in X-ray. In extreme cases a heavy parasite burden can have serious medical consequences and can even be fatal.

== Diagnosis ==
Diagnosis is by histopathology.

== Treatment and prevention ==
No treatment is necessary in asymptomatic patients, but there is no antiparasitic pharmacotherapy or medical treatment available for pentastomiasis. Surgery may be needed for infection by many parasites. Infection can be prevented by washing the hands after touching snake secretions or meat and cooking snake meat thoroughly prior to consumption.
