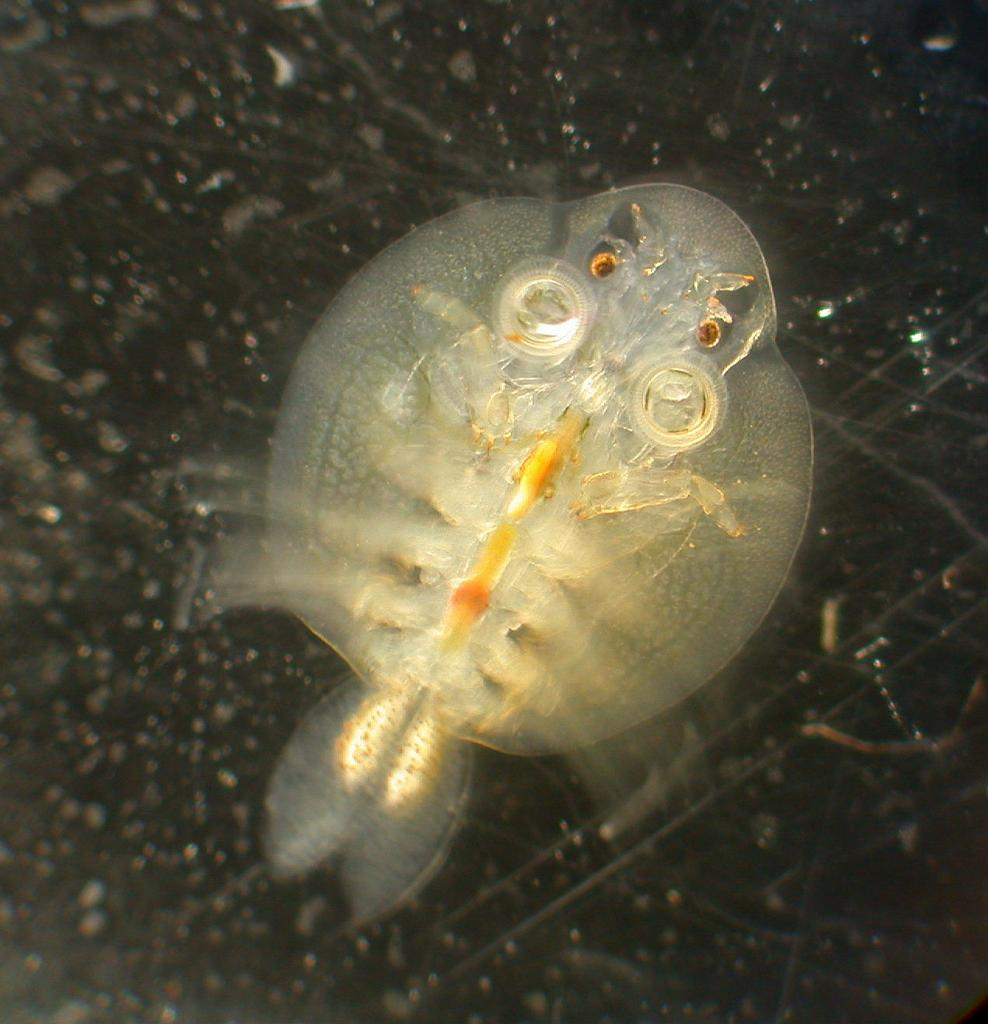
- Argulus coregoni

Scientific classification
- Kingdom: Animalia
- Phylum: Arthropoda
- Clade: Mandibulata
- Clade: Pancrustacea
- Superclass: Oligostraca
- Class: Ichthyostraca

Subclasses
- Branchiura; Pentastomida

= Ichthyostraca =

Ichthyostraca Temporal range: Late Cambrian–Present

Class of parasitic crustaceans

Ichthyostraca is a class of parasitic crustaceans. It is composed of two subclasses; Pentastomida and Branchiura. They mainly parasitize various vertebrates and feed on their blood or mucus.
