= Fogo =

Fogo (Portuguese for fire) may refer to:

- Fogo, Cape Verde, an island
  - Mount Fogo
- Fogo Island, Newfoundland, Canada
  - Town of Fogo
  - Fogo Aerodrome
  - Fogo (electoral district)
- Fogo, Scottish Borders, a village in Berwickshire, Scotland
  - Fogo Priory, a religious house of the above settlement
  - Prior of Fogo
- Fogo Seamounts, Canada
- Gordon Fogo (1896–1952), Canadian lawyer and senator
- William M. Fogo (1841-1903), American politician
- Fogo (film), a 2012 film
- Oyem Airport, Woleu-Ntem Province, Gabon (ICAO code: FOGO)

== See also ==
- Fogo Island (disambiguation)
