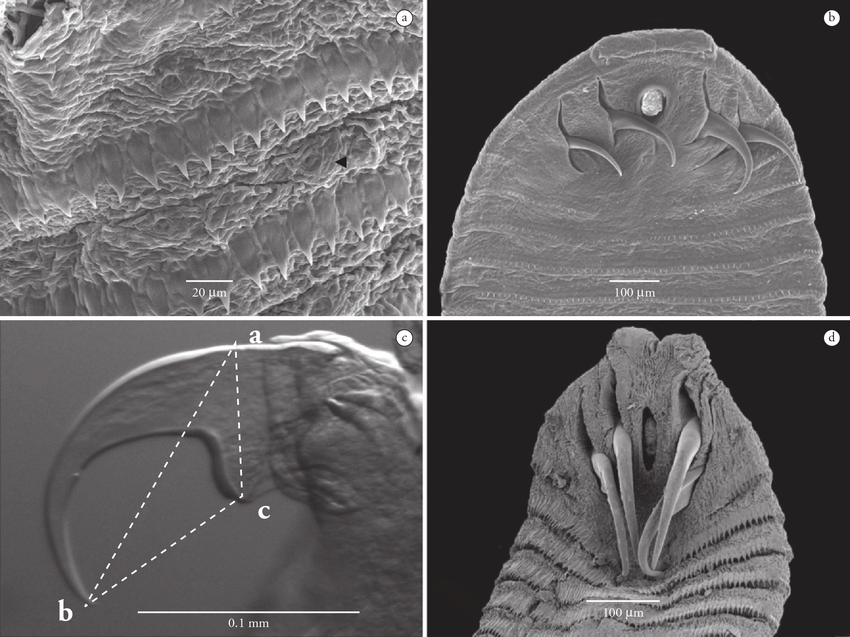
- Various SEM micrographs of Subtriquetra species
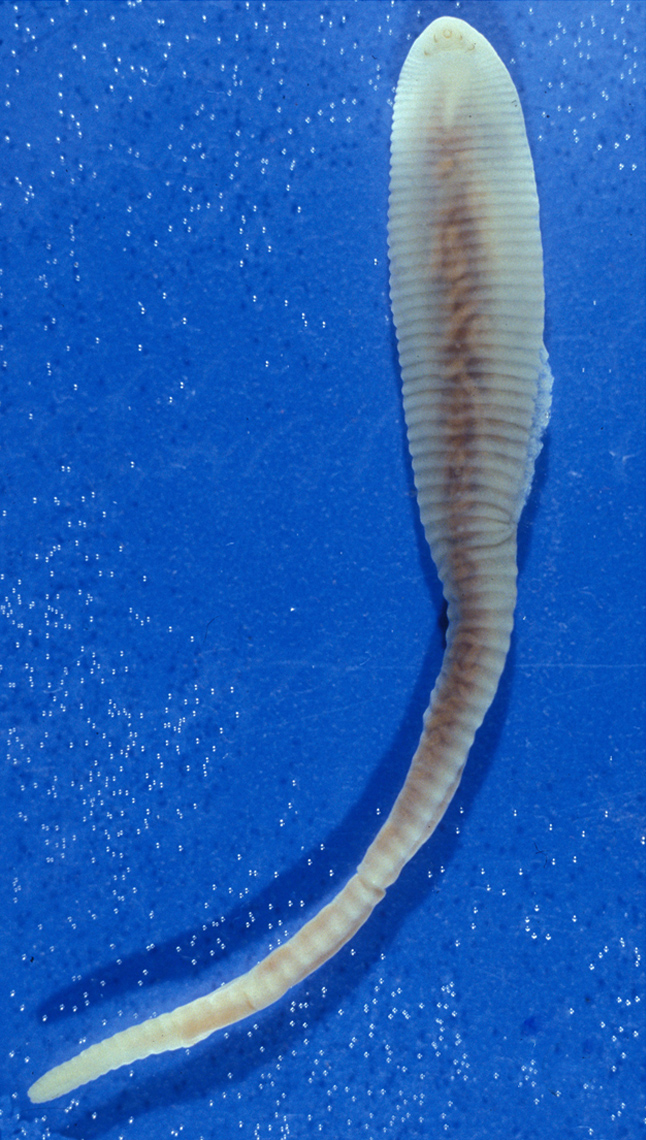
- Adult female Linguatula serrata

Scientific classification
- Kingdom: Animalia
- Phylum: Arthropoda
- Class: Ichthyostraca
- Order: Porocephalida
- Superfamily: Linguatuloidea; Haldeman, 1851

Families
- Linguatulidae Haldeman, 1851; Subtriquetridae Fain, 1961

= Linguatuloidea =

Superfamily of tongue worms

Linguatuloidea is a superfamily of tongue worms in the order Porocephalida. It is the adelphotaxon of Porocephaloidea. At least one species within this superfamily, Subtriquetra subtriquetra, has a free-living larval stage.
