= Birgham =

Village in Scottish Borders, Scotland

Coordinates: 55.645°N 2.334°W

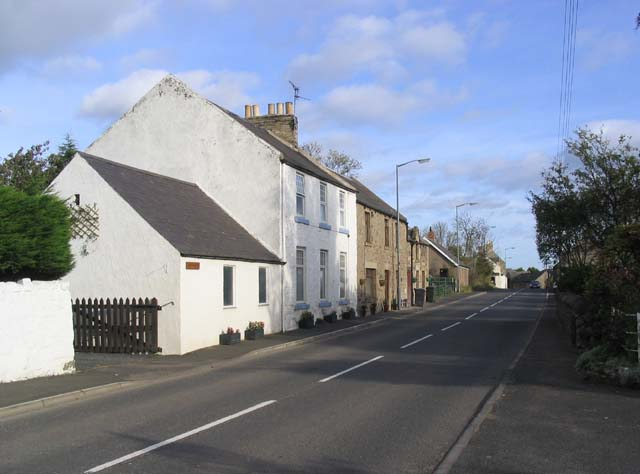

- Location within the Scottish Borders
- OS grid reference: NT7939
- Council area: Scottish Borders
- Lieutenancy area: Berwickshire
- Country: Scotland
- Sovereign state: United Kingdom
- Post town: COLDSTREAM
- Postcode district: TD12
- Dialling code: 01890
- Police: Scotland
- Fire: Scottish
- Ambulance: Scottish
- UK Parliament: Berwickshire, Roxburgh and Selkirk
- Scottish Parliament: Ettrick, Roxburgh and Berwickshire

Birgham is a village in Berwickshire, parish of Eccles in the Scottish Borders area of Scotland, near Coldstream and the River Tweed, on the A698. Birgham is close to Ednam, Kelso, Lempitlaw, Leitholm and Sprouston as well as Carham and Wark on Tweed, Northumberland.

Since mid-December 2015 Birgham has been unofficially twinned with Bedford Falls, the setting for the 1946 film It's a Wonderful Life, even having its road signs amended to include the reference.

== See also ==
- Treaty of Birgham
- List of places in the Scottish Borders
- List of places in Scotland
