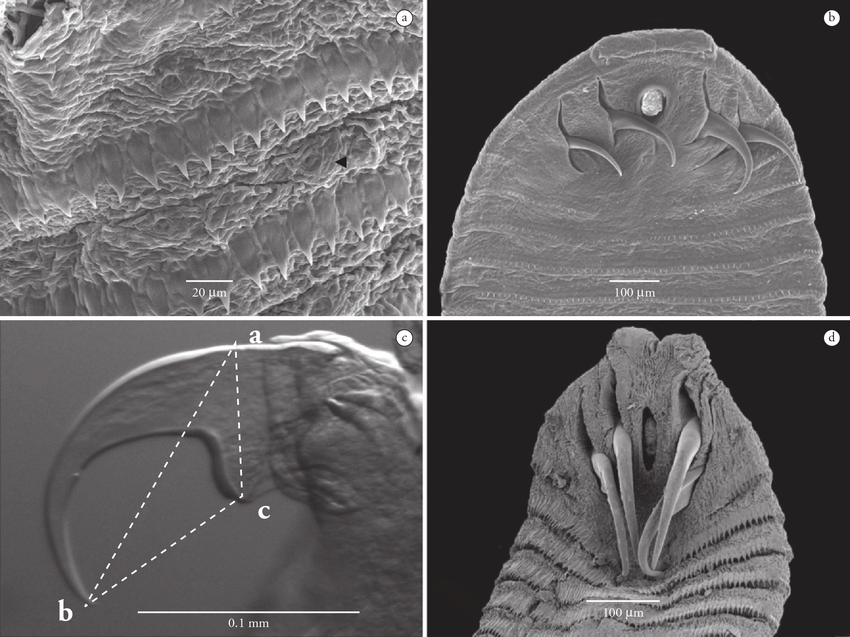
- Various SEM micrographs of Subtriquetra spp.

Scientific classification
- Kingdom: Animalia
- Phylum: Arthropoda
- Class: Ichthyostraca
- Order: Porocephalida
- Family: Subtriquetridae; Fain, 1961
- Genus: Subtriquetra; Sambon, 1922

Type species
- Subtriquetra subtriquetra (Diesing, 1836) (originally Pentastoma subtriquetrum)

Other species
- Subtriquetra megacephalum (Baird, 1853); Subtriquetra rileyi Junker, Boomker & Booyse, 1998; Subtriquetra shipleyi Hett, 1924

= Subtriquetra =

Genus of tongue worms

Subtriquetra is a genus of tongue worms in the monogeneric family Subtriquetridae. The type species, Subtriquetra subtriquetra, has a free-living larval stage.
