= Fogo, Scottish Borders =

Village in Scotland

Coordinates: 55.7349°N 2.3639°W

Fogo
- Location within the Scottish Borders
- Population: 167 (2021 - Fogo parish)
- OS grid reference: NT7649
- Civil parish: Fogo
- Council area: Scottish Borders
- Lieutenancy area: Berwickshire
- Country: Scotland
- Sovereign state: United Kingdom
- Post town: Duns
- Postcode district: TD11
- Dialling code: 01360
- Police: Scotland
- Fire: Scottish
- Ambulance: Scottish
- UK Parliament: Berwickshire, Roxburgh and Selkirk
- Scottish Parliament: Ettrick, Roxburgh and Berwickshire

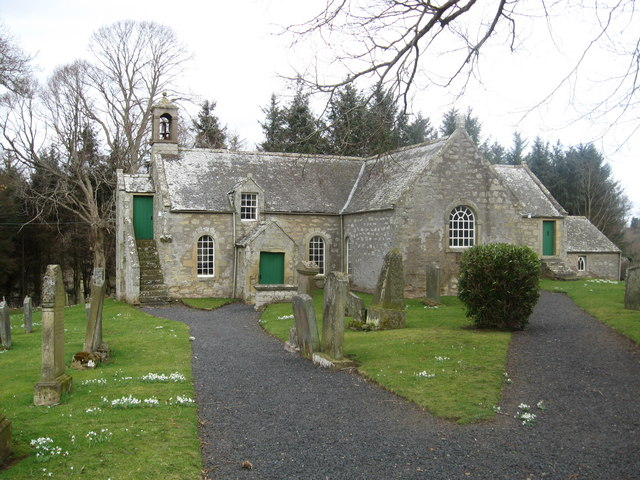
Fogo Kirk

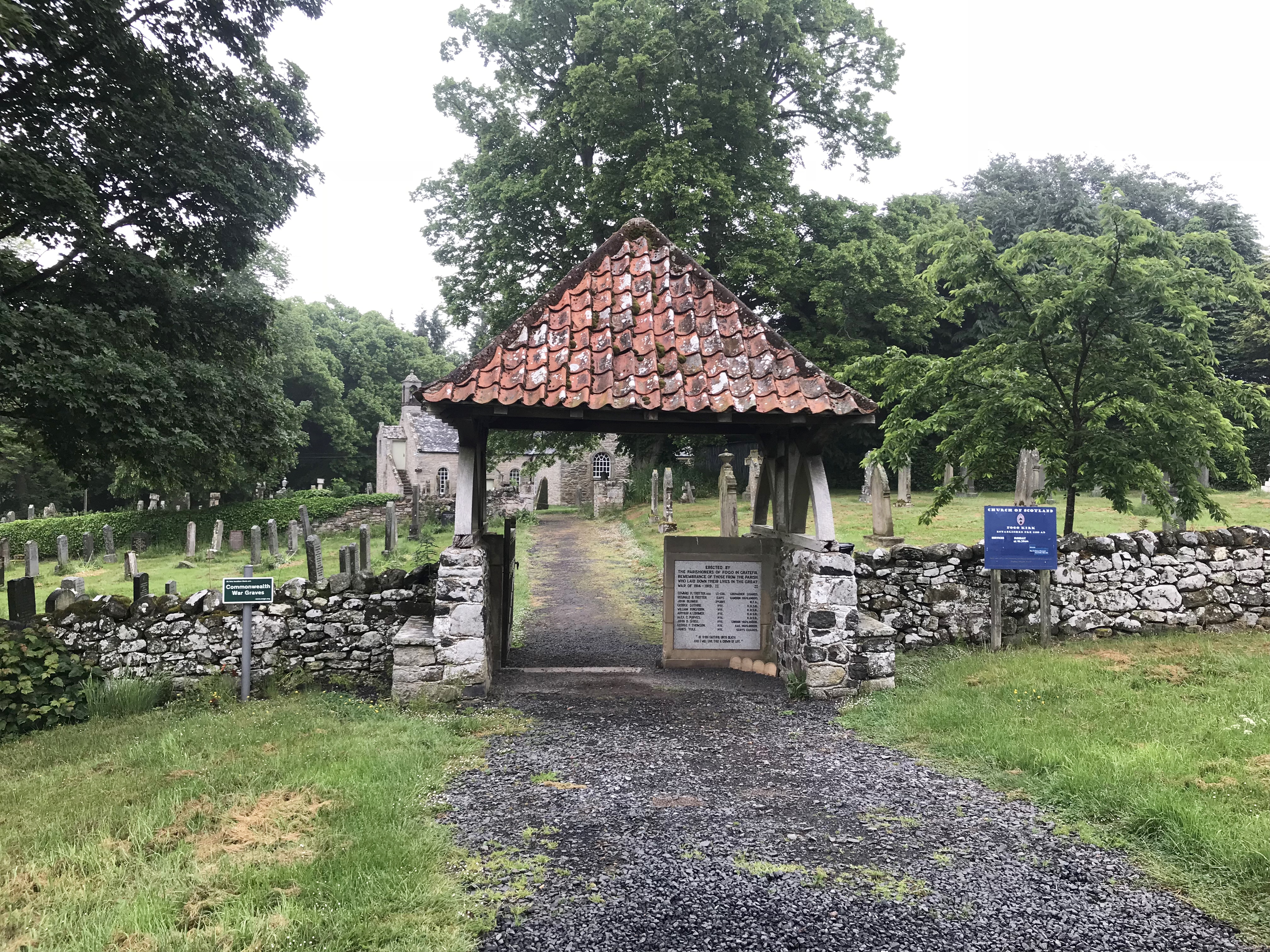
A Lych Gate, the entrance to Fogo Kirk

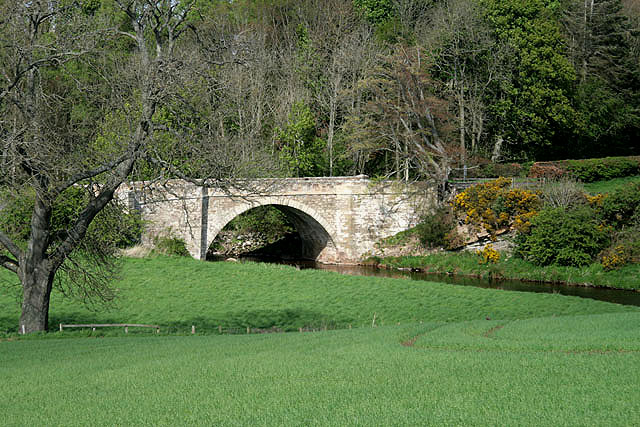
Fogo Bridge

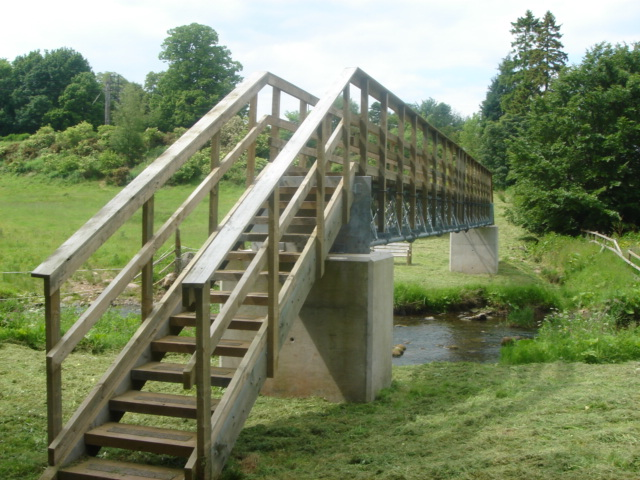
Fogo Foot Bridge

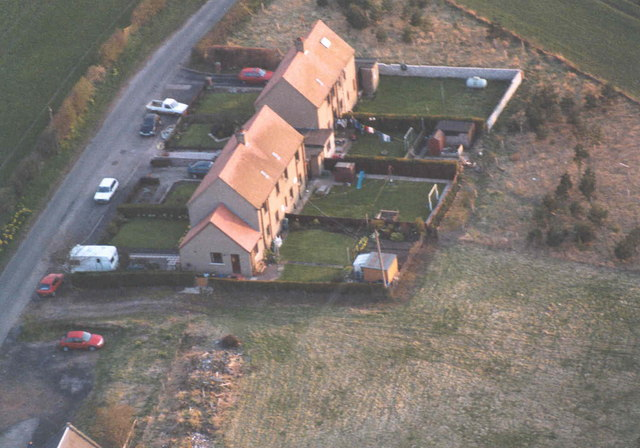
Housing to the west of Fogo, nicknamed Rashie

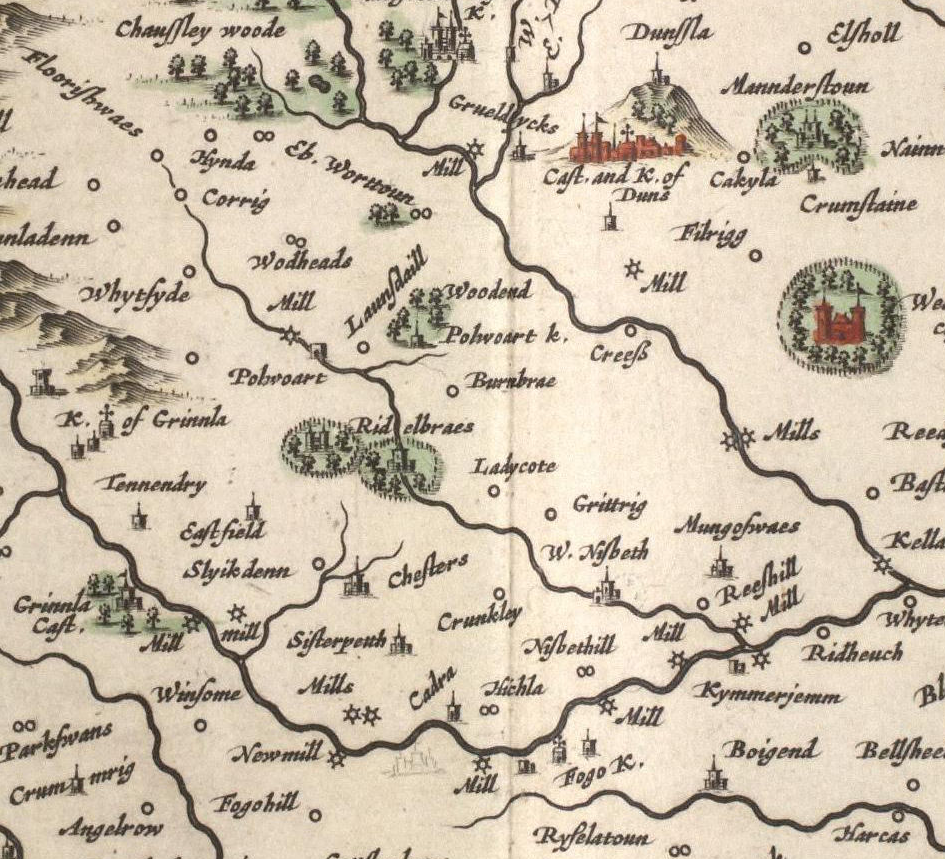
Detail extracted from the original map of the Merse by Joan Blaeu, printed 1654. The Fogo mill is situated at the first water wheel symbol upriver from Fogo K(irk), close to the lower edge of this image >> Click here to refer to map with annotations which indicate various locations, including the modern names of all mills situated on the Blackadder Water and its tributaries.

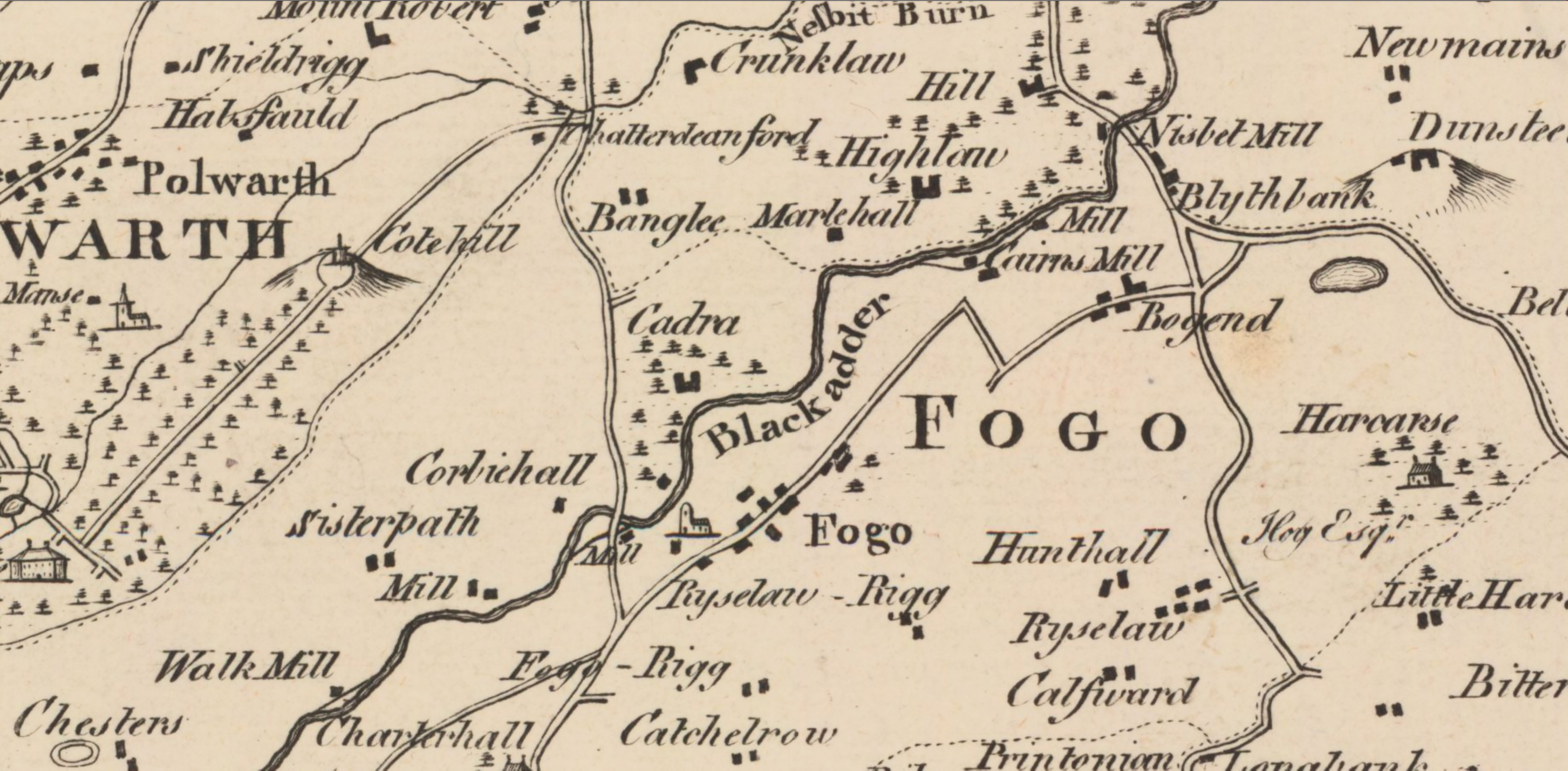
Detail 'Fogo, Fogo Kirk, and Mill' extracted from the original 1771 map of the County of Berwick, SE section, by Andrew Armstrong >> Click here to refer to map with annotations

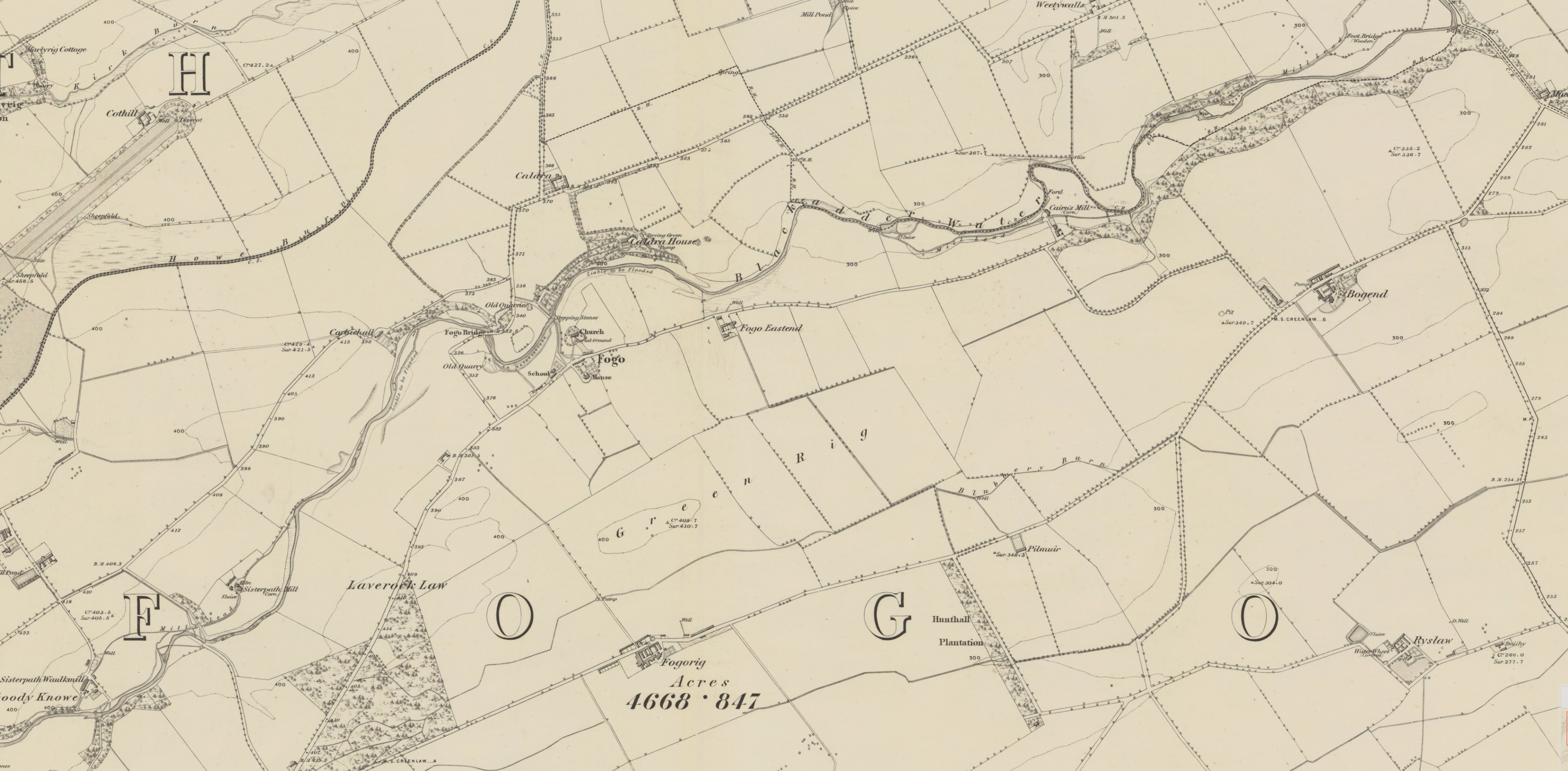
Ordnance Survey map of Berwickshire, Sheet XXII, surveyed 1858, published 1862; focus on Fogo parish

Fogo is a village in the county of Berwickshire, in the Borders of Scotland, 3 miles south of Duns, on the Blackadder Water. The settlement of Fogo lies within the northern boundary of the historical region the Merse, an undulating agrarian landscape that provides rich ploughland and pastures of excellent quality. It has always been the centre of the parish of Fogo, harbouring both the parish kirk and the (now closed) parish school.
Fogo is first mentioned in a c. 1152 deed as Ecclesiam de foghou (Latin for Fogo church), whereby Gospatric III de Hirsel, Earl of Lothian and, later, of Dunbar makes a grant to the Tironensian monks of Kelso Abbey. Due to the importance of its kirk, and due to the fact that it once hosted both a chapel and a priory, Fogo, for a hamlet of its size, is disproportionately often mentioned in medieval texts. A selection of the earliest manuscripts is listed in chapter History.
In the following century, c. 1250, the whole estate of Fogo was valued at 40 merks.
The settlement of Fogo and its upstream mill are depicted on Joan Blaeu's map of the Merse, the first printed map of southeastern Scotland, published in 1654.

== Etymology ==
The name Fogo has until now been derived from the terms "foggage pit, den or hollow" as well as a portmanteau of fog and hollow.
Recent scientific research, published in 2022 in the treatise English Historical Linguistics also points to the Scots word fog, meaning grass left in the field during winter, suggesting a borrowing from early Scandinavian - compare Norwegian fogg long-stalked, weak, scattered grass or heather, typically growing on wet ground. In combination with the suffix hoh / hou, with the meaning heel in the sense of a projecting ridge of land or a promontory, the place name Fogo or foghou, as in the oldest deeds, could now be alternatively interpreted as a site where a ridge is covered with rough grass.

The website The Berwickshire Place-Name Resource has recorded numerous variations of names attributed to the hamlet of Fogo, ranging from CE 1139 to CE 1862; amongst these

- foghou (1139, 1152, 1166, 1203, 1240, 1250, 1280x1297, 1304)
- fogghou / Fogghou (1150, 1188x1200, 1198x1214)
- ffogghou (1153x1165, 1203)
- ffoghoh (1153x1166)
- foggou (1160, 1190)
- ffoggou (1165x1214)
- fogho (1160)
- Aldefoghou (1203)
- ffoghou (1240, 1280x1297, 1304)
- Foggho (1242)
- Fogeho (1243)
- territorio de fogo (c. 1270)
- Fogow (1408)
- Fogo (1516 and later)
- Fogoe (c. 1636)
- Foggo (1752)
- and even Fongu (1275)

== History ==
The early history of the hamlet Fogo is recorded on a number of deeds, all related to the most important institutions in those days: Fogo Kirk and its belongings in the surrounding Fogo parish, and the Fogo chapel, later presumably adjunct to Fogo priory (see Donation of Fogo chapel and mill, 1297). These deeds, documenting donations or dedications by the ruling lord, were handwritten in Latin on parchments that were kept at the site of the ecclesiastical owner, in this case, Kelso Abbey. A book published in 1846 reproduces the text of this collection of 559 manuscripts, the Charta de Calchou (Note: The text was originally written by hand in Latin on parchment manuscripts, most of which derive from Kelso Abbey. In the book Charta de Calchou the handwritten Latin letters are set in type, including the original glyphs and ligatures, which must be deciphered to fully restore the Latin text. The place name Fogo / Foghou, together with some of the above stated spelling variants, occurs on 28 different manuscripts and numerous indices of this collection, some containing multiple repetitions.) from Kelso Abbey. These range from CE 1113 to CE 1567, and may be accessed online here (Volumes 1 and 2).

The importance of Fogo is emphasised by the fact that a surprising number of these 559 ecclesiatical manuscripts, namely 28, refer to some aspect of Fogo, be it the church (kirk), the chapel, or some involvement by a dean of Fogo. Apart from the omnipresent kirk and the chapel the texts mention ploughlands, meadows, pastures, a manse or villa, "croft ... with adjoining land", tenements, "tofts and crofts, and the dwellings that are on them", and a mill that explicitly belongs to the Fogo priory.

The historically most enlightening of the manuscripts that mention facts related to Fogo - apart from the Kirk - are enlisted here:

=== Donation, 1152 (Kel. Lib., no. 71) ===
The Fogo church Ecclesia de foghou and some surrounding lands were donated to the monks of Kelso Abbey in c. 1152 (Note: Donation CE 1152: other authors state 1159, but 1152 is considered the most probable date during his rule from 1138 to 1166. The donation must have preceded the year 1155 because Fogo is mentioned by Pope Adrian IV in a title from 1155 (Scotia Pontificia, no. 35), stating Fogo as a property of Kelso Abbey.) by Cospatrick, Earl of Dunbar. This deed comprises various churches including "the church of Greenlaw, the chapel of Lambden, and the church of Fogo along with one carucate (Note: A carucate or carrucate is equal to a "plough of land", i.e. a ploughgate, the common measure of land set apart for the service of the churches. One ploughgate was subdivided into 8 oxgangs. A Scottish ploughgate equaled approximately 100-104 (modern) acres arable. According to Ordnance Survey maps the current parish of Fogo comprises 4668.847 acres, thus, discounting the woodlands mostly along the Blackadder, is roughly equal to some 40 ploughgates. Compare this to the 1250 deed that values the whole of Fogo at 40 merks.) of land", in Latin: cum vna carucata terre . et quandam terram que vocatur.

=== Fogo mentioned by Pope Adrian IV, 1155 (Scotia Pontificia, no. 35) ===
The place name Fogo is explicitly mentioned in a letter dated 17 September 1155 that Pope Adrian IV wrote to Abbot Arnold of Kelso confirming the Abbey's possessions. The enclosed list includes amongst other estates "Kelso, Selkirk, [...] Home, Fogo, Simprim, and the church of Berwick".

=== Donation of lands adjacent to Fogo, 1211 (Kel. Lib., no. 303) ===
This deed describes the boundaries of the donated lands in great detail. The boundaries then set are roughly the same as the current boundaries of Fogo parish more than 800 years later.
In c. 1211 William, son of Earl Patrick of Dunbar, granted to Kelso Abbey "the church of Fogo, with all its pertinents, namely with the toft (mansio) that John, the dean, possessed in his time and with the adjacent croft, and also a certain piece of land adjacent to the same croft, extending southward as far as Grenrigg. From across Grenrigg by an ancient path as far as my meadow, which lies between Grenrigg and Aldefoghou. From that place towards the west, to the stones (cairn / Pyat Knowe, double hillocks; both north of the Blackadder, west of Fogo) set as boundaries between the land of the same monks and the land of the village men. From the stones down to a certain stream (Howe Burn) descending from Blindwell. Another piece of land in the eastern part of the village of Fogo, with its tofts (homesteads), crofts (cottages with their enclosures) and the houses thereupon. I have also given to these monks proceeding through all that land in my territory of Fogo which John the Dean held in his time in the name of the church of Fogo within these boundaries. A certain thorn bush that stands between the land of those same monks, descending along a certain ditch toward the north as far as the Black Eder. Likewise descending to the blakeder toward the east with adjacent meadows, pastures, haughs (low-lying meadows by the side of a river), (Note: Haugh: also hauch, hawch, (h)auche, haughe, haucht, hawcht, hawh-, hawgh. An old Scottish term for a low-lying meadow by the side of a river.) and heuchs (steep hills, precipices, crags or cliffs), (Note: Heuch: also heugh(e), hewch, huch(e), huych, huyche, howche, heuche, heucht, hewche, hewht, hewgh, hewith, hwe. An old Scottish term for a steep hill, precipice, crag or cliff.) as far as Ricardesfflatt. Likewise ascending directly south by a certain spring towards Estbucerterstrothir, then rising to the west along the path towards Westbucerterstrothir. From Westbuceterstrothir westward by a certain stream to the thorn bush. I have given to the same monks four acres of land adjacent to the land of the same monks, lying on the eastern side, on both sides of the road that leads to Berewic, which is called Ricardflat, next to Blackeder (Water)." [...] Finally "he therefore wishes the monks of Kelso to have and possess the church and all its pertinents in perpetuity, that is, with the lands and meadows that belong to it, and with all the liberties of the church, and all the revenues of the village of Foghou that John, the dean, used to have throughout his time." (Note: This is a complete translation of the Kelso manuscript 303, because the two existing translation miss out the most vital facts of the donation, namely the precise description of the borders that define the lands to be donated to Kelso Abbey (emphasized). The Latin text transscribed from a 19th century typeset print of the original Latin manuscript: Uniunensis sancte matris ecclesie filiis ⁊ fidelibus has lettras visuris ultum audituris tam presentibus qua futuris · Williamis filius Comitis Patricij de Dunbar saluto in domino · Universitati ultre notum facio me dedisse · concessisse · ⁊ hac presenti carta mea / profirmasse Deo ⁊ ecclesie sancte Marie de Kelcho ⁊ monachos ibidem deo servientibus ⁊ inperpetuum fruiturum · in liberam · puram · ⁊ perpertua elemosinam · Ecclesiam de foghou · cum omnibus pertinenciis suis · videlcis cum illa mansione quam Johannis Decanus possidebat tempe suo · ⁊ cum crofto adiacente · ⁊ quandam terram eidem crofto protiguam tendentem versus austrum usque ad Grenrigg · ⁊ ex transverso Grenrigg per quandam antiqam semitam usque ad pratum meum qui iacz inter Grenrigg ⁊ Aldefoghou / ⁊ ab illo prato versus occidentem usquem, ad lapides positos per divisa inter terram eorundem monachores / ⁊ terram hominum ville / ⁊ de lapidibus usque ad quendam rivulum descendentem de Blyndewelle Et quandam aliam terram in orientali parte ville de foghou / cum toftis ⁊ croftis / ⁊ domibus suppositis · Dedi eciam eisdem monachis ⁊ processi totam illam terram in territorio meo de foghou quam Johannis Decanus tenuit tempe suo nomine ecclesie de foghou · ⁊ per istas divisas · videluit a quadam spina [thorn/spine/prickle] que sita est inter terram eoresdem monachores descendendo per quandam sicam versus aqualonem usque in blak Eder · ⁊ sicut in descendendo per blakeder versus oriente / cum pratis / pasturis / ⁊ hawhes / ⁊ hogis adiacentibus usque ad Ricardesfflatt · ⁊ sicut ascendendo in directu versus austrum per quendam fontem usque in Estbucerterstrothir ascendendo versus ocidentem per quandam sicam usque in Westbucerterstrothir · ⁊ de Westbuceterstrothir versus ocidentem per quendam rivulum usque ad perduccam spinam · Perterrea dedi eisdem monachis quattuor acras terre protiguas terre eoresdem monachores ex orientali parte iacentes ex utramqe parte vie que tendit usque Berewic que vocantu Ricardflat iuxtam blackeder · Quare volo ut dedici monachi de Kelchou herant ⁊ possideant inperpertuum perfatam Ecclesiam cum omnibus pertinenciis suis · viderus · cum terris ⁊ pratis adiacentibus ⁊ cum ordibus libertatibus eiusdem ecclesie / ⁊ omnibus aisiamentis iperius ville de foghou quibus Johannis deanus utebatur toto tempere suo · Hanc autem Ecclesiam / mansiones / terras / prata / pasturas / ⁊ cetera aisiamenta intuitu caritatis dedi eisdem monachis ⁊ processi in liberam / puram / ⁊ perpetuam elemosinam pro salute aique mee ⁊ pro aliabus omnium antecessores ⁊ successores meores · ita libere / quiete / ⁊ plenaris tenenda perpertuo ⁊ possidenda : sicut aliquam aliam elemosinam liberius quiecius / plenius in regno Scocie tenent ⁊ possident ut autem hoc mea donaceto [et] processio futuris tempibus firme permaneant ⁊ stabiles persens sculptum sigilli mei apposicione corroboravi · Hiis Test · Digno P . frere meo · Digno Walter de Lyndesei terc vicecomite de Berewic · Bernardo fraser · Ada de Poolward · Bernarden de Haudenn · Note: sidescripts: fol. 117. and FOGHOU. A complete translation of the above text into English: "To the sons of the holy Mother Church AND to all the faithful who shall see or hear these letters, both present and future · William, son of Earl Patrick of Dunbar, greets you in the Lord · To the entire cosmos I make known that I have given · granted AND with this present charter of mine, I have confirmed before God AND to the church of Saint Mary of Kelchou AND the monks serving God there AND enjoying forever in free · and pure AND enduring almsgiving · the church of foghou · with all its appurtenances · namely with that mansion which Dean John possessed in his time AND With adjacent croft AND a certain piece of land adjacent to the same croft, extending southward as far as Grenrigg AND From across Grenrigg by an ancient path as far as my meadow, which lies between Grenrigg AND Aldefoghou AND from that place towards the west, to the stones set as boundaries between the land of the same monks AND the land of the village men AND from the stones down to a certain stream descending from Blindwell and another piece of land in the eastern part of the village of Fogo, with its tofts (homesteads), crofts (cottages with their enclosures) AND the houses thereupon · I have also given to these monks AND I proceeded through all that land in my territory of Fogo which John the Dean held in his time in the name of the church of Fogo AND within these boundaries · He saw a certain thorn bush that stands between the land of those same monks, descending along a certain ditch toward the north as far as the Black Eder. AND likewise descending to the blakeder toward the east with adjacent meadows, pastures, haughs (riverside meadows), AND heuchs (hillsides), as far as Ricardesfflatt. AND likewise ascending directly south by a certain spring towards Estbucerterstrothir, then rising to the west along the path towards Westbucerterstrothir AND From Westbuceterstrothir westward by a certain stream to the [perduccam] thorn bush · I have given to the same monks four acres of land adjacent to the land of the same monks, lying on the eastern side, on both sides of the road that leads to Berewic, which is called Ricardflat, next to Blackeder · Therefore, I wish that the monks of Kelchou should hold these lands AND may they forever possess the aforesaid Church with all its appurtenances, as seen, with its lands AND of the adjacent meadows AND with all the liberties of the same church AND all the revenues of the village of Foghou as Dean John used to do throughout his time · This Church, however, houses, lands, meadows, pastures AND Other easements I gave to those monks out of charity's regard AND I give freely, with purity AND eternal alms for the salvation of my soul AND for the sake of all predecessors AND My successors · freely and quietly AND to be kept in perpetuity AND To be possessed: as freely, quietly, and fully as any other alms are held in the kingdom of Scotland. AND possessed · so that these my gifts may firmly endure in procession for future times AND I have confirmed this as permanent by affixing the impression of my seal. These [witnesses] testify · Noble P, my brother · Noble Walter of Lindsey, third sheriff of Berwick · Bernardo fraser · Ada of Poolward (Polwarth) · Bernard of Haudenn" ·)

=== Fogo chapel dedicated, 1242 ===
On 2 April 1242 the chapel of Lord William near Foggho, Latin: Capella domini W. fil. co. apud Foggho, son of the Earl, was consecrated by David de Bernham, Bishop of St. Andrews, Scotland.

=== Fogo church dedicated, 1243 ===
On 29 March 1243 the Fogeho church, Latin: Eccl[esia] de Fogeho, was consecrated by David de Bernham, Bishop of St. Andrews, Scotland.

=== Fogo valued at 40 merks, c. 1250 ===
According to a document from c. 1250 the church and hamlet of Fogo, Latin: (ecclesia) De Foghou, were valued at 40 merks, equal to 40× 6 ounces of silver, again corresponding to 26 2/3 Pound Scots. Note that the deed does not indicate whether this amount equals the purchase value of the property or the annual rent due to the proprietor, in this case Kelso Abbey. Historical comparisons with other ecclesiastical estates do indicate that the amount was surely the latter. As such, in those days 240 ounces of silver would comprise a huge value. (Note: A merk was equal to half a pound of silver. This is equivalent to 6 ounces, as the Saxon pound and its successor after the Norman conquest, the tower pound, were subdivided into 12 (tower) ounces. Thus the whole of Fogo, i.e. all the lands and housings of Fogo parish, would have been equivalent to 40 half-pounds = 240 ounces of silver. Note that the deed does not indicate whether this amount is the purchase value of the property or the annual rent due to the proprietor, in this case Kelso Abbey. Whichever applies, in those days 240 ounces of silver would nevertheless comprise a huge value. Sources vary about how much a pound weighed in previous centuries, but according to the site pound (mass) which refers to various sources, the tower pound equalled 350 grams, thus a merk of 6 tower ounces would equal 175 grams and one tower ounce would weigh ca. 29,2 grams. Take heed that this value was not standardised though and differed according to region.) (Note: To assert the value of a property contemporary to the valuation of Fogo at 40 merks this explanation, although from the north of Scotland, may also deem as a provisional benchmark. An old Norse source states "... the measuring of land by rental, the unit being the oimceland,[ ...] the land for which the abbot was paid an ounce of silver as rental. 'Ounceland' rarely is met with; but smaller amounts are quite common. In an ounce silver there were held to be 18 or 20 dwts [dwt = pennyweight, derived from the Roman coin 'denarius'], and 'penny' lands abound". In comparison, three centuries after King David's time a (large) loaf of wheat bread cost 1 penny, i.e. the "penny loaf".)

=== Donation of Fogo chapel and mill, 1297 (Kel. Lib., no. 305) ===
In 1297 yet another grant was issued by Patrick Corbet, Lord of Fogo, to Kelso Abbey, dated 20 August 1297; the subject of which is "the chapel of Fogo with the mill of the same, with [all] the lands [... ] [that were] conveyed to the chapel in the tenement of Fogo. [... ] The monks (of Kelso Abbey) will arrange to acquire three monks or three secular chaplains to celebrate divine service in the said chapel for the souls of his ancestors and successors." Note that the donated edifice is "the chapel of Fogo", as stated in every subsequent re-grant; the later term "priory", which would surely have applied once the designated monks had settled in, does not appear in any of the manuscripts of the Kelso mother house and thus may have indicated a separate building. Currently, apart from Fogo kirk, no further remains are known, neither of the chapel nor of any outbuildings.

=== Rough wooing (1545) ===
In 1545 an English force invaded the Merse, one of a series of incursions known as the Rough Wooing.
On Sunday, 20th of September 1545, coming from Kelso, the commanding Earl of Hertford razed first Coldstream, then marched through the parish of Fogga (Fogo), burning every farmstead, mill, manse, and kirk on the way. Thereupon he camped overnight in the vicinity of Fogo and subsequently proceeded to burn down both town and castle of Duns and to devastate all of Duns parish before returning to England via Ladykirk.
The Earl compiled an account of his campaign together with a list of 'THE NAMES OF THE FORTRESSES, ABBEYS, FRERE-HOUSES, MARKET TOWNES, VILLAGES, TOWRES AND PLACES burnt, razed and, and cast down'.
The following selection of place-names from the list encloses all those belonging to Fogo parish:

Whinkerstanes, Fowge'Rigge, Foge' Banke, Sir James Trennate's house [Charterhall], Ryseley, Fowge [Fogo] Towne, Susterpethe [Sisterpath], Susterpethe mylne, Fowge mylne, the Walke mylne there, the Hill, the New Mylne [upriver of Sisterpath Waulkmill].

A few sites within the parish boundaries, such as Ca(l)dra, Bogend, or the Bogend Mylne (later Cairn's Mill), are not included in this list, maybe not having then been reported to command. But as the first farmstead is just across the river from Fogo and the latter two reside on the road leading from Fogo to Ryslaw, both of which are mentioned, they were surely affected and most likely likewise devastated.

=== Fogo Bridge constructed (1641) ===
The Fogo Bridge was constructed in 1641, with payment provided by James Cockburn of Chouslie and his wife Marion Douglas. Until then crossing the Blackadder Water had been restricted to the ford that was accessible by circumventing the Fogo churchyard to the left, the yonder track tracing from the river bank northwards towards Polwarth. Further details: see Listed buildings in Fogo and the Parish of Fogo.

=== Fogo Church / Kirk repaired (1683 and 1755) ===
The Fogo Church / Kirk was repaired in 1683 and again in 1755. Further details: see Listed buildings in Fogo and the Parish of Fogo.

=== Schoolhouses erected (late 18th century / 1864) ===
The first schoolhouse in Fogo was erected in the late 18th, maybe early 19th century, followed in 1864 by a larger schoolhouse immediately to the west.

=== Cottages at west and east ends of Fogo (pre-1858) ===
A row of cottages at the western end of Fogo, nicknamed "Rashie", is displayed on the original 1858 Ordnance Survey map of Fogo. Also note a row of two or three cottages at the eastern end of Fogo, on the north side of the road to Bogend, opposite to the east wall of the manse.

=== Fogo Primary School closed in 1961 ===
The Fogo Primary School closed in March 1961. Further details: see Listed buildings in Fogo and the Parish of Fogo.

== Listed buildings in Fogo and the Parish of Fogo ==
The village claims two Category A listed buildings;

- Fogo Bridge, a single span, round-arched bridge spanning the Blackadder Water, erected in 1641, rebuilt 1843. A record from 1798 describes the bridge as 'the only one in the parish'. A sandstone plaque on the northern parapet displays the year 1641 and the initials of James Cockburn of Chouslie and his wife Marion Douglas. These are the parents of Sir James Cockburn of Ryslaw, who paid for the bridge's erection, also the bearer of one of the two sculpted coats of arms along with those of his wife, Marie Edmonstone. The Latin inscription below states Latin: Cokbvrnvs Fecit Nomen Et Ipse Dedit Ryslav.
- Fogo Church / Fogo Kirk, Church of Scotland, including inner and outer graveyards, boundary walls and a Lych Gate. (Note: Lych Gate: a covered gateway at the entrance to a traditional churchyard) The first church at this site was founded c.1100, repaired and extended in 1683, then extensively rebuilt in 1755. More exterior and interior repairs and alterations followed in 1817 and in 1854 a loft was added. The current shape of the edifice is that of a T-plan galleried church.

The village encompasses three more listed buildings, all designated Category C.

- Fogo Manse, now Fogo House including stable block, garden walls, boundary walls and gatepiers. The current house was built in 1842 to replace an earlier manse, originally situated nearer to the roadside, which had been built in 1787. Repairs ensued in 1814 and in 1822. As many original details remain intact, this later manse is seen to be one of the most significant buildings in the parish. The manse used to be the residence of the parson of the Fogo Kirk, and is now a private residence.
- Fogo, Studio Cottage including cobbled forecourt. A late 18th- to early 19th-century structure with later alterations, the first schoolhouse in Fogo, "a very small building, thatched, ... containing a schoolroom capable of accommodating about 40 scholars". If intended as a school from beginning on this would make this place one of only a few Scottish pre-1832 Education Act schools. In 1900 the building is referred to as an infants' school, the pupils having moved to the newly erected Fogo Former School.
- Fogo Former School including railings. Since 1864 this had been the parish Primary School for all pupils within the parish of Fogo. The school had accommodation for 123 pupils in two classrooms; in 1881 the average attendance was 57; in 1961, its final year as a school, only 19 pupils attended. It closed in March 1961 and the building is now a nursery. On some evenings the school is used by the Fogo section of the Scottish Women's (Rural) Institutes (SWI).

The surrounding parish of Fogo also hosts a considerable number of listed buildings.

- Refer to this illustrated list of listed buildings in the parish of Fogo.

== Other places of interest ==
- A footpath to the left of the churchyard leads down to an old, now disused ford over the Blackadder Water. The first Ordnance Survey map published in 1862 explicitly indicates "stepping stones" across the river.
  A footbridge that had previously been destroyed in a massive flood was restored in 2004 and named after the late Rev John Hunter.
- Just upriver from Fogo Bridge the remnants of a mill race (Note: Mill race: the Scottish term, also used on Ordnance Survey maps of Scotland, is mill lade.) indicate the previous existence of a water mill. This mill is prominently mentioned in the 1297 grant by Patrick Corbet to Kelso Abbey stating, "the chapel of Fogo with the mill of the same", on Joan Blaeu's 1654 map of the Merse, and on Andrew Armstrong's 1771 Map of the County of Berwick. The mill does not appear on the Ordnance Survey map published in 1862, only the mill race is indicated. Today the exact site of the long demolished mill is unknown and the mill race is completely overgrown.
- A roughly oval area a short distance from the northern bank of the Blackadder is depicted on a 1858 large-scale coloured map of Fogo as plot 76, aligned at almost exactly half the distance between Fogo Kirk and Fogo Bridge, and at that time partially encircled by trees or hedges. It is known that the Tironesian Order was responsible for the establishment of Fogo Priory in 1253. It was thus widely assumed that the new church had been built atop the preexisting chapel, but this may not hold true; they may have coexisted for some time. A remark on the website People of Medieval Scotland that refers to the chapel explicitly states this is not the parish kirk. Discussions are ongoing as to whether this enclosure on the opposite bank of the river could thus be the surmised site of "Aldefoghou" (old Fogo), possibly including the long demolished Fogo chapel, both mentioned in early 12th-century grants.
- A now derelict site once named "Corbiehall" is situated on the road coming from Fogo and leading to Sisterpath, having crossed the Blackaddder Water over the above mentioned Fogo Bridge. It is depicted as a sizeable building on the Ordnance Survey (OS) map published in 1862, but is omitted in modern OS maps. The place-name "Corbie ~ corvie ~ crow" suggests a connection to the Corbet family, of whom Patrick Corbet of Fogo / Foghou granted the Fogo chapel to Kelso abbey in 1297. Their heraldic shield prominently displays a raven. Though lacking of any proof, this edifice may be the "unknown, but yet important building" displayed on the 1654 map of the Merse, see Maps.

== Population ==
The following figures, based on census data except where otherwise stated, show how the population of Fogo parish changed over time:

1755 - 1871

Year	Population
1755	566 - according to Dr Webster's survey of 1755
1797	450 - according to Sir John Sinclair's Statistical Account of Scotland
1801	507
1811	450
1821	469
1831	433
1841	455
1851	604
1861	559
1871	502

1881 - 1971

Year	Population
1881	468
1891	420
1901	445
1911	389
1921	383
1931	369
1941	no census
1951	425
1961	256
1971	204

1981 - 2021

Year	Population
1981	-
1991	-
2001	161
2011	165
2021	167

The noticeable drop in population of the parish of Fogo between 1755 and 1797, as stated by Sir John Sinclair, is due to the fact that several villages were almost completely razed, and thus supplanted by larger farms. He adds that the remains of old houses are to be seen in every part of the parish. Since the last maximum with 425 inhabitants in 1951 there has been a steady decline in the population, down to only 167 in 2021.

== Economy of Fogo parish (1567) ==
Until the reformation in Scotland took hold every farmstead, mill, or manse in a parish was obliged to pay tithes or rentals to the church. The annual contributions were diligently listed in registers kept by the proprietor, in this case Kelso Abbey. The master register of Kelso Abbey is titled RENTALL OF THE ABBACIE, section THE KIRKIS THAT PAIS VITTALL, a part of the manuscript collection "Charta de Calchou". The two pages that apply to the parish of Fogo, pages 504 and 505, declare the amounts of cereals that are annually due by each farmstead as of the year 1567.

FOGO TOWNE, FOGO RIGE and GAYRIG - summa 3 ch[auldrons] 4 bollis
In wheat 4 bollis, in barley 1 ch[auldron], in oats 2 ch[auldrons]

BOGEND (surely including the Bogend Mylne) - summa 2 ch[auldrons]
In wheat 2 bollis, in barley 10 bo[llis], in oats 1 ch[auldron] 4 bo[llis]

CADRAW (Caldra) - summa 3 bo[llis]
In barley 1 bo[ll], in oats 2 bo[llis]

FYSCER PETH (Sisterpath) - summa 1 ch[auldrons] 8 bo[llis]
In barley 8 bo[llis], in oats 1 ch[auldron]

JANE TROTTER IN THE HEILL (Charterhall) - summa 3 bo[llis]
In barley 1 bo[ll], in oats 2 bo[llis]

RYSLAWTOWNE - summa 2 ch[auldrons]
In barley 12 bo[llis], in oats 1 ch[auldron] 4 bo[llis]

RYSLAWRIGE - summa 6 bo[llis]
In oats 6 bo[llis]

HARCARS - summa 5 bo[llis]
In in oats 5 bo[llis]

CHEISTERIS - summa 4 bo[llis]
In barley 1 bo[ll], in oats 3 bo[llis]

QUHINKERSTANIS and CALDSCHELRAW (Whinkerstanes ...) - summa 2 ch[auldrons] 8 bo[llis]
In barley 1 ch[auldron] , in oats 1 ch[auldron] 8 bo[llis]

REIDPETH (only family name stated) - summa 8 bo[llis]
In in oats 8 bo[llis]

Summa frumenti vi bo • 6 bo[llis] •
Summa ordei iiij ch i bo • 4 ch[auldrons] 1 bo[ll] •
Summa ferine viij ch ij bo • 8 ch[auldrons] 2 bo[llis] •
Summa totalis xij ch ix bo • 12 ch[auldrons] 9 bo[llis] •

Legend: According to a trade dictionary of 1863: 1 boll(is) of barley weighed 320 pounds; 1 boll(is) of oats 264 pounds; 1 chauldron = 16 bolls. Values for wheat not stated. (Note: These are Scottish dry volume measures that were slightly different for various types of grain, but often bore the same name. * chalder (chauder) equal to 16 bolls * boll (bowe, or bole) equal to 4 firlots. Weight equivalents of one boll are given in a trade dictionary of 1863 as follows: Barley 320 pounds; Oats 264 pounds; Oatmeal 140 pounds.)

== Maps ==
The following maps refer to the images displayed on the right.

- 1654: The village of Fogo is enclosed on Joan Blaeu's map of the Merse, printed in 1654. Most locations apart from townships, castles, and abbeys are symbolised by a single icon - Fogo is represented by three icons, and, as a fourth, the mill upriver. The icons may be identified as the Kirk (with a cross), the Manse (with a spire), some unknown, but yet important building (maybe Corbiehall, see Other places of interest), and the mill (a millwheel).
- 1771: On Andrew Armstrong's 1771 map of the County of Berwick Fogo is depicted as a cluster of buildings and a church, loosely set to the east of Fogo Bridge. Fogo Mains appears a short distance along the road to Cairn's Mill / Cairns Mill and Bogend. The site of a mill adjacent to Fogo is erroneously placed downriver of Fogo Bridge.
- 1862: The first Ordnance Survey map of Berwickshire was surveyed in 1858 and published in 1862. The buildings and structures within the precincts of Fogo are now rendered in great detail: the kirk with the churchyard, the manse with its exterior buildings and the gardens, the older school building with the Studio Cottage behind, a row of houses to the west, another opposite the manse, Fogo Bridge, stepping stones across the ford, and two quarries.

== Nearby places ==
Other places nearby include the Crosshall Cross, Duns, Eccles, Edrom, Gavinton, the Greenknowe Tower, Greenlaw, Hume Castle, Leitholm, Longformacus, Polwarth, Swinton, and Westruther.

== See also ==
- Fogo Priory, Prior of Fogo
- List of listed buildings in the parish of Fogo
- List of places in the Scottish Borders
- List of places in Scotland

== Notable people ==
- David de Bernham, Bishop of St. Andrews, Scotland, consecrated Fogo chapel in 1242 and Fogo Church in 1243.
- Cospatric / Gospatric III de Hirsel Earl of Lothian, later of Dunbar – by other sources Cospatric II – (b.~1090, d.1166) donated Fogo Church and lands to Kelso Abbey in c. 1152.
- William Cospatric of Dunbar (b.~1187 in Dunbar, Haddington, Scotland, d.1253, son of Patrick I, Earl of Dunbar, grandson of above Cospatric III) regranted Fogo Church and lands to Kelso Abbey in c. 1211.
- Patrick Corbet of Fogo / Foghou (b.<1241, d.?), son of William Cospatric of Dunbar, grandson of above William Cospatric of Dunbar) granted the chapel of Fogo with the mill of the same to Kelso Abbey in 1297. The Corbet's (corbie ~ crow) family's heraldic shield prominently displays a raven.
- Earl of Hertford led a particularly devastating campaign into the Merse region of Scotland in September 1545. This was one of a series of incursions known as the Rough wooing.
- John Hunter, minister of Fogo Kirk from 1926 to 1965. Refer to the John Hunter Footbridge, reerected in 2004.

== Gallery ==
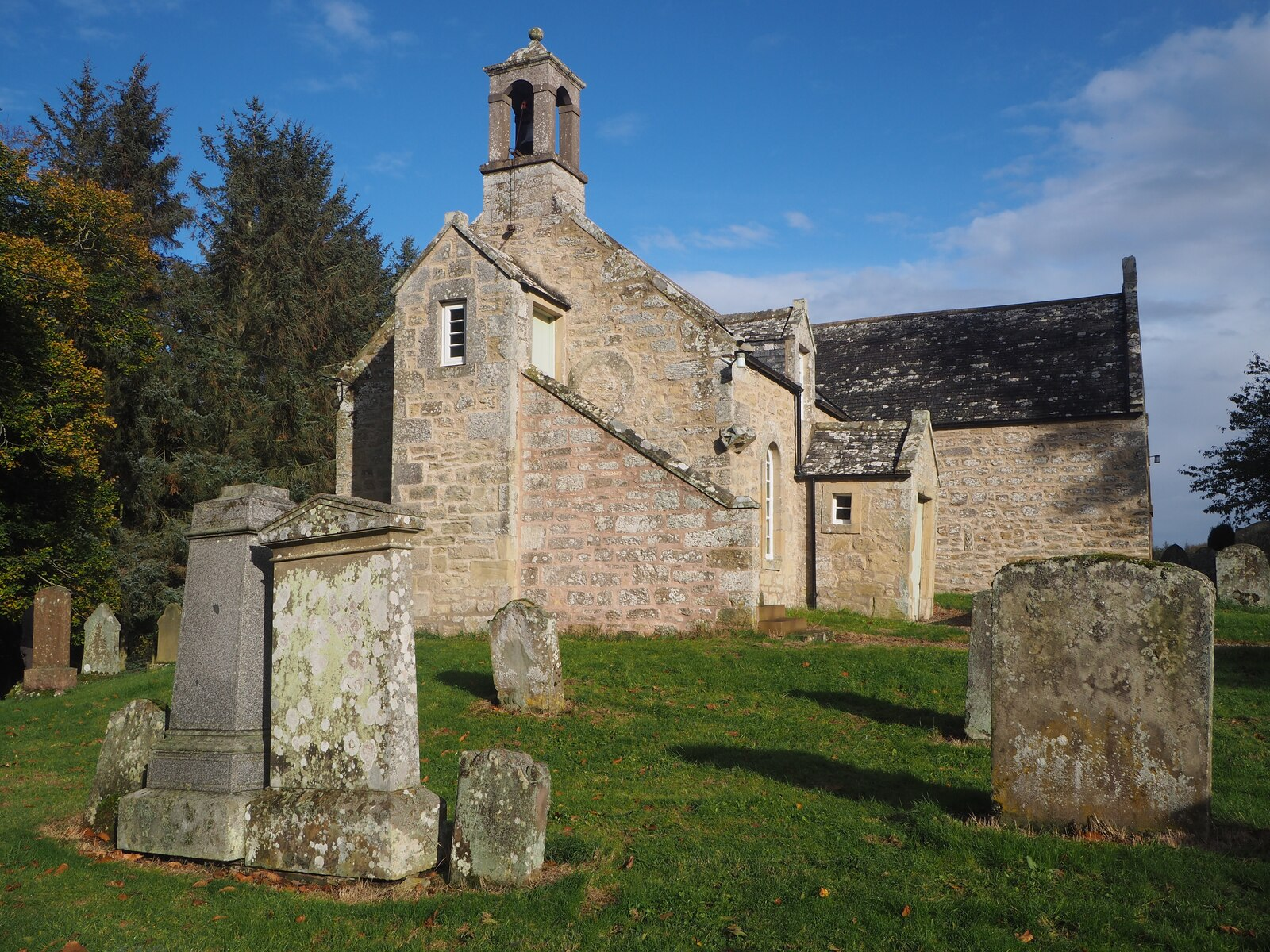
View towards southwest facade of Fogo Kirk, gravestones

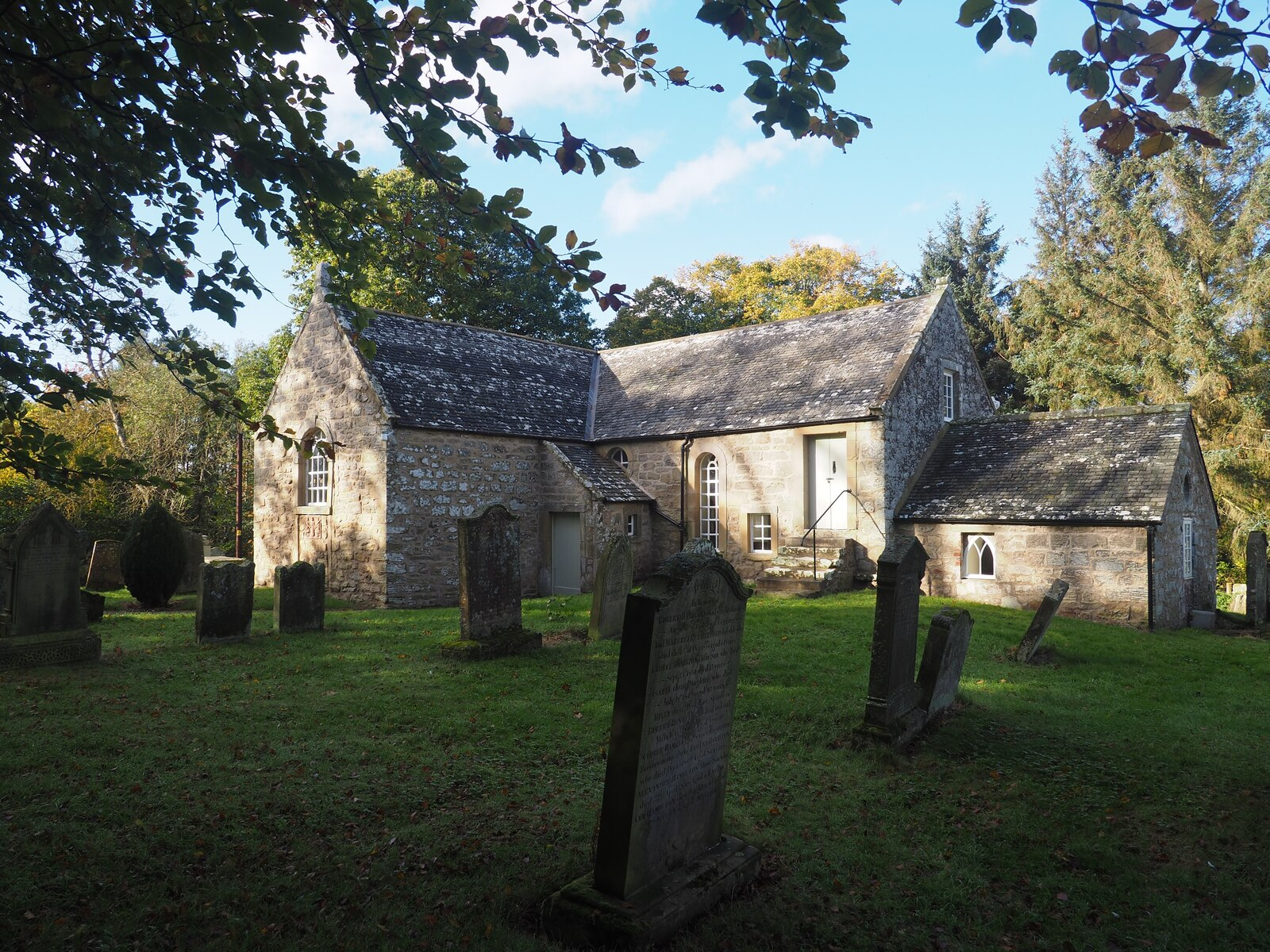
View towards southeastern facade of Fogo Kirk

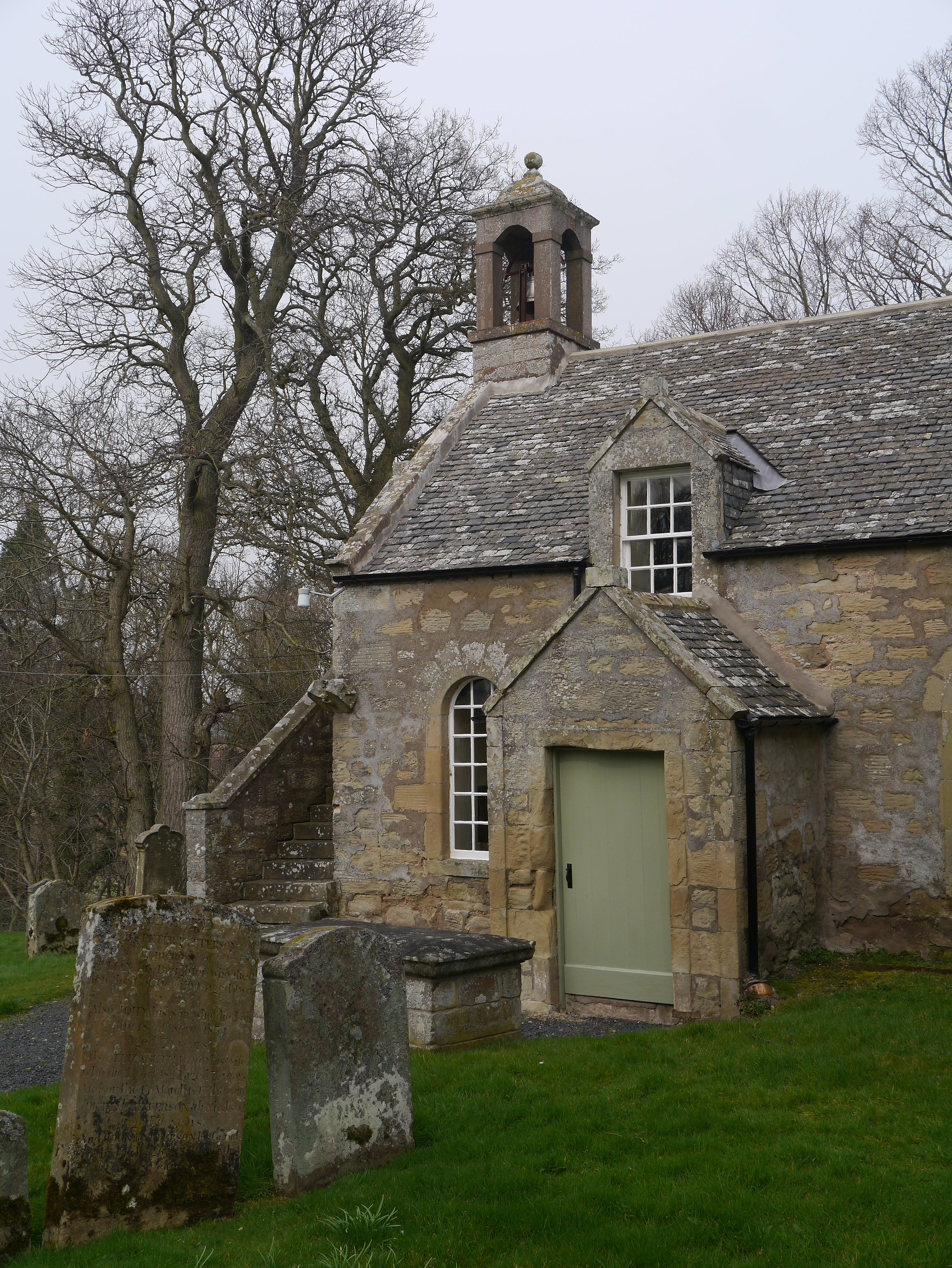
Fogo Kirk - Bell Tower

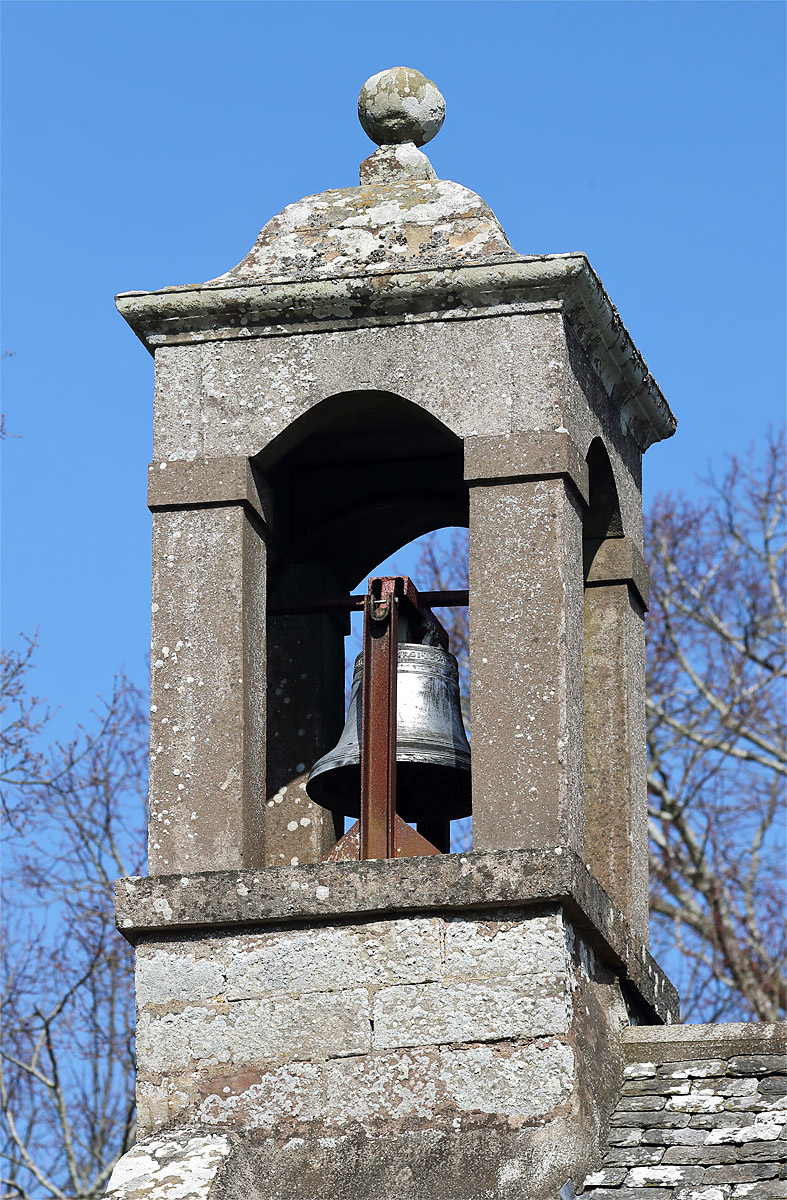
The belfry of Fogo Kirk

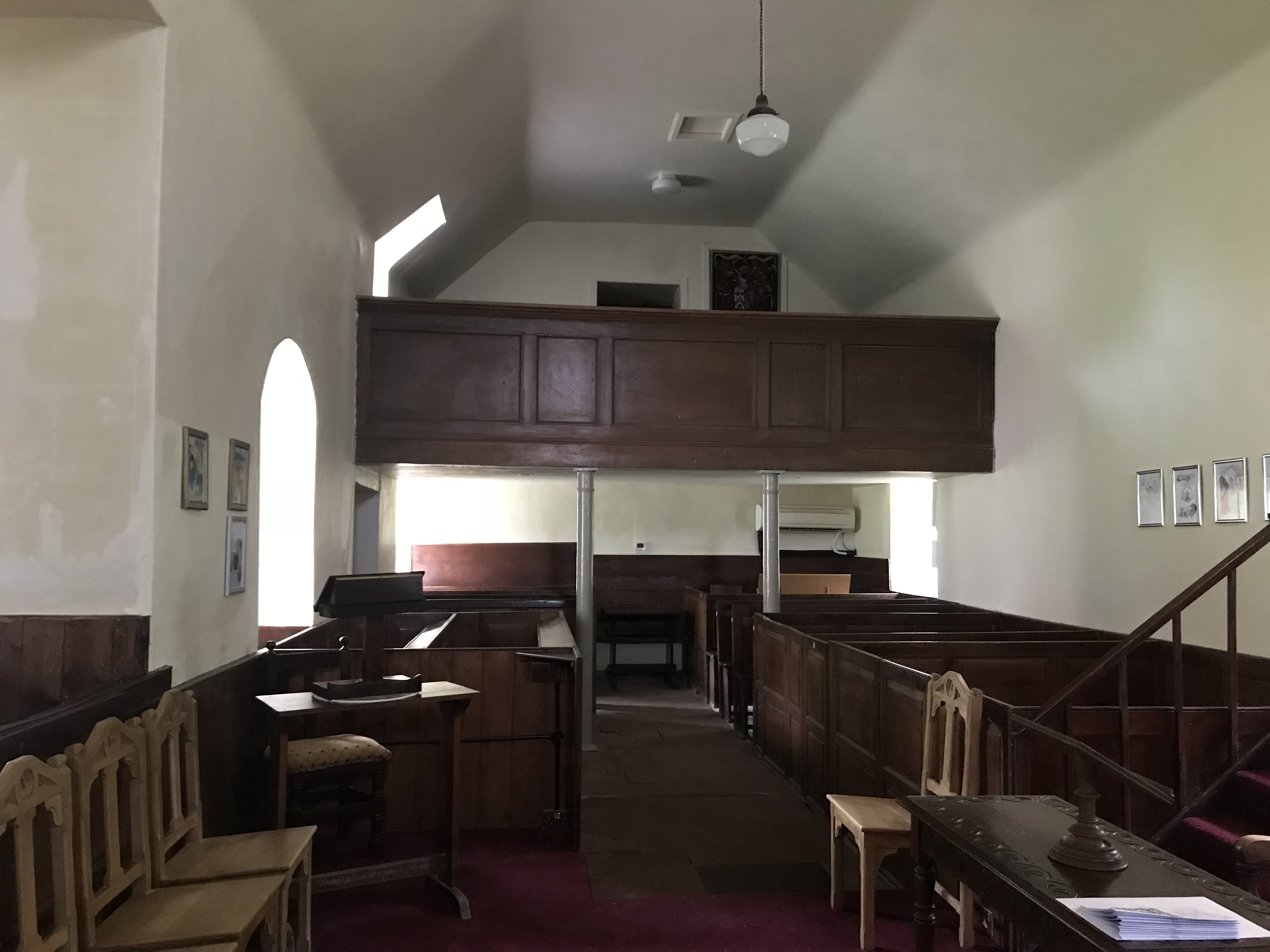
Inside Fogo Kirk

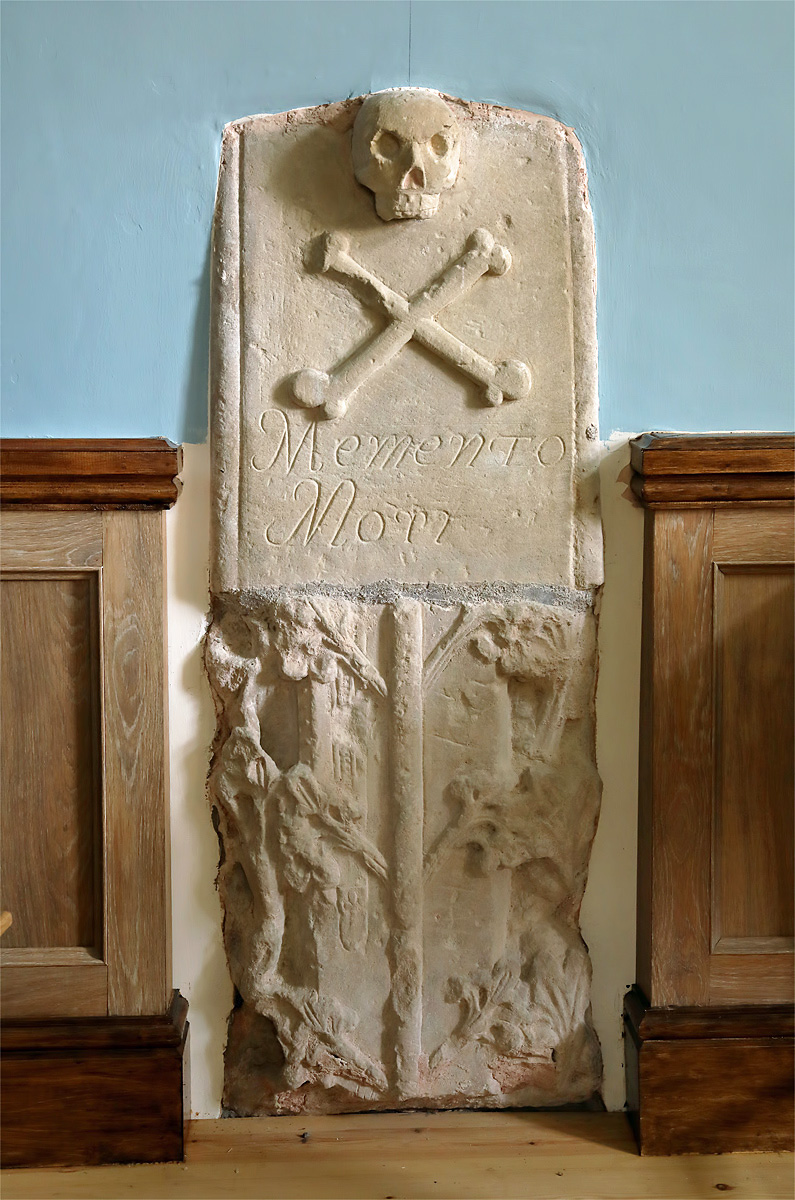
An old headstone inside Fogo Kirk

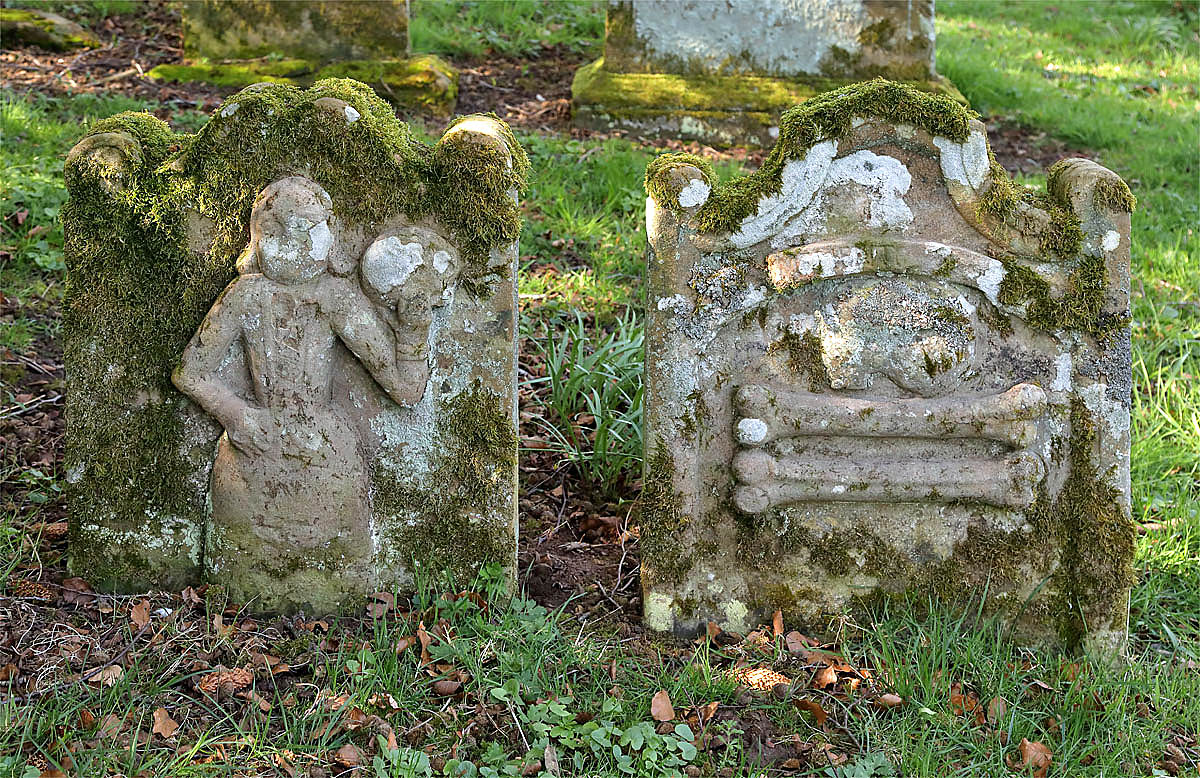
18th century symbolic gravestones at Fogo Kirkyard

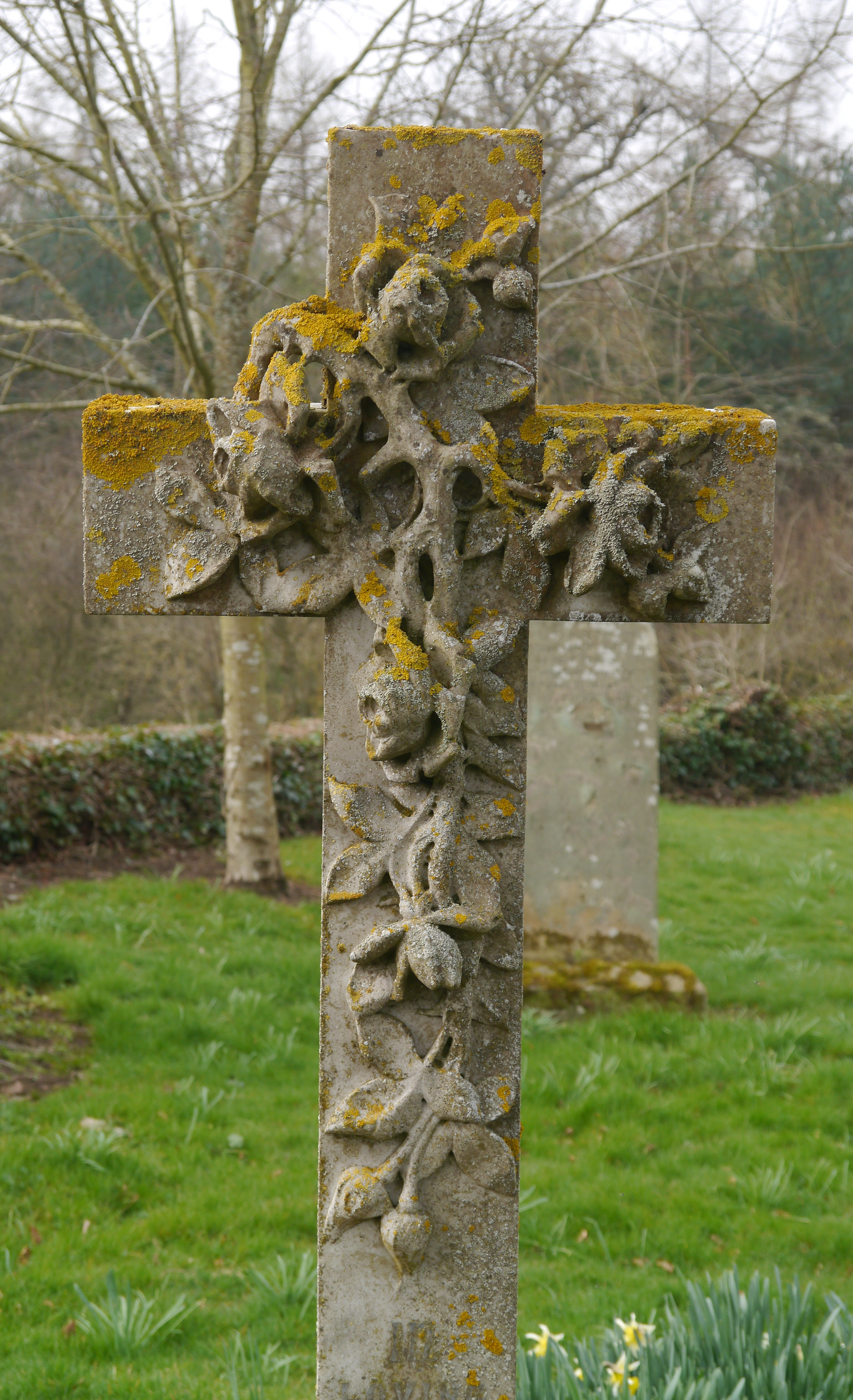
An Ornate Cross In Fogo Kirkyard

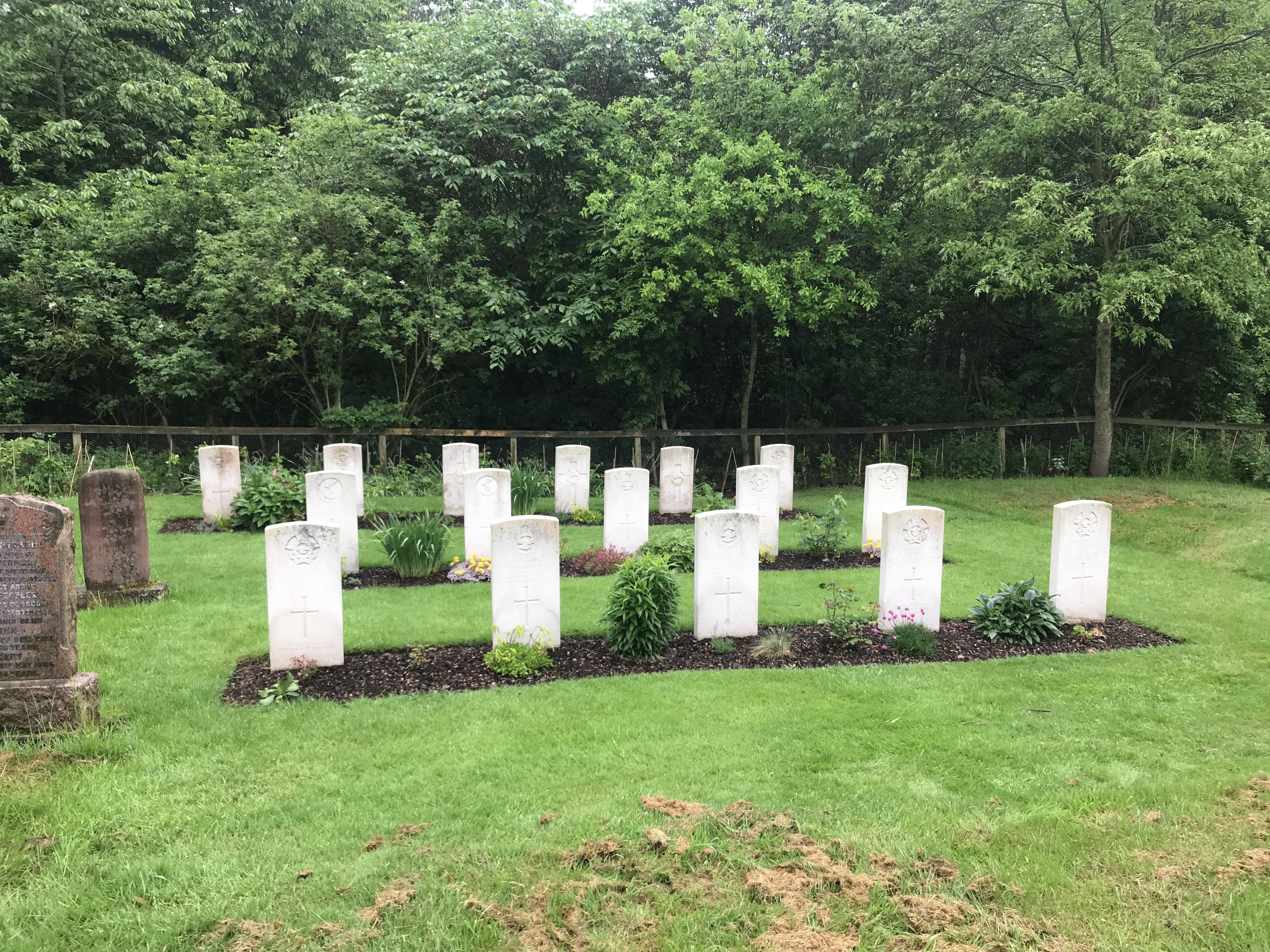
Commonwealth War Graves at Fogo Kirk

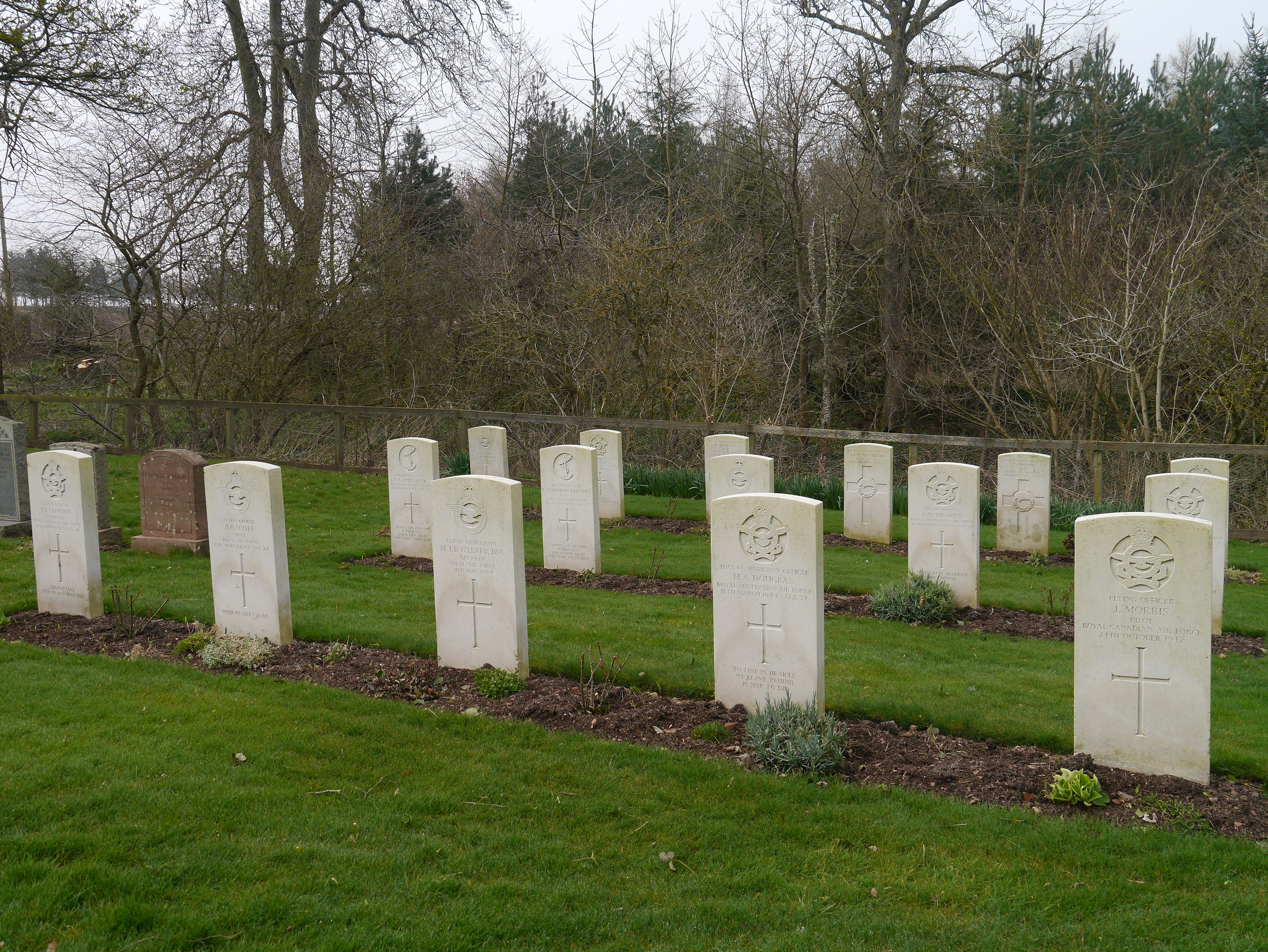
War graves, Fogo Kirkyard

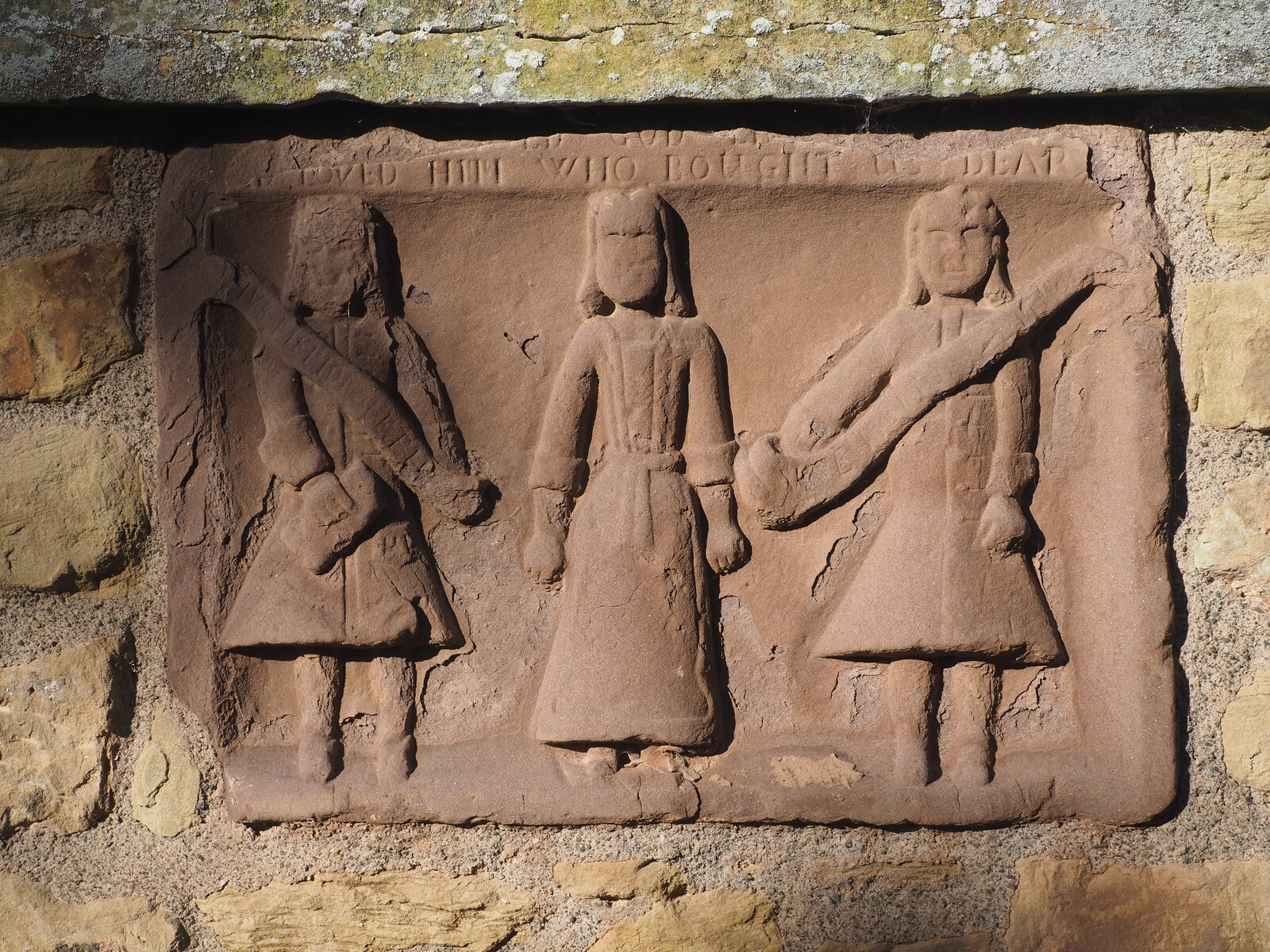
Ancient Carved Panel at Fogo Church

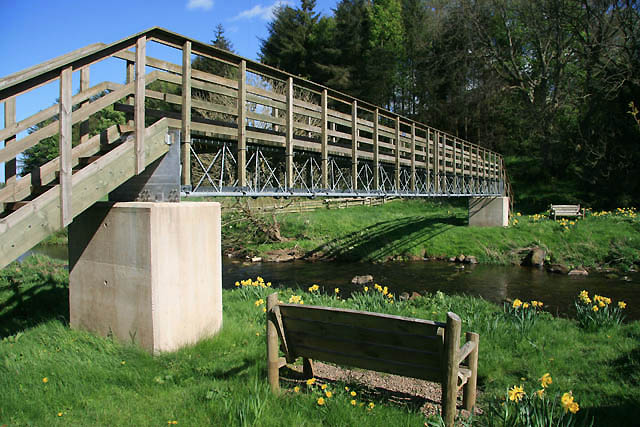
The John Hunter Footbridge over the Blackadder Water, acccessible by bypassing the churchyard

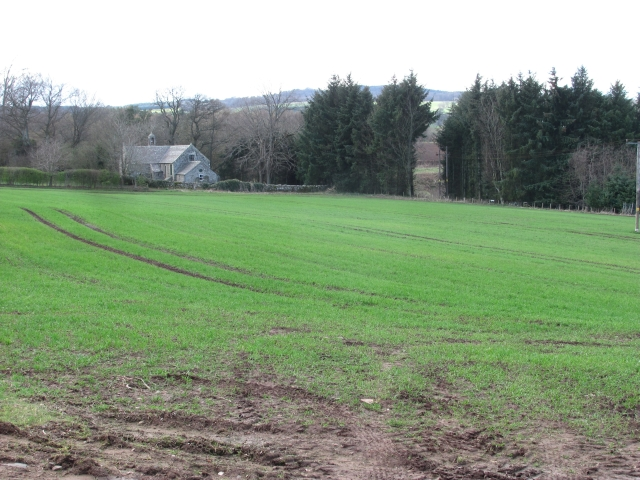
View from the east towards Fogo Kirk across an adjacent field

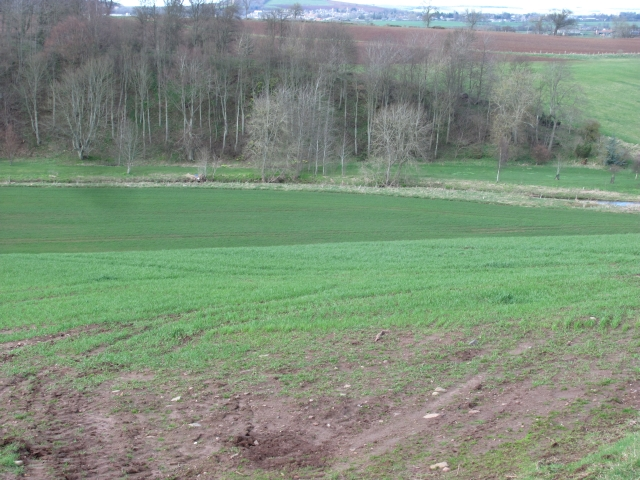
Arable land just to the east of Fogo along the Blackadder Water

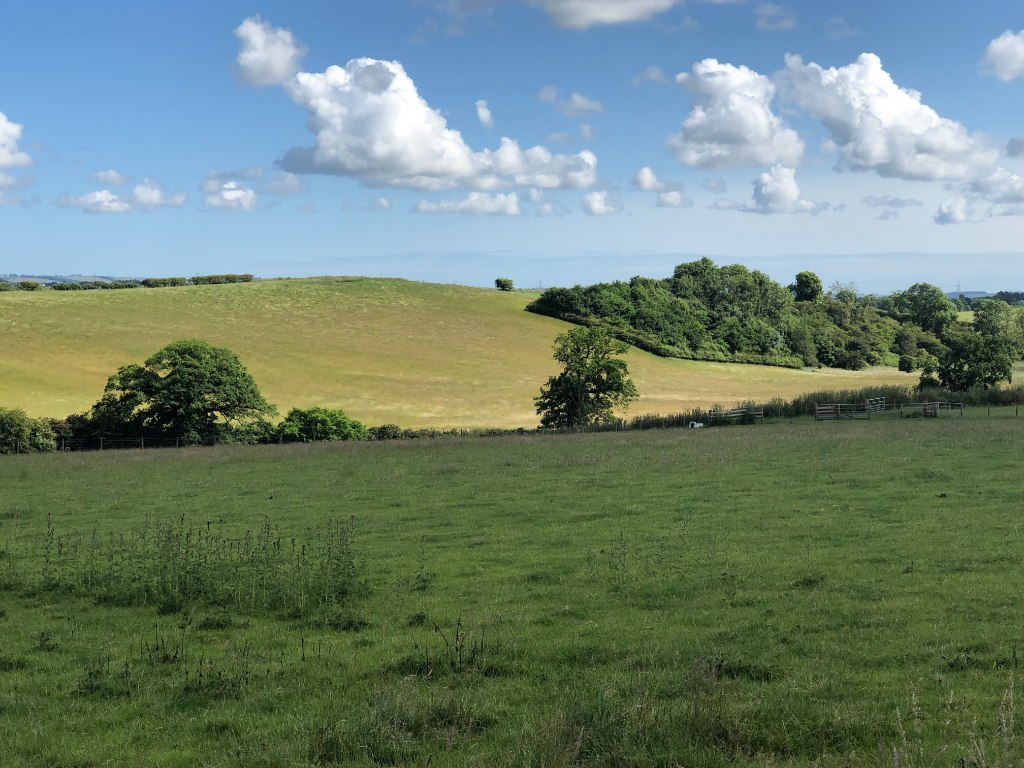
Farmland, Fogo, further downriver

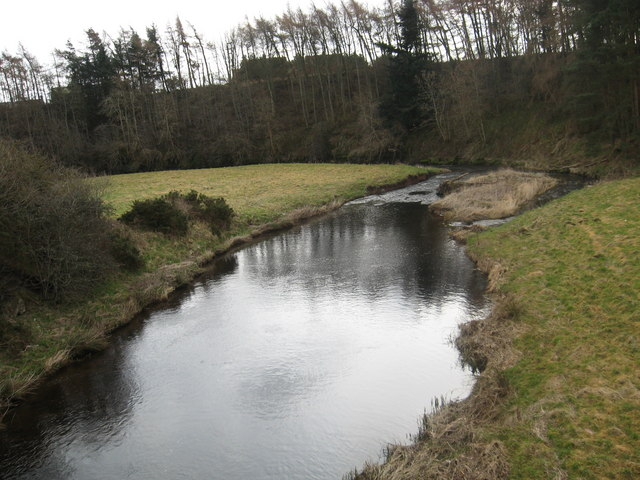
The Blackadder Water taken from Fogo Bridge, view downriver

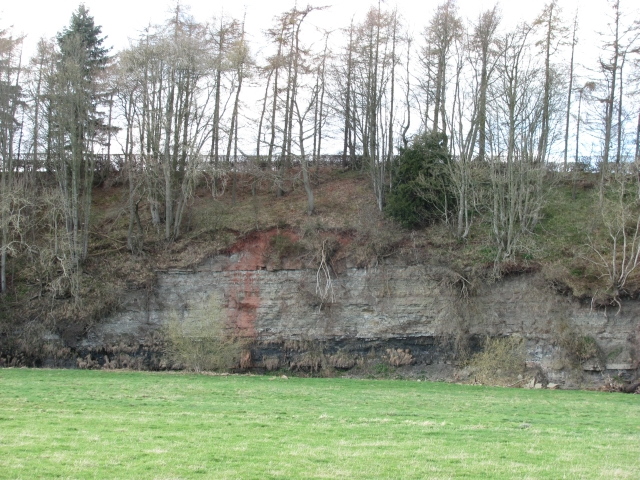
Crag, upriver from Fogo Bridge

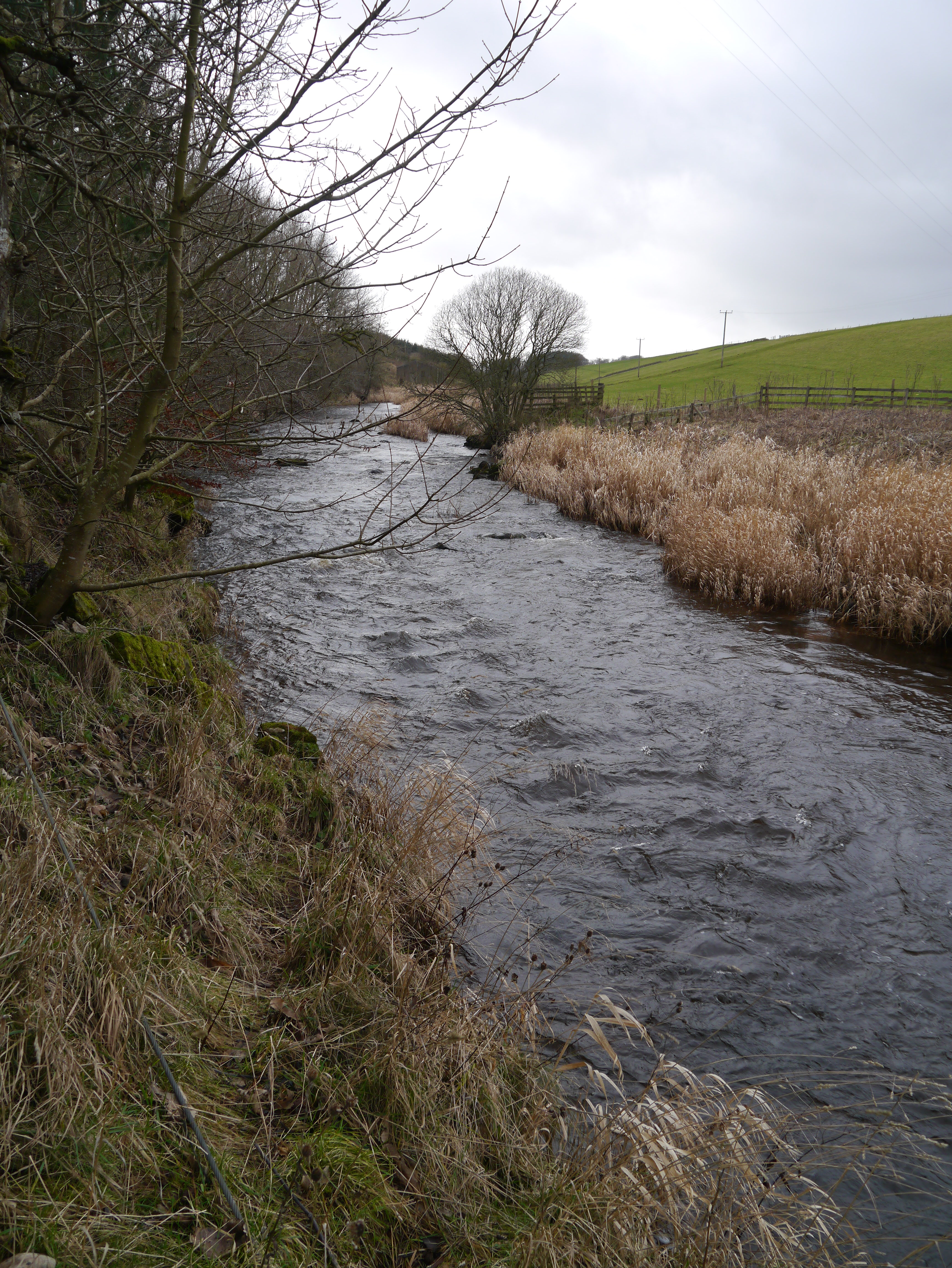
Blackadder mill lade inlet on the right, view downriver towards crag and Fogo Bridge around the river bend

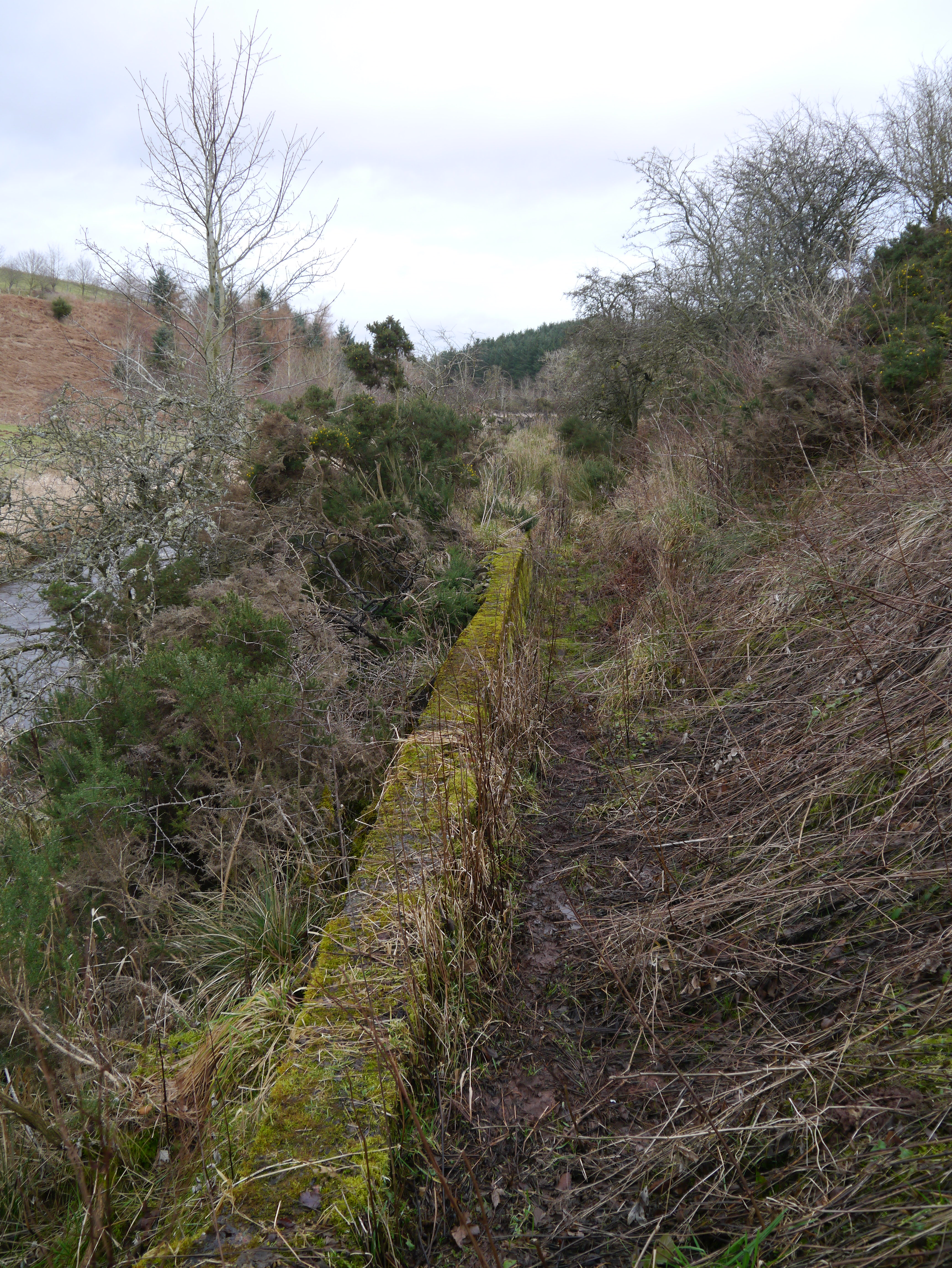
Mill Lade near Fogo, on the southern slope of the Blackadder valley

== Bibliography ==
Note: The first three of the following publications contain transscriptions of the manuscript collection 'Liber S. Marie de Calchou: registrum cartarum abbacie tironensis de Kelso, 1113-1567'. They are all available at 'archive.org', which enables full-text searches for (multiple) words, but only to the extent that imperfect character recognition software allows.

- A complete scan of Vol. 1 and 2, printed 1846, scanned 2008-01-11
- Scan of Vol. 1, printed 1846, scanned 2011-04-01
- Scan of Vol. 2, printed 1846, scanned 2009-07-15

Continual improvement of the character recognition software used in automated transscription programmes leads to better and more trustworthy results when scans of old typesets are processed at a later date with newer software versions. Thus an exemplary search for variations of the name "Fogo, foghou, ..." provides a larger set of results in the second and third editions, both of which were scanned later than the first.

- THE BANNATYNE CLUB (1846). Charta de Calchou as a complete scan of Vol. 1 and 2 of the book 'Liber S. Marie de Calchou: registrum cartarum abbacie tironensis de Kelso, 1113-1567' (in Latin and English). Ballantyne and Hughes, Edinburgh. Archived from the original on 11 January 2008. ""The preface is in English, the manuscripts are in Latin, including the original glyphs and ligatures"; >> Retrieval information: use search operator to simultaneously search for different spellings, such as 'foghou fogghou foggou ffoghouh ffogghou ffoggou ffoghoh ffogliouh fogliou ffoghouli FOGO' (result: found 45 instances, some with multiple occurrences of one or more of the search terms, three of the last four are corrupted versions due to failed recognition of individual characters by the automated transscription programme); 'Aldefoghou' (1 result)."
- THE BANNATYNE CLUB (1846). Charta de Calchou, Vol. 1, a reprint of the original manuscript collection of Kelso Abbey, original title 'Liber S. Marie de Calchou: registrum cartarum abbacie tironensis de Kelso, 1113-1567' (in Latin and English). Ballantyne and Hughes, Edinburgh. ""The preface is in English, the manuscripts are in Latin, including the original glyphs and ligatures" >> Retrieval information: use search operator to simultaneously search for different spellings, such as ' foghou % fogghou % fogho % foghov % foggou % ffoghou % ffoghouh % ffogghou % ffoggou % ffoghoh % fog % ftbghov % FooHOD % ffogliouh % ifoghoh % fogliou % ffoghouli % FooHoc' (result: found 41 instances, some with multiple occurrences of one or more of the search terms, the last eight are corrupted versions due to failed character regognition); 'Aldefoghou' (1 result)."
- THE BANNATYNE CLUB (1846). Charta de Calchou, Vol. 2, a reprint of the original manuscript collection of Kelso Abbey, original title 'Liber S. Marie de Calchou: registrum cartarum abbacie tironensis de Kelso, 1113-1567' (in Latin and English). Ballantyne and Hughes, Edinburgh. Archived from the original on 15 July 2009. "The preface is in English, the manuscripts are in Latin, including the original glyphs and ligatures" >> Retrieval information: use search operator to simultaneously search for different spellings, such as 'foghou fogghou fogho foggou FOGO' (result: found 14 instances, some with multiple occurrences of one or more of the search terms)."
- Bettelou Los; Chris Cummins; Lisa Gotthard; Alpo Honkapohja; Benjamin Molineaux (2022). English Historical Linguistics - Historical English in contact (search for term 'Aldefoghou') (PDF). John Benjamins Publishing Company. p. 86.
- Gemmill, Elizabeth; Mayhew, Nicholas (1995). "The assize of bread". Changing values in medieval Scotland, A study of prices, money, and weights and measures (PDF). Cambridge University Press. ISBN 978-0-521-47385-9. "David I's assize of bread, p. 30–31"
- Earl of Hertford (1891). "A CONTEMPORARY ACCOUNT OF THE EARL OF HERTFORD'S SECOND EXPEDITION TO SCOTLAND", Sept. 1545. doi:10.9750/PSAS.001.271.279. "scan of the typeset report"
