= Crosshall cross =

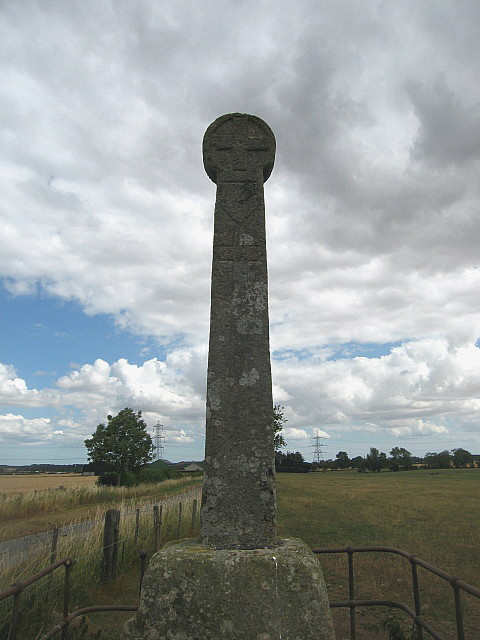
Image taken on 2006-07-30

The Crosshall Cross is a wheel-head cross near Crosshall Farm, Eccles, in the Scottish Borders area of Scotland, in the historic county of Berwickshire. According to a detailed description by Hardy (1882-84, page 366) it is 'One of the best preserved of the ancient historical monuments of the Merse district'.

In earlier days, before the Crosshall Farm was established (sometime between 1797 and 1821), the cross was known as the Eccles Cross due to its proximity to the priory and hamlet of Eccles. The nearest settlement although was Deadriggs, approx. 500 metres to the southwest, which has now completely vanished.

The cross is situated in a field (coordinates: 55.672705°N 2.381559°E) close to a road about 350 metres south-west of Crosshall farmhouse and is said to date from the 12th century, after the Second Crusade, 1147-49 CE. It is 452 centimetres (14 ft 10 inches) in height and is thought to commemorate someone who had been to the Holy Land.

The cross shaft is set in a sturdy stone socket which, in turn, is set atop a square base of masonry. On all sides the shaft tapers slightly up to the head. The aptly named wheel-head, an originally Celtic design, is 56 centimetres (1ft 10 inches) in diameter.

== Historical Attribution ==
According to local lore a governor of nearby Hume Castle was killed in a skirmish (R.D. Thomson 1845, page 56). In 1947 the Dumfriesshire and Galloway Natural History and Antiquarian Society published an article about the feudal family of de Soulis, whereby a Randolph de Solis died before 1170, his death being associated with "an old monument close to Eccles in Berwickshire". The article indicates that he may have been killed when repelling a Border raid.

The coats of arms engraved on two sides of the column shaft both depict three chevrons, two at the top of the shield, one centered below, all three pointed upwards. This is very similar to the image of a modernised triple upright chevron displayed on the external site Soulis Surname History & Family Crest.

The above facts give additional credit to the assumption stated by the corresponding Ordnance Survey record that the heraldry depicted on the Crosshall Cross may represent the Soulis family.

== Engravings ==
The two faces of the cylindrical wheel-head are oriented east-west and each displays the same simple cross relief set within an outer rim.

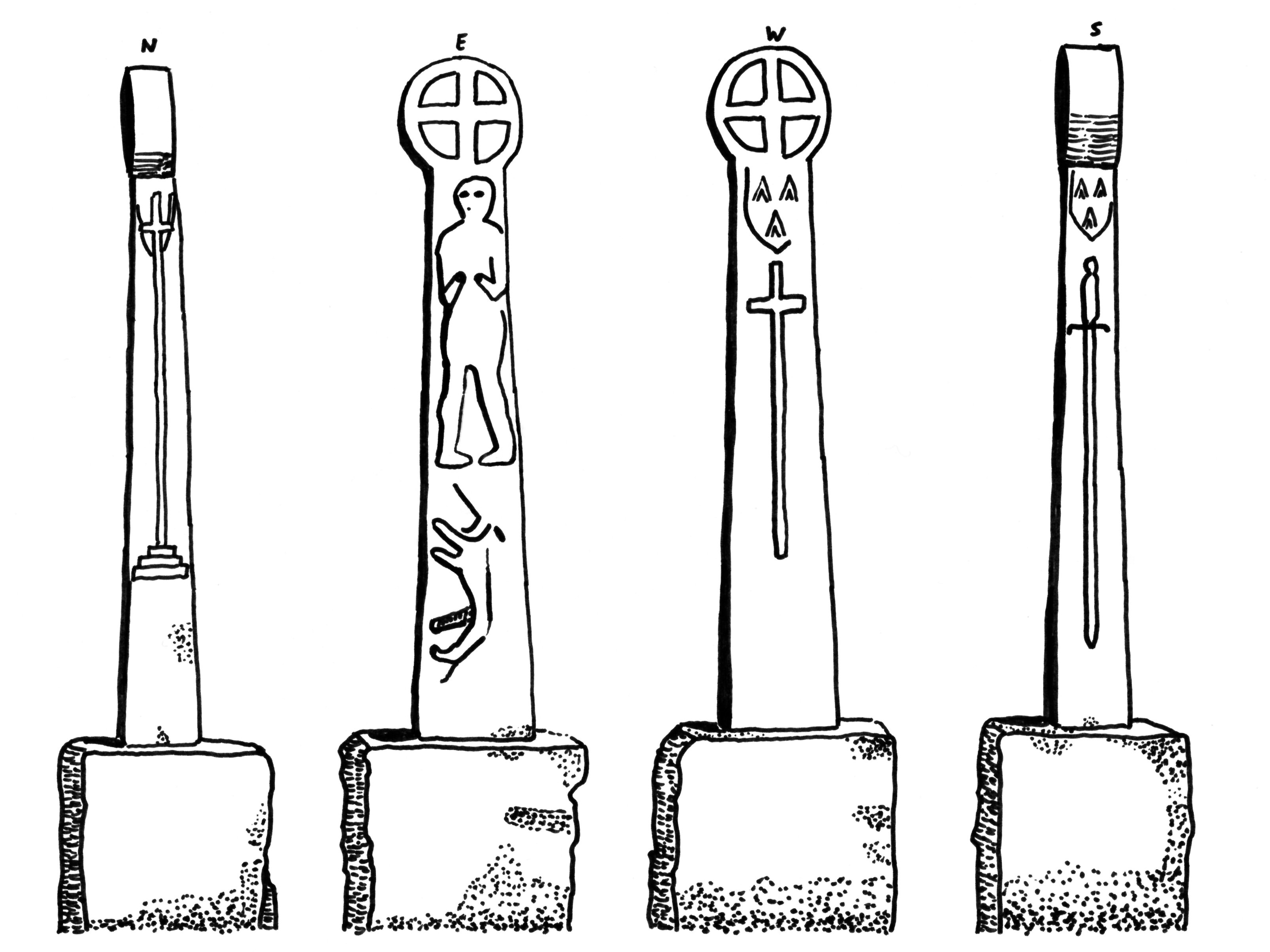
Crosshall Cross - views of all four sides with outlines of engraved figures; manually retraced from original OS index card

The four flanks of the cross shaft are engraved with the following figures.

- North flank (N): a latin cross placed on a calvary
- East flank (E): a male figure above a hound positioned upright
- West flank (W): a shield above a latin cross
- South flank (S): a shield above an upright longsword

The heraldic shields probably relate to the Soulis family.

No engravings are reported on the socket.

== Historical Descriptions ==
Descriptions of this monument differ greatly as to which images are recognisable on the various faces of this structure, but some authors report a host of details. A selection of reports:

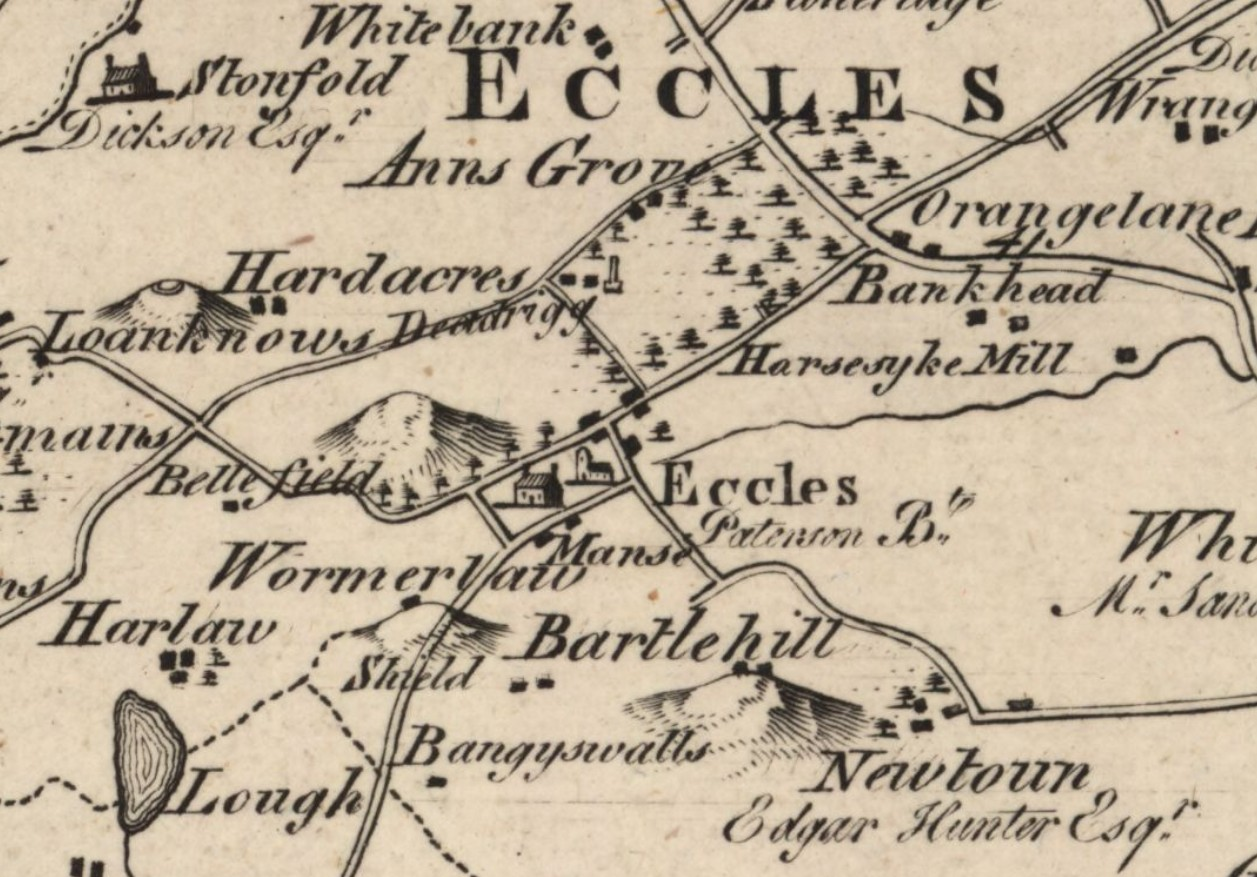
Excerpt from 1771 'Map of the County of Berwick, SE section'. A pillar symbol indicates the position of the Crosshall Cross, near the then existant place name 'Deadrigg'

- The 1854 edition of "The Imperial gazetteer of Scotland; or, Dictionary of Scottish topography", Section "Berwickshire", page 164, line 10 states: "... In the parish of Eccles, at Crosshall, there is an upright stone column, with various sculptures; but there is no inscription, nor is there any tradition concerning it."
- James Hardy (1882-84) described the cross in the late nineteenth century as: "One of the best preserved of the ancient historical monuments of the Merse district".
- In 2006, the cross was described as such: "a male figure and a hound on one face and a Latin cross on the other; one of the sides has a cross and the other a sword. Shields with unidentified arms are carved on one face and one side, just below the cross-head."

== Ordnance Survey Records ==
The original Ordnance Survey Records for this historical monument, location Crosshall, Eccles Cross, NT74SE 5, are preserved on the following index cards.

- Sketched outlines of the figures on all four sides of the cross / one photograph Ordnance Survey index card, Recto
- Description dated 2.8.1954 with references from 1792 to 1954 Ordnance Survey index card, page number 1, Recto.
  Note: date of Second Crusade therein incorrectly stated as 1114 CE.
- Description continued from 1955 to 1980 Ordnance Survey index card, page number 2, Verso

== Images ==
A collection of photographs, sketches, and paintings of the Cross from various angles previously provided by canmore.org.uk, now supplemented by RCAHMS and Ordnance Survey records, has been transferred to a more generalised site, hosted by Historic Environment Scotland.

== Adjacent Cottages ==
On the opposite (northern) side of the road that passes the cross once stood a row of houses, now demolished (2024).
An older painting (ca. 1850) from the above stated collection depicts two entrances to adjacent, presumably thatched roof houses.
Two photographs of the cross taken during the following century, approx. 1960, from a position in the field behind the cross display the then-existant row of 5 slate-roofed houses.

== Nearby Places ==
Other places nearby include Eccles, Fogo, Gavinton, the Greenknowe Tower, Greenlaw, Hume Castle, Leitholm, Longformacus, Polwarth, Westruther.

== See also ==
- List of places in the Scottish Borders
- List of places in Scotland
