= William Baird (physician) =

Scottish physician and zoologist

- Died: 27 January 1872
- Alma mater: University of Edinburgh; Trinity College Dublin; University of Paris; Royal High School
- Occupation: Medical doctor, zoologist
- Employer: British Museum

William Baird FRS FLS (11 January 1803, in Eccles, Berwickshire – 27 January 1872) was a Scottish physician and zoologist best known for his 1850 work, The Natural History of the British Entomostraca.

== Biography ==
Baird studied at the High School of Edinburgh, before studying medicine at the universities of Edinburgh, Dublin, and Paris. He was a surgeon for the East India Company from 1823 to 1833, travelling to India, China and other countries, and taking a keen interest in those countries' natural history. He helped found the Berwickshire Naturalists' Club in 1829, and contributed regularly to its publications. Baird practised as a doctor in London until 1841, when he joined the zoology department of the British Museum (now part of the Natural History Museum), where he worked until his death. He is buried in the Kensal Green Cemetery, London.

== Work ==
Baird's most important work, The Natural History of the British Entomostraca, was published by the Ray Society in 1850. He published many other papers on diverse topics, and in 1858 he published a popular Cyclopædia of the Natural Sciences. He was a Fellow of the Linnean Society, a member of the Imperial and Royal Botanical Society of Vienna and a Fellow of the Royal Society.

== See also ==
- Entomostraca
