= Prior of Fogo =

The Prior of Fogo was the head of the Tironensian monastic community and lands of Fogo Priory, Roxburghshire, founded sometime between 1253 and 1297. The patron was a local landlord named Patrick Corbet, who granted lands to Kelso Abbey to establish a cell there. Although almost none of the priors are known, the following two are recorded:

- William Leischmann, 1465–1466
- Andrew Leslie, 1537

== See also ==
- Abbot of Kelso
- Fogo Priory
- Fogo, Scottish Borders

== Bibliography ==
- Cowan, Ian B. & Easson, David E., Medieval Religious Houses: Scotland With an Appendix on the Houses in the Isle of Man, Second edition, (London, 1976), p. 67
- Watt, D. E. R. & Shead, N. F. (eds.), The Heads of Religious Houses in Scotland from the 12th to the 16th Centuries, The Scottish Records Society, New Series, Volume 24, (Edinburgh, 2001), p. 83
