= Eccles, Scottish Borders =

Village in Scottish Borders, Scotland

Coordinates: 55.666°N 2.375°W

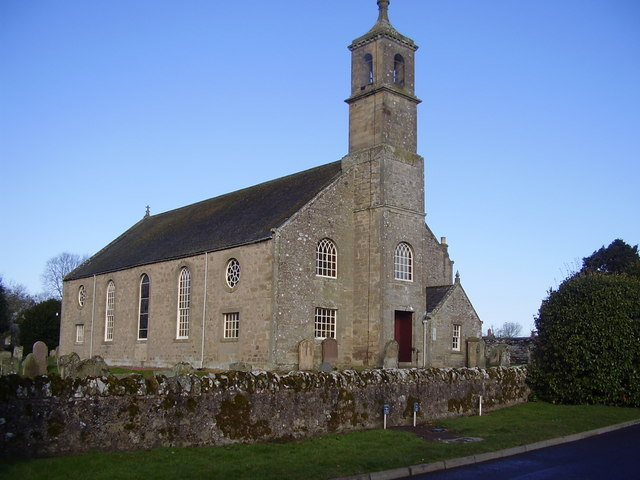

Eccles (Scottish Gaelic: An Eaglais. Brythonic/Welsh: Eglwys) is a village and agricultural parish near Kelso in Berwickshire in the Scottish Borders area of Scotland. The village is conjoined with Birgham and Leitholm.

== Etymology ==
Like other 'Eccles'-names in Britain, this is taken to derive from the Brittonic word which survives in Welsh as eglwys 'church'. The word was originally borrowed into Brittonic from Latin ecclesia.

== History ==
It is said that there was a Christian enclave at Eccles in the 6th century or possibly before. Watson gives the derivation as most likely from the Welsh (or Cumbric) eglwys meaning church and places with this name element are thought to indicate ancient Christian sites. Gospatric, Earl of Dunbar (or his wife) founded St. Mary's Cistercian convent at Eccles in 1156.

Regent Albany stayed at Eccles Priory in November 1522 during an unsuccessful siege of Wark Castle. It was burnt by the Earl of Hertford's forces in 1545, then laicised to the Home family. Only two barrel-vaulted cells of the east range at the west end of the churchyard survive as well as architectural fragments built into later garden walls, although the parish church, rebuilt in 1774, may include some mediaeval stones. Patrick I, Earl of Dunbar, who died on 31 December 1232, was interred in the convent at Eccles.

== Lairds ==
The principal landed proprietors in the vicinity of Eccles in 1696 appears to have been George Home of Kames (which is situated towards Birgham) who had 9 hearths, Purves Hall, then occupied by Marjory Flemming, had twelve hearths, and Simon Marjoribanks of Stainrig who had six. (Purveshall and Stainrig are closer to Leithholm than Eccles). In 1843 it was James Greig who resided at Eccles House, which abuts the village.

== Kirk ==
The Church of Scotland Parish Church, rebuilt in 1774, is a large 5-bay building with some stained glass windows (notably the 'War Memorial Window') in 'Gothick' glazing-patterned sashes in round-headed openings. There is a vernacular bell-tower at the east end holding a bell dated 1659. The last additions and internal alterations were carried out in 1930. The earliest Presbyterian Minister appears to be Robert French, who was at Eccles from 1567 to 1574. The Reverend John Lauder, who had previously been the incumbent at Lilliesleaf, was ordained into Eccles 28 May 1691, when objectors opposed to him interrupted the ceremony. Two of these were Richard Edgar of Newtoun, (an Episcopalian and opposed to the government of William & Mary), and Henry Home of Kames. Reverend Lauder from Eccles was a member of the General Assembly in 1692. On Sunday 31 March 1695 Mr. Lauder was not present at Eccles to take the service, he "being sent to preach in the north as is ordered by the last Assembly that every Presbytery should send so many quarterly there." He was succeeded at Eccles by the Reverend Matthew Dysart MA, on 9 September 1729, Lauder having died in July that year. Dysart remained the incumbent at Eccles for a staggering forty three years.

Today Eccles is conjoined with the parishes of Birgham and Leitholm.

== Notable residents ==
- Possibly the district's most famous son is Henry Home, Lord Kames.
- William Baird (physician) (1803-1872), physician and zoologist
- William Barron (1805-1891), landscape gardener and park designer, born here
- Thomas Creak Craik was a resident of both Eccles and Temple Village. He was one of the early modern farmers and owned Whitrig Farm, but the family also managed other properties. In 1832 Thomas funded the building of a New Church, in Temple Village.

== In popular culture ==
The village was also mentioned in Wolfbloods Dark rune episode.

== See also ==
- Crosshall cross
- List of places in the Scottish Borders
- List of places in Scotland
