= Fogo Priory =

Monastery in Scottish Borders, Scotland

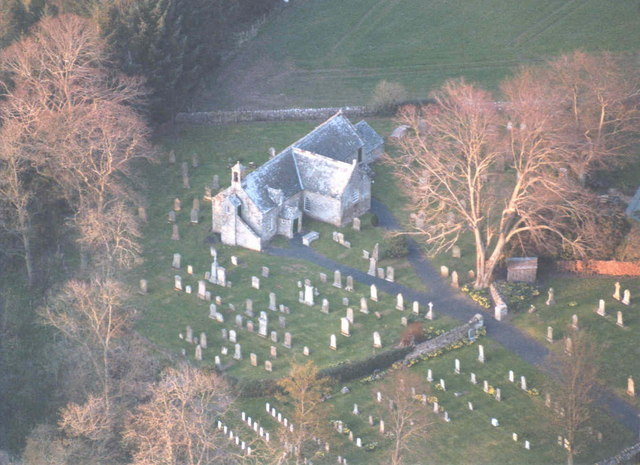
- Interactive map of Fogo Priory

Monastery information
- Full name: Priory of St Nicholas of Fogo
- Established: 1253 x 1297
- Mother house: Kelso Abbey (dependency)
- Dedication: Saint Nicholas
- Diocese: Diocese of St Andrews

People
- Founder: Patrick Corbet

Site
- Location: Fogo, Scottish Borders (Berwickshire), Scotland

Fogo Priory was the a Tironensian monastic community in Berwickshire, Scottish Borders, dedicated to Saint Nicholas. It was founded sometime between 1253 and 1297 by a local landlord named Patrick Corbet, who granted lands to Kelso Abbey in order to establish a cell there. Only two of the priors of Fogo are known.

== See also ==
- Fogo, Scottish Borders
- Prior of Fogo
- List of places in the Scottish Borders
- List of places in Scotland

== Bibliography ==
- Cowan, Ian B. & Easson, David E., Medieval Religious Houses: Scotland With an Appendix on the Houses in the Isle of Man, Second Edition, (London, 1976), p. 67
- Watt, D.E.R. & Shead, N.F. (eds.), The Heads of Religious Houses in Scotland from the 12th to the 16th Centuries, The Scottish Records Society, New Series, Volume 24, (Edinburgh, 2001), p. 83
