= Subtriquetra subtriquetra =

Scientific classification
- Kingdom: Animalia
- Phylum: Arthropoda
- Class: Ichthyostraca
- Order: Porocephalida
- Family: Subtriquetridae
- Genus: Subtriquetra
- Species: S. subtriquetra

Binomial name
- Subtriquetra subtriquetra (Diesing, 1836)

Synonyms
- Pentastoma subtriquetrum Diesing, 1836; Pentastomum pusillum Diesing, 1856

Species of tongue worm

Subtriquetra subtriquetra is a species of tongue worm in the genus Subtriquetra, of which it is also the type species. It has a free-living larval stage.
