= Leitholm =

Village in Scottish Borders, Scotland

Coordinates: 55°41′N 2°20′W

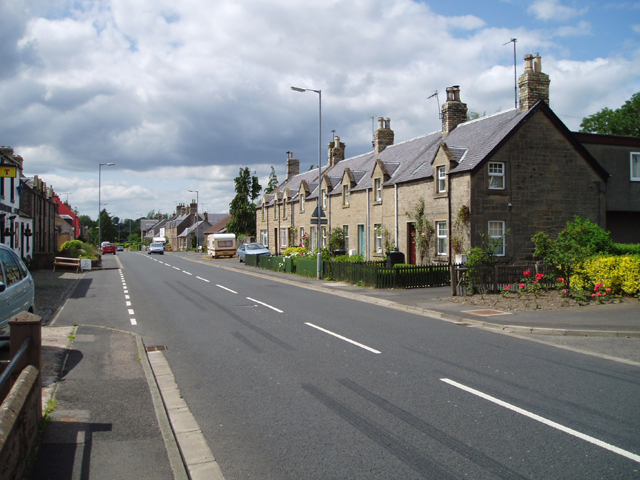
Main Street, Leitholm

Leitholm (/ˈliːtəm/) is a village in the Scottish Borders area of Scotland, 4 miles (6.4 km) north-west of Coldstream, in the former county of Berwickshire.

Other places nearby include the Crosshall cross, Duns, Eccles, Ednam, Fogo, Greenlaw, Hume Castle, Polwarth, Westruther.

== See also ==
- List of places in the Scottish Borders
- List of places in Scotland
