= List of Netelia species =

There are over 330 species in the genus Netelia.

== Species (335) ==
=== Subgenus Amebachia ===
- Netelia baibarana Uchida, 1928
- Netelia fulvistigma Konishi, 2010
- Netelia laevis (Cameron, 1905)^{c g}
- Netelia rasilella Konishi, 2010
- Netelia vicinalis Konishi, 2010
- Netelia yoshimatsui Konishi, 2010

=== Subgenus Apatagium ===
- Netelia coreana (Uchida, 1928)
- Netelia dayaoshanensis He & Chen, 1996^{c g}
- Netelia harmani Gauld, 1983^{c g}
- Netelia inaequalis (Uchida, 1934)^{c g}
- Netelia labi Gauld, 1983^{c g}
- Netelia longicauda Konishi, 1986^{c g}
- Netelia macrostigma (Enderlein, 1912)^{c g}
- Netelia obesis Gauld, 1983^{c g}
- Netelia okinawana Konishi, 1996^{c g}
- Netelia pagoni Gauld, 1983^{c g}
- Netelia retaki Gauld, 1983^{c g}
- Netelia smithii (Dalla Torre, 1901)^{c b}
- Netelia tristrigata (Enderlein, 1912)^{c g}
- Netelia vulgaris Konishi, 1986^{c g}
- Netelia zhejiangensis He & Chen, 1996^{c g}

=== Subgenus Bessobates ===
- Netelia comitor Tolkanitz, 1974^{c g}
- Netelia coreensis Cha & Lee, 1988^{c g}
- Netelia cristata (Thomson, 1888)^{c g}
- Netelia deceptor (Morley, 1913)^{c g b}
- Netelia frankii (Brauns, 1889)^{c g}
- Netelia frenata Tolkanitz, 1981^{c g}
- Netelia gansuana (Kokujev, 1906)^{c}
- Netelia kiuhabona (Uchida, 1928)^{c g}
- Netelia latungula (Thomson, 1888)^{c g b}
- Netelia longipad Konishi, 2014^{g}
- Netelia longipalpus Townes 1939
- Netelia maculifemorata (Uchida, 1928)^{c g}
- Netelia nanaki Kaur & Jonathan, 1979^{c g}
- Netelia nigridorsalis Konishi, 2014^{g}
- Netelia nodai Konishi, 2014^{g}
- Netelia pallescens (Schmiedeknecht, 1910)^{c g}
- Netelia rogersi Townes, 1939^{c g b}
- Netelia sinus Townes, 1939^{c g b}
- Netelia uncata Townes, 1939^{c g b}
- Netelia virgata (Geoffroy, 1785)^{c g}
- Netelia yakushimensis Konishi, 2014^{g}
- Netelia yamatoensis (Uchida, 1934)^{c g}

=== Subgenus Longiterebates ===
- Netelia auberti Kaur & Jonathan, 1979^{c g}
- Netelia grandis Kaur & Jonathan, 1979^{c g}
- Netelia himalayensis Kaur & Jonathan, 1976^{c g}
- Netelia interstitialis (Cameron, 1899)^{c g}
- Netelia longitibiata Lee & Cha, 1996^{c g}
- Netelia reclivousa Kaur & Jonathan, 1979^{c g}
- Netelia turgida Kaur & Jonathan, 1979^{c g}

=== Subgenus Monomacrodon ===
- Netelia bicolor (Cushman, 1934)^{c}
- Netelia elumbis (Tosquinet, 1903)^{c g}

=== Subgenus Netelia ===
- Netelia aberrans Townes, Townes & Gupta, 1961^{c g}
- Netelia acuminata Townes, 1939^{c g b}
- Netelia aequora Kaur & Jonathan, 1979^{c g}
- Netelia aethiopica (Szepligeti, 1907)^{c}
- Netelia affinis Townes, 1939^{c g b}
- Netelia alpina (Rudow, 1886)^{c}
- Netelia amamiensis Konishi, 2005^{c g}
- Netelia antipodum (Vachal, 1907)^{c g}
- Netelia appendiculata (Provancher, 1874)^{c g b}
- Netelia areator (Schiodte, 1839)^{c g}
- Netelia areoleta Nikam & Rao, 1972^{c g}
- Netelia armeniaca Tolkanitz, 1971^{c g}
- Netelia aspera (Enderlein, 1912)^{c g}
- Netelia atlantor Aubert, 1971^{c g}
- Netelia arabs (Strand, 1911)^{c g}
- Netelia atra Tolkanitz, 1999^{c g}
- Netelia basirufa (Strand, 1911)^{c g}
- Netelia blantoni Townes, 1939^{c g b}
- Netelia brasiliensis (Szepligeti, 1906)^{c}
- Netelia brevicornis (Cushman, 1924)^{c b}
- Netelia brunnea Townes, 1939^{c g b}
- Netelia californica (Cushman, 1924)^{c g b}
- Netelia calva Townes, 1939^{c g b}
- Netelia capensis (Holmgren, 1868)^{c g}
- Netelia carmichaeli Kaur & Jonathan, 1979^{c g}
- Netelia cascadica Townes, 1939^{c g b}
- Netelia caudata Townes, 1939^{c g b}
- Netelia celebensis (Szepligeti, 1906)^{c}
- Netelia ceylonica (Cameron, 1897)^{c}
- Netelia chloris (Olivier, 1811)^{c g b}
- Netelia cockerelli (Cushman, 1924)^{c g b}
- Netelia columbiana (Enderlein, 1912)^{c g}
- Netelia constricta (Morley, 1913)^{c g}
- Netelia contraria (Morley, 1913)^{c g}
- Netelia coriaria (Enderlein, 1912)^{c g}
- Netelia corrugata Kaur & Jonathan, 1979^{c g}
- Netelia cushmani Townes, 1939^{c g b}
- Netelia delicata Townes, 1939^{c g b}
- Netelia densa Townes, 1939^{c g b}
- Netelia denticulator Aubert, 1969^{c g}
- Netelia dilatata (Thomson, 1888)^{c g}
- Netelia dimidiata (Morley, 1913)^{c}
- Netelia dolabra Kaur & Jonathan, 1979^{c g}
- Netelia ehilis (Cheesman, 1936)^{c g}
- Netelia emorsa Townes, 1939^{c g b}
- Netelia ephippiata (Smith, 1876)^{c g}
- Netelia errans (Tosquinet, 1896)^{c g}
- Netelia exareolata (Meyer, 1933)^{c g}
- Netelia facialis Kaur & Jonathan, 1979^{c g}
- Netelia falcata Townes, 1939^{c g b}
- Netelia felix (Strand, 1911)^{c g}
- Netelia fijiensis (Brues, 1922)^{c g}
- Netelia flavitarsis (Enderlein, 1912)^{c g}
- Netelia formosana (Matsumura, 1912)^{c g}
- Netelia fractivena (Enderlein, 1912)^{c g}
- Netelia fulvator Delrio, 1971^{c g}
- Netelia fumosa Kaur & Jonathan, 1979^{c g}
- Netelia fuscicarpus (Kokujev, 1899)
- Netelia fuscicornis (Holmgren, 1860)^{c g}
- Netelia gerlingi (Schrottky, 1902)^{c g}
- Netelia gigantia Nikam, 1973^{c g}
- Netelia gotoi Konishi, 2005^{c g}
- Netelia gracilis (Morley, 1913)^{c g}
- Netelia grumi (Kokujev, 1906)
- Netelia herero (Enderlein, 1914)^{c}
- Netelia heroica Townes, 1939^{c g b}
- Netelia idioctenus Townes, 1939^{c g b}
- Netelia ignota (Morley, 1913)^{c g}
- Netelia imitatrix Kaur & Jonathan, 1979^{c g}
- Netelia incommunis (Szepligeti, 1906)^{c g}
- Netelia indica (Rao & Grover, 1960)^{c}
- Netelia indicata Gupta, 1987^{c g}
- Netelia inepta Townes, 1939^{c g b}
- Netelia infractor Delrio, 1971^{c g}
- Netelia ingrata Townes, 1939^{c g b}
- Netelia insulicola (Morley, 1913)^{c g}
- Netelia intermedia (Cameron, 1905)^{c g}
- Netelia kashmirensis (Cameron, 1906)^{c g}
- Netelia kusigematii Konishi, 2005^{c g}
- Netelia kyushuensis Konishi, 2005^{c g}
- Netelia lativectis Townes, 1939^{c g b}
- Netelia leo (Cushman, 1924)^{c g b}
- Netelia levisulca Kaur & Jonathan, 1979^{c g}
- Netelia ligata Townes, 1939^{c g b}
- Netelia lineata (Brulle, 1846)^{c}
- Netelia liopleuris (Szepligeti, 1906)^{c g}
- Netelia lobata Townes, 1973^{c g}
- Netelia lucens Townes, 1939^{c g b}
- Netelia lucidula (Szepligeti, 1906)^{c g}
- Netelia luteola (Tosquinet, 1896)^{c}
- Netelia luteostigma (Strand, 1911)^{c g}
- Netelia macra Townes, 1939^{c g b}
- Netelia madagascariensis (Enderlein, 1912)^{c}
- Netelia media (Ashmead, 1894)^{c g}
- Netelia melanogaster (Cameron, 1906)^{c g}
- Netelia melanopus (Brulle, 1846)^{c g}
- Netelia melanostigma (Cameron, 1886)^{c}
- Netelia melanura (Thomson, 1888)^{c g}
- Netelia meridionator Aubert, 1960^{c g}
- Netelia microdon Townes, 1939^{c g b}
- Netelia microtylus Townes, 1939^{c g b}
- Netelia mirabilis Kaur & Jonathan, 1979^{c g}
- Netelia mombasica (Strand, 1911)^{c g}
- Netelia morleyi Townes, Townes & Gupta, 1962^{c g}
- Netelia moschiana (Strand, 1911)^{c g}
- Netelia mustela Townes, 1939^{c g b}
- Netelia nanutor Aubert & Shaumar, 1978^{c g}
- Netelia natalensis (Cameron, 1911)^{c g}
- Netelia neotropica (Brethes, 1927)^{c g}
- Netelia nigricornis Horstmann, 1981^{c g}
- Netelia nigrinota (Uchida, 1928)^{c g}
- Netelia nigripectus (Ashmead, 1890)^{c g b}
- Netelia nigritarsalis Konishi, 2005^{c g}
- Netelia nigriventris (Brulle, 1846)^{c g}
- Netelia nigroeandis (Cameron, 1911)^{c g}
- Netelia nigrostigma (Strand, 1911)^{c g}
- Netelia nitida Townes, 1939^{c g b}
- Netelia nodulosa (Morley, 1913)^{c g}
- Netelia nomurai Konishi, 2005^{c g}
- Netelia nubigenus (Roman, 1924)^{c}
- Netelia nyassica (Strand, 1911)^{c g}
- Netelia obliquetransversalis (Enderlein, 1912)^{c g}
- Netelia obrepta Townes, 1939^{c g b}
- Netelia ocellaris (Thomson, 1888)^{c g}
- Netelia ocellata (Viereck, 1909)^{c b}
- Netelia ocelliger (Strand, 1915)^{c g}
- Netelia oeceticola (Blanchard, 1941)^{c}
- Netelia oharai Konishi, 2005^{c g}
- Netelia opacula (Thomson, 1888)^{c g}
- Netelia orba Townes, 1939^{c g b}
- Netelia orientalis (Cameron, 1905)^{c g}
- Netelia ovalis Townes, 1939^{c g b}
- Netelia pallens (Cushman, 1924)^{c g b}
- Netelia pallida (Tosquinet, 1896)^{c g}
- Netelia pallidilutea (Strand, 1911)^{c g}
- Netelia palpalis Townes, 1939^{c g b}
- Netelia parca Kaur & Jonathan, 1979^{c g}
- Netelia paramelanura Tolkanitz, 1981^{c g}
- Netelia pardalis (Cushman, 1924)^{c g b}
- Netelia parva (Szépligeti, 1908)^{c}
- Netelia parviareolata (Enderlein, 1912)^{c g}
- Netelia pectinia Kaur & Jonathan, 1979^{c g}
- Netelia pengalengana (Enderlein, 1912)^{c g}
- Netelia percurrens Townes, 1939^{c g b}
- Netelia perforata (Schulz, 1906)^{c g}
- Netelia planipes (Tosquinet, 1896)^{c g}
- Netelia platypes (Cushman, 1930)^{c b}
- Netelia pluridens Townes, 1939^{c g b}
- Netelia praevalvator Delrio, 1971^{c g}
- Netelia producta (Brulle, 1846)^{c g}
- Netelia punctata Townes, 1939^{c g b}
- Netelia radialis (Morley, 1916)^{c g}
- Netelia rapida Tolkanitz, 1981^{c g}
- Netelia recta Townes, 1939^{c g b}
- Netelia rectifascia Townes, 1939^{c g b}
- Netelia rectivena (Enderlein, 1912)^{c g}
- Netelia reflexa Townes, 1939^{c g b}
- Netelia rimosa (Enderlein, 1912)^{c g}
- Netelia rotunda Kaur & Jonathan, 1979^{c g}
- Netelia rufa (Brulle, 1846)^{c}
- Netelia rufescens (Tosquinet, 1896)^{c}
- Netelia rufoculata (Strand, 1911)^{c g}
- Netelia rugosa (Cushman, 1924)^{c}
- Netelia rukmaniae Kaur & Jonathan, 1979^{c g}
- Netelia sayi (Cushman, 1924)^{c g b}
- Netelia scissulata (Enderlein, 1912)^{c g}
- Netelia semenowi (Kokujev, 1899)^{c g}
- Netelia semirufa (Holmgren, 1868)^{c g}
- Netelia setosa Kaur & Jonathan, 1979^{c g}
- Netelia shopar Cheesman, 1953^{c g}
- Netelia silantjewi (Kokujev, 1899)^{c g}
- Netelia siva Kaur & Jonathan, 1979^{c g}
- Netelia solus Townes, 1958^{c g}
- Netelia spinipes (Cushman, 1924)^{c g b}
- Netelia stigmata Townes, 1939^{c g b}
- Netelia striata Nikam, 1973^{c g}
- Netelia strigata (Enderlein, 1912)^{c g}
- Netelia strigilobus Townes, 1939^{c g b}
- Netelia subfusca (Cresson, 1865)^{c}
- Netelia szepligetii (Schulz, 1907)^{c g}
- Netelia takaozana (Uchida, 1928)^{c g}
- Netelia tamis (Cheesman, 1936)^{c g}
- Netelia terebrica Nikam, 1973^{c g}
- Netelia testacea (Gravenhorst, 1829)^{c g}
- Netelia testaceinervis (Cameron, 1912)^{c g}
- Netelia thoracica (Woldstedt, 1880)^{c g}
- Netelia tinctipennis (Cameron, 1886)^{c}
- Netelia togoana (Strand, 1911)^{c g}
- Netelia townesi (Uchida, 1940)^{c b}
- Netelia townsendi (Cushman, 1924)^{c g b}
- Netelia trituberculata (Cushman, 1924)^{c g b}
- Netelia truncativenosa (Enderlein, 1912)^{c g}
- Netelia turbans Townes, 1939^{c g b}
- Netelia umbone Townes, 1939^{c g b}
- Netelia unguicularis (Cushman, 1924)^{c g b}
- Netelia unicolor (Smith, 1874)^{c g}
- Netelia valvator Aubert, 1968
- Netelia vegeta Tolkanitz, 1981^{c g}
- Netelia veronesii Blanchard, 1960^{c g}
- Netelia vinulae (Scopoli, 1763)^{c g}
- Netelia woris (Cheesman, 1936)^{c g}

=== Subgenus Parabates ===
- Netelia foersteri Kaur & Jonathan, 1979^{c g}
- Netelia fusca Konishi, 1985^{c g}
- Netelia fusciapicalis Pham, Chen & Konishi, 2021
- Netelia ishiharai Uchida, 1953^{c g}
- Netelia johnsoni (Ashmead, 1900)^{c g b}
- †Netelia memorialis (Brues, 1910)^{c g}
- Netelia nigricarpa (Thomson, 1888)^{c g}

=== Subgenus Paropheltes ===
- Netelia albipicta (Tosquinet, 1896)^{c}
- Netelia alaskensis (Ashmead, 1902)^{c g b}
- Netelia albovariegata (Provancher, 1874)^{c g b}
- Netelia arabator Delrio, 1971^{c g}
- Netelia arcanus Tolkanitz, 1980^{c g}
- Netelia barberi (Cushman, 1924)^{c g b}
- Netelia basilewskyi Benoit, 1955^{c g}
- Netelia beschkovi Kolarov, 1994^{c g}
- Netelia caucasica (Kokujev, 1899)^{c g}
- Netelia ciliata Townes, 1939^{c g b}
- Netelia contiguator Delrio, 1975^{c g}
- Netelia decorator (Seyrig, 1927)^{c g}
- Netelia dhruvi Kaur & Jonathan, 1979^{c g}
- Netelia elegans (Szepligeti, 1905)^{c g}
- Netelia elevator Aubert, 1971^{c g}
- Netelia ermolenkoi Tolkanitz, 1981^{c g}
- Netelia flavolineata (Cameron, 1907)^{c}
- Netelia fulginosa Konishi, 1996^{c g}
- Netelia guptai Kaur & Jonathan, 1979^{c g}
- Netelia hottentota (Strand, 1911)^{c g}
- Netelia incognitor Delrio, 1971^{c g}
- Netelia inedita (Kokujev, 1899)
- Netelia interstitinervis (Strand, 1911)^{c g}
- Netelia laticeps Townes, 1939^{c g b}
- Netelia lineolata (Costa, 1883)^{c g}
- Netelia longipes (Brauns, 1889)^{c g}
- Netelia macroglossa Townes, 1939^{c g b}
- Netelia maculiventris (Kokujev, 1915)^{c g}
- Netelia millieratae (Kriechbaumer, 1897)^{c g}
- Netelia nervulator Aubert, 1971^{c g}
- Netelia nomas (Kokujev, 1899)^{c g}
- Netelia novoguineensis (Szepligeti, 1906)^{c}
- Netelia ornata (Vollenhoven, 1873)^{c g}
- Netelia parvula (Meyer, 1927)^{c}
- Netelia pharaonum (Schmiedeknecht, 1910)^{c g}
- Netelia picta Townes, 1939^{c g b}
- Netelia radiata Townes, 1939^{c g b}
- Netelia rimata Townes, 1939^{c g b}
- Netelia savchenkoi Tolkanitz, 1981^{c g}
- Netelia serrata Townes, 1939^{c g b}
- Netelia sikkimensis Kaur & Jonathan, 1979^{c g}
- Netelia strigosa Konishi, 1996^{c g}
- Netelia tarsata (Brischke, 1880)^{c g b}
- Netelia terebrator (Ulbricht, 1922)^{c g}
- Netelia thomsonii (Brauns, 1889)^{c g}
- Netelia turanica (Kokujev, 1899)^{c g}
- Netelia yui Konishi, 2000^{c g}
- Netelia zaydamensis (Kokujev, 1915)^{c}

=== Subgenus Prosthodocis ===
- Netelia aestiva Konishi, 1991^{c g}
- Netelia antefurcalis (Szépligeti, 1908)^{c g}
- Netelia australis Konishi, 1991^{c g}
- Netelia baibarensis (Uchida, 1928)^{c}
- Netelia borealis Konishi, 1991^{c g}
- Netelia exserta (Cushman, 1924)^{c g b}
- Netelia hikosana Konishi, 1991^{c g}
- Netelia japonica (Uchida, 1928)^{c g}
- Netelia kodai Konishi, 1991^{c g}
- Netelia major Konishi, 1991^{c g}
- Netelia scabiosa (Enderlein, 1912)^{c g}
- Netelia sobaekensis Lee & Cha, 1996^{c g}
- Netelia uchidai Kaur & Jonathan, 1979^{c g}
- Netelia whymperi (Cameron, 1903)^{c g}

=== Subgenus Protonetelia ===
- Netelia hirashimai Konishi, 1986^{c g}
- Netelia tadauchii Konishi, 2012

=== Subgenus Toxochiloides ===
- Netelia hayashii Konishi, 1996^{c g}
- Netelia krishtali Tolkanitz, 1971^{c g}
- Netelia latro (Holmgren, 1868)^{c g}
- Netelia punctator Delrio, 1971^{c g}
- Netelia tunetana (Habermehl, 1923)^{c}

=== Subgenus Toxochilus ===
- Netelia caviverticalis (Cushman, 1924)^{c g b}
- Netelia clypeata (Cushman, 1924)^{c b}
- Netelia glabra Townes, 1939^{c g b}
- Netelia magniceps Townes, 1939^{c g b}
- Netelia mystace Townes, 1939^{c g b}
- Netelia pulchra (Cushman, 1924)^{c b}
- Netelia ultima Townes, 1939^{c g b}

Data sources: i = ITIS, c = Catalogue of Life, g = GBIF, b = Bugguide.net
