= Hercus =

Hercus is a Scottish surname. The name derives from "harecarres", a Border name for a boundary marker made of rock. Although this medieval place name has been found in three other sites in south-east Scotland, the six modern variations of the surname – Hercus, Herkes, Harcus, Harkes, Harkess and Arcus come from the fourth medieval site today called Harcarse, in the parish of Fogo, Berwickshire, Scotland.

The first recorded spelling of the family name is shown to be that of Adam de Harcarres, who in 1216, was elected Abbot of Newbattle and subsequently Abbot of Melrose. Alexander of Harcarse, knight, performed fealty to Edward I, king of England in 1297 and the arms of Harcarse of that Ilk [of Harcarse], are cited in the Scottish Arms 1370–1678.

The name Hercas first appears in the Orkney Islands in the 1500s. Harcus is "the present Orkney spelling of Harcarse" according to George F. Black in "The Surnames of Scotland". The names of Robert, Johnne, and George Hercas are named in the Respite of 1539 for complicity in connection with the Battle of Summerdale, 1529. The naming of three Hercas out of a total of thirty one, is indicative of the relative importance of the family at that time in Orkney.

On 5 August 2011, a gathering of Hercus/Harcus and related surnames was held at The Lodge, Carfraemill, Lauder, Berwickshire, TD2 6RA, Scotland with attendees from Australia, Canada, England, New Zealand, Scotland, Spain, and the USA. At this gathering, the Flower of Scotland tartan was adopted as the Hercus tartan as no tartan was previously associated with this family name.

== Notable people with the surname include ==
- Mike Hercus, American rugby player
- Philip Hercus, Australian naval architect and marine vessel designer
- Luise Hercus, Linguist expert on Australian languages
- Ann Hercus, New Zealand politician
- Charles Hercus, New Zealand doctor and professor of public health

== See also ==
- Kamen Rider Hercus, a character from Kamen Rider Kabuto
- Hercus (wasp), an ichneumon wasp.
- Herkus Monte, Prussian military leader
