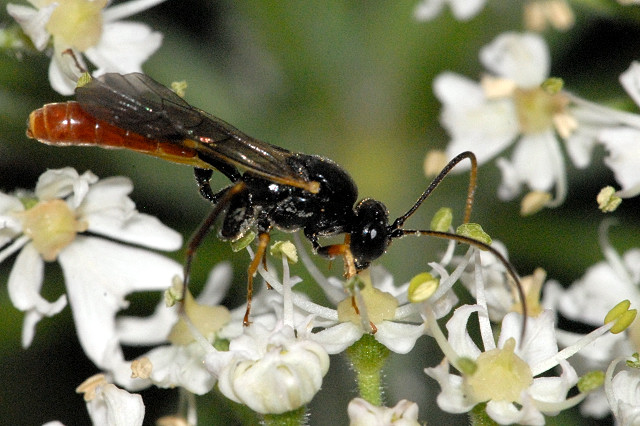
- Tryphon rutilator

Scientific classification
- Kingdom: Animalia
- Phylum: Arthropoda
- Clade: Pancrustacea
- Class: Insecta
- Order: Hymenoptera
- Family: Ichneumonidae
- Subfamily: Tryphoninae; Shuckard, 1840

= Tryphoninae =

Subfamily of wasps

The Tryphoninae comprise a worldwide subfamily of the parasitic wasp family Ichneumonidae.

== Behavior ==
Most species of the Tryphoninae are koinobiont ectoparasitoids of Symphyta larvae, but members of some genera (e.g. Netelia) are ectoparasitoids of Lepidoptera larvae. Tryphonines have a hair-margined clypeus and two longitudinal parallel ridges occur on the first tergite. The female sometimes has stalked eggs projecting from her ovipositor.

== Distribution ==
The family Tryphoninae is cosmopolitan with the greatest biodiversity in the Holarctic.

== Tribes and genera ==
As of 2024, the following eight tribes are recognized. Fifty-five extant genera are described as well as at least 3 extinct genera.

=== Tribe Ankylophonini Gauld, 1984 ===
- Ankylophon Gauld, 1984

=== Tribe Eclytini Townes & Townes, 1945 ===
- Eclytus Holmgren, 1857

=== Tribe Exenterini Förster, 1869 ===
- Acrotomus Holmgren, 1857
- Cteniscus Haliday, 1832
- Cycasis Townes, 1965
- Eremodolius Kasparyan, 1985
- Eridolius Förster, 1869
- Excavarus Davis, 1897
- Exenterus Hartig, 1837
- Exyston Schiødte, 1839
- Kerrichia Mason, 1962
- Kristotomus Mason, 1962
- Orthodolius Kasparyan, 2024
- Orthomiscus Mason, 1955
- Scapnetes Townes, 1969
- Schelocentrus Kasparyan, 1976
- Smicroplectrus Thomson, 1883

=== Tribe Idiogrammatini Cushman, 1942 ===
- Idiogramma Förster, 1869
- †Urotryphon Townes 1973

=== Tribe Oedemopsini Woldstedt, 1877 ===
- Acaenitellus Morley
- Atopotrophos Cushman
- Cladeutes Townes, 1969
- Debophanes Gauld
- Hercus Townes, 1969
- Leptixys Townes, 1969
- Neliopisthus Thomson, 1883
- Oedemopsis Tschek, 1869
- Scudderopsis Bennett
- †Thymariodes Kasparyan, 1988
- Thymaris Forster, 1869
- Zagryphus Cushman

=== Tribe Phytodietini Hellén, 1915 ===
- †Biamosa Khalaim
- Brevitubulus Wang, 1987
- Netelia Gray, 1860
- Phytodietus Gravenhorst, 1829

=== Tribe Sphinctini Förster, 1869 ===
- Sphinctus Gravenhorst, 1829

=== Tribe Tryphonini Shuckard, 1840 ===
- Aridella Kasparyan, 1970
- Boethella Bennett, 2003
- Boethus Forster, 1869
- Chiloplatys Townes & Townes, 1945
- Cosmoconus Forster, 1869
- Ctenochira Forster, 1855
- Dyspetes Forster, 1869
- Erromenus Holmgren, 1857
- Grypocentrus Ruthe, 1855
- Ibornia Seyrig, 1936
- Lagoleptus Townes, 1969
- Ledora Kasparya, 1983
- Leviculus Townes, 1969
- Megatryphon Cockerell, 1924
- Monoblastus Hartig, 1837
- Neleges Forster, 1869
- Otoblastus Förster, 1869
- Parablastus Constantineanu, 1973
- Polyblastus Hartig, 1837
- Thibetoides Davis, 1879
- Tryphon Fallén, 1813
- Zambion Kasparyan, 1993

== Gallery ==
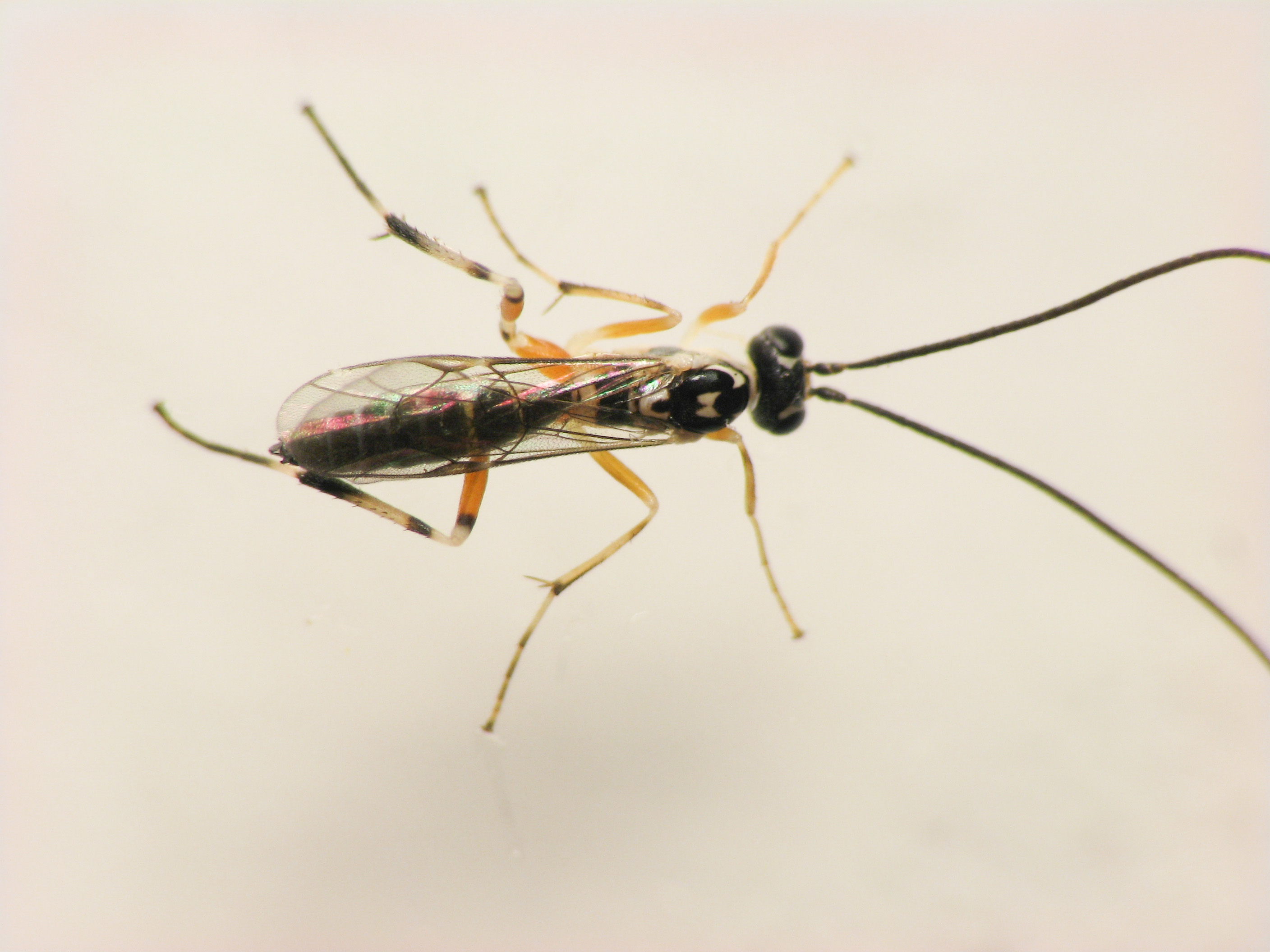
Phytodietus sp. male (Tribe Phytodietini)

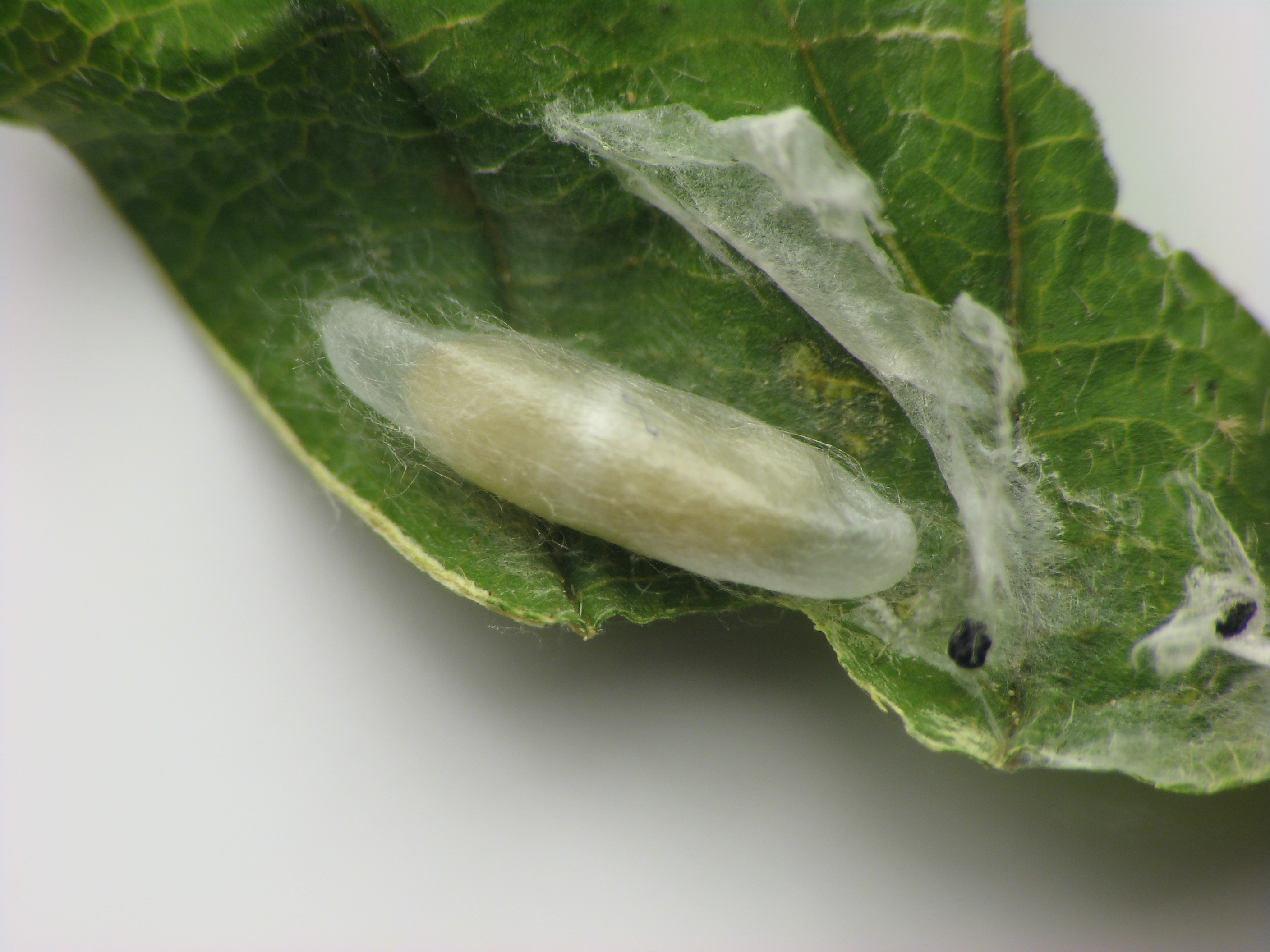
Phytodietus sp. pupa

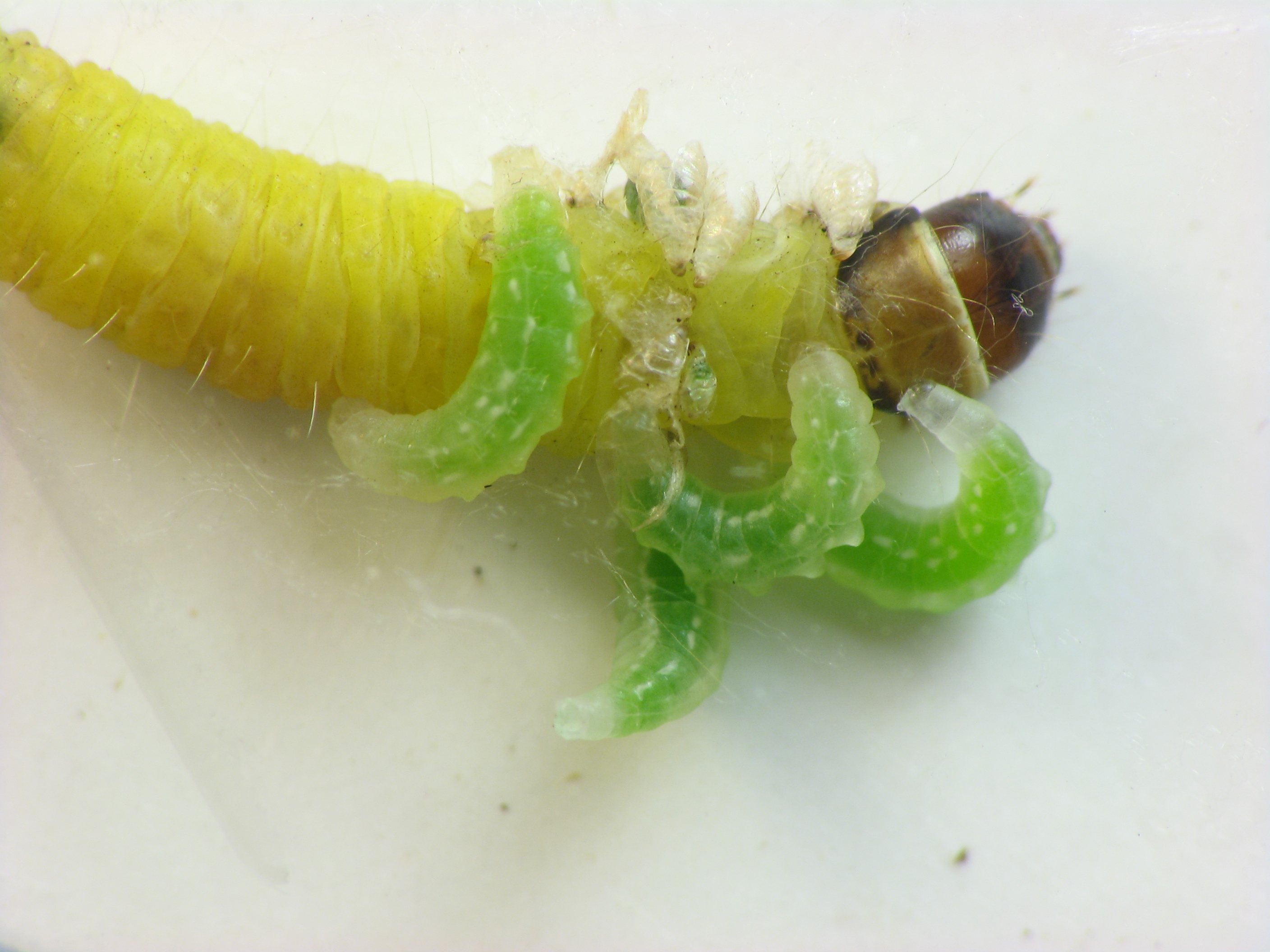
Hercus fontinalis late instar larvae (tribe Oedemopsini)
