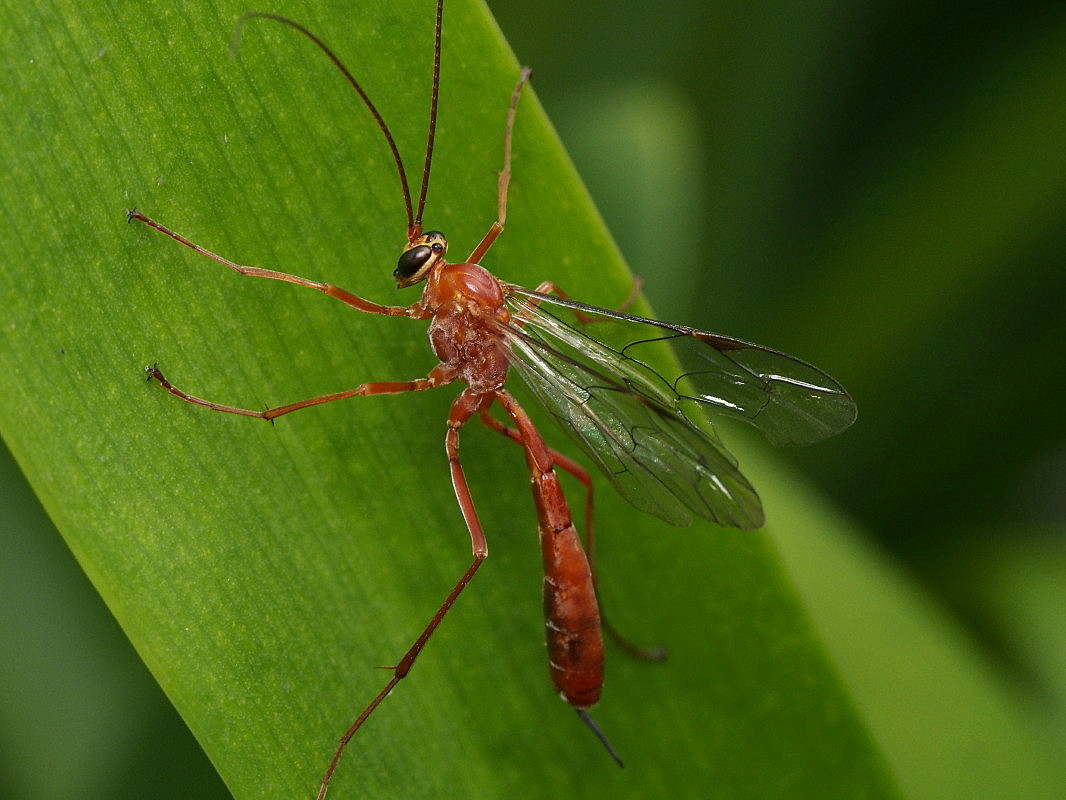

Scientific classification
- Domain: Eukaryota
- Kingdom: Animalia
- Phylum: Arthropoda
- Class: Insecta
- Order: Hymenoptera
- Family: Ichneumonidae
- Subfamily: Tryphoninae
- Tribe: Phytodietini
- Genus: Netelia
- Species: N. producta

Binomial name
- Netelia producta Brullé, 1846

Synonyms
- Netelia foveata Cameron 1898

= Netelia producta =

Species of wasp

Netelia producta is a species of ichneumonid wasp in the subfamily Tryphoninae found in Australia.

== Description and identification ==
N. producta is one of about 9 described species and 11 undescribed species in its genus found in Australia. It is uniformly orange-brown in color like most members of the genus, and separation from its allies can only be reliably done by inspection of male genitalia with respect to a structure on the clasper.

== Distribution ==
N. producta is endemic to Australia.

== Life cycle ==
Netelia producta is a koinobiont larval parasitoid of caterpillars in the family Noctuidae. Among these hosts is the genus Helicoverpa, including Helicoverpa armigera, which is a pest of crops including tomatoes.

The female envenomates the host caterpillar to paralyze it and lays an egg behind the head capsule. After the egg hatches, the larva feeds on its host as the host develops. The larva later emerges once the host becomes a prepupa, which kills the host. The larva then spins its own black-colored cocoon out of silk and pupates in the subterranean pupation chamber created by its host.
