= Exenterus =

Scientific classification
- Domain: Eukaryota
- Kingdom: Animalia
- Phylum: Arthropoda
- Class: Insecta
- Order: Hymenoptera
- Family: Ichneumonidae
- Subfamily: Tryphoninae
- Tribe: Exenterini
- Genus: Exenterus; Hartig, 1837

Extant species
- Exenterus abruptorius; Exenterus amictorius; Exenterus canadensis; Exenterus confusus; Exenterus walleyi; Exenterus tsugae; Exenterus platypes; Exenterus pini; Exenterus nigrifrons; Exenterus affinis

Genus of wasps

Exenterus is a genus of wasps belonging to the family Ichneumonidae.

The genus was first described by Hartig in 1837.

The species of this genus are found in Eurasia and North America. It is parasitic on Diprionidae sawflies.

Species:

- Exenterus abruptorius
- Exenterus amictorius
- Exenterus canadensis
- Exenterus confusus
- Exenterus walleyi
- Exenterus tsugae
- Exenterus platypes
- Exenterus pini
- Exenterus nigrifrons
- Exenterus affinis
