= Cairn's Mill =

Group of listed buildings in Fogo, Scotland

Cairn's Mill: Cairnsmill
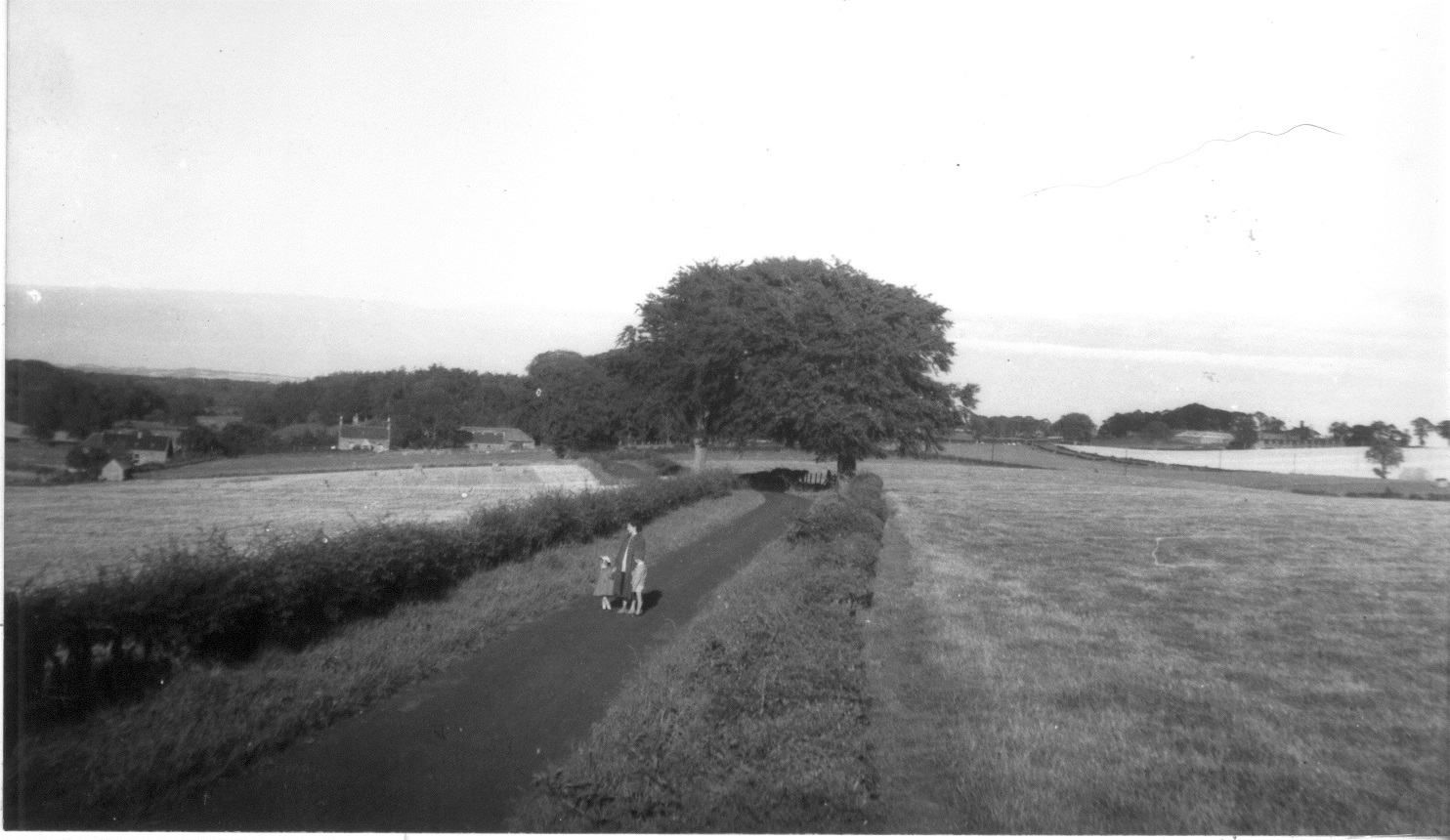
- Cairn's Mill - mill, cottage, and steadings - seen from Fogo road in autumn 1959

- Location within the Scottish Borders
- OS grid reference: NT7849
- Civil parish: Fogo
- Council area: Scottish Borders
- Lieutenancy area: Berwickshire
- Country: Scotland
- Sovereign state: United Kingdom
- Post town: Duns
- Postcode district: TD11
- Dialling code: 01360
- Police: Scotland
- Fire: Scottish
- Ambulance: Scottish
- UK Parliament: Berwickshire, Roxburgh and Selkirk
- Scottish Parliament: Ettrick, Roxburgh and Berwickshire

Cairn's Mill consists of a group of buildings close to the Blackadder Water in the parish of Fogo, county of Berwickshire, Borders of Scotland. It is situated at the geographical coordinates: 55°44′13″N 2°19′44″W.

The presence of a mill at this site is indicated on a map from 1654, which covers the historic region within the Scottish Borders known as the Merse, but the first inhabitant Jasper Cairns was recorded somewhat earlier on 28 Oct. 1591 as 'in the [millstead} Bogend-mylne, par[ish] of Fogo in the Merse'. The explicit declaration as Bogend Mill shows the close relationship between Bogend Farm and the Mill before the mill's designation at some later date was adjusted to Cairn's Mill.

All buildings within this settlement are registered as Category C listed buildings, which includes both the cottage and the steadings on the hillside and the mill down in the Blackadder Water valley, adjacent to the mill race. All these buildings were erected between the late 18th and mid 19th century, with some later additions. According to the oldest inhabitant's memories the mill was still in use in the late 1960s.

The only access route is via a single-track road that to the west follows the ridge (Scottish "rig") parallel to the Blackadder Water and leads to the village of Fogo, just over a mile away; and to the east roughly half a mile along a rather convoluted route around, most probably ancient, field boundaries to Bogend Farm.

== Listed buildings ==
These three buildings are registered as "listed buildings" under the Planning (Listing Buildings and Conservation Areas) (Scotland) Act of 1997. The whole ensemble is registered by the label "LB45764".

=== Cairn's Mill ===
Cairn's Mill is the first of a series of mills downriver from Fogo, at the foot of the southern slope of the Blackadder Water's narrow valley, ajacent to the mill race (mill lade on Ordnance Survey maps for Scotland). As a person named Jasper Cairns is documented as "in the Bogend-mylne" in proceedings dated 1591, the original Mill, a cornmill, must have been erected and in regular use well before that decade.

No date is given for the current two-storeyed building, but it is clearly depicted on Andrew Armstrong's map of 1771 together with a building uphill to the south. This implies that at least one of the hillside structures is of similar age; most probably Cairn's Mill cottage, but it cannot be ruled out that that structure may be the first part of the later extended steadings.

The walls of the mill are constructed of rubble masonry, surely erected on the site of a previous structure; roofing material is mostly corrugated iron except for the slate-covered kiln to the north. All original machinery has been removed from the interior of the mill. At some date a sawmill was attached and the corrugated iron roofing of the eastern side of the building was correspondingly extended.

=== Cairn's Mill cottage ===
Cairn's Mill cottage resides on the hillside about 6 metres north of the steadings, the garden behind sloping towards the mill below. The original, much smaller cottage may date back to the 18th century. Most additions and alterations had occurred by the mid 19th century, some more in the following decades. The current cottage is L-shaped, with the older section to the west, to which an upper storey was added.The eastern section is of a later date. A gabled porch in the middle of the west front serves as the main entrance, the eastern structure's south-facing door serves as side entrance.

=== Cairn's Mill steadings ===
The Cairn's Mill steadings are laid out in a rectangular form. The oldest parts probably date back to the 18th century. Three sections (west, north, east) connect to form a courtyard open to the south. A description from the year 1998 mentions a rubble wall enclosing the southern end of the courtyard.

== Other notable structures and places of interest ==
The millside cottages are not included as listed buildings, but deserve mention as they were a long-time inhabited and vital part of Cairn's Mill everyday workings.

=== Millside cottages ===
At some date between 1864 and 1899 two adjacent single-storey cottages were erected on the valley floor a few yards to the west of the mill. They are first depicted on an 1899 Ordnance Survey map, but do not appear on any earlier versions. They were still included on the 1974 Ordnance Survey map, but must have been torn down before 1998 as they were not included in the 1998 survey of Listed Buildings in Scotland and are completely missing on modern maps of the area. At some date a massive, long stone wall topped by an earthen dyke was erected on the southern bank of the river bend to protect both cottages and mill from the floodwaters of the Blackadder Water. (Note: No further official information exists about the millside cottages but one of the last inhabitants described the devastating flood of 1948 as "My husband and I retreated to the rafters and observed the pots and pans rising in the floodwaters of the Blackadder and being swept out of the door. Soon after the flood had subsided we were all able to move to one of the Bogend cottages.". The two cottages were later refitted with breeding pens for piglets.)

=== The haugh ===
This is a fine example of an old Scottish landscape term that has survived to this day. The luscious riverside meadows left and right of the Blackadder Water were referred to by the locals as "The Haugh". The term "haugh" (Note: Haugh: also hauch, hawch, (h)auche, haughe, haucht, hawcht, hawh-, hawgh. An old Scottish term for a low-lying meadow by the side of a river.) is an old Scottish term for a low-lying meadow by the side of a river. It was also used in a deed that donated the whole parish of Fogo, including all meadows south of the Blackadder Water and thus the site of Cairn's Mill, to Kelso Abbey in 1211 (refer to Fogo, Scottish Borders#Donation of lands adjacent to Fogo, 1211 (Kel. Lib., no. 303)).

=== The cutting / ice-age drumlins ===
The lowest fields between Bogend and Cairn's Mill must previously have been soggy and waterlogged as it had deemed necessary to cut a very deep ditch into the hill (Scottish: rig) bordering and thus also guiding the Blackadder on the south, the very hill that Cairn's Mill cottage and steadings stand upon. This narrow cutting, some 200 metres to the east of the mill, is roughly 10-12 meters deep and, right down to the deepest layer, shows no bedrock. The explanation is that the rig, which extends from Fogorig on the west, underlying Cairn's Mill, and continuing further narrowing to the east, consists completely of ice-age deposits; till, clay, stones, and boulders. Such an elongated and narrow deposit is named a drumlin. The closest drumlin to the south is the "Green Rig", the closest north rises almost vertically where undercut by the northern bends of the Blackadder. Geographical studies of southern Scotland reveal that most of the Tweed valley, i.e. the Merse, has been shaped by huge glaciers flowing from the southwest to the northeast out into the area that is now the North Sea, forming and aligning the major topographical features likewise from SE to NW. After the glaciers receded the valleys between these parallel drumlins determined the course of most brooks and rivers, including the Blackadder Water.

== History ==
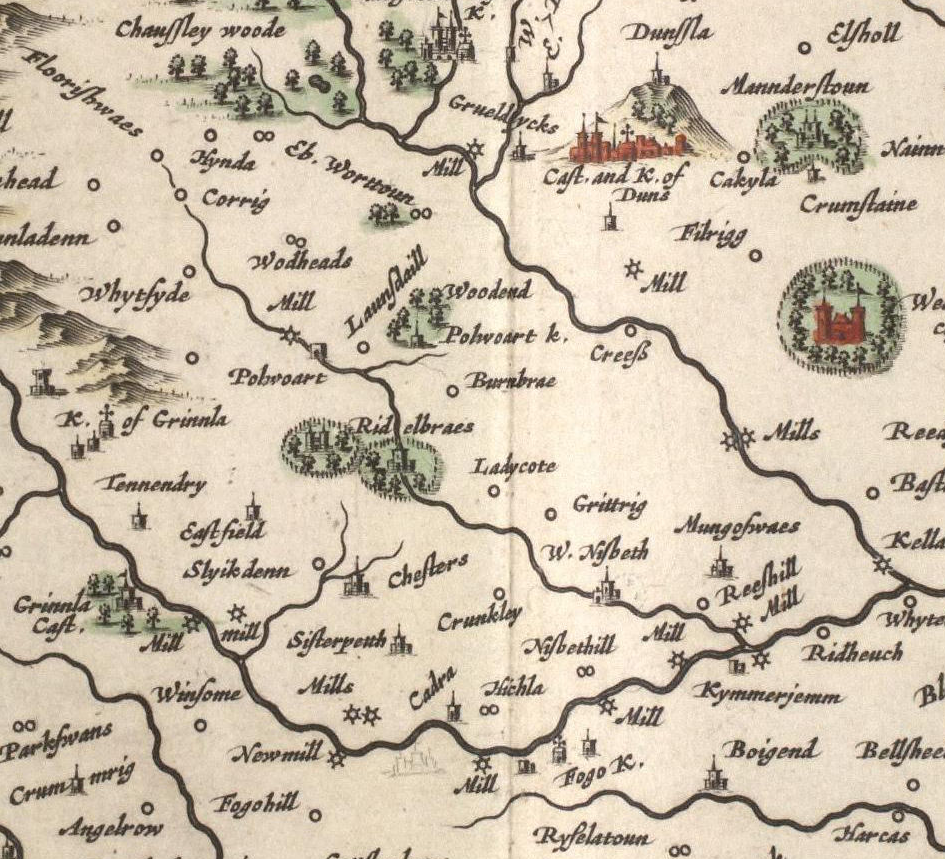
Detail extracted from the original map of the Merse by Joan Blaeu, printed 1654. Cairn's Mill is situated at the first water wheel symbol downriver from Fogo K(irk), close to the lower edge of this image >> Click here to refer to map with annotations which indicate various locations, including the modern names of all mills situated on the Blackadder Water and its tributaries.

Cairn's Mill lies within the precincts of Fogo parish, the boundaries of which are first described in a 1211 deed granting the whole area of the parish to the Tironensian monks of Kelso Abbey. In the following centuries in Fogo parish alone four more mills were erected along the Blackadder Water, three upriver and one downriver from Fogo Mill (as indicated on Joan Blaeu's map of the Merse at right), and that downriver was the site of the so called Bogend Mylne, the precursor of Cairn's Mill, always having been closely associated with the Boigend (Bogend) farm.

=== Rough wooing (1545) ===
In 1545 an English force invaded the Merse, one of a series of incursions known as the Rough Wooing.
On Sunday, 20th of September 1545, coming from Kelso, the commanding Earl of Hertford razed first Coldstream, then marched through the parish of Fogga (Fogo), burning every farmstead, mill, manse, and kirk on the way; thereupon he camped overnight in the vicinity of Fogo and subsequently proceeded to burn down both town and castle of Duns and to devastate all of Duns parish before returning to England via Ladykirk. The Earl compiled an account of his campaign together with a list of 'THE NAMES OF THE FORTRESSES, ABBEYS, FRERE-HOUSES, MARKET TOWNES, VILLAGES, TOWRES AND PLACES burnt, razed and, and cast down'. Although neither the Bogend Mylne nor Bogend are included in this list, they both reside close to the road leading from Fogo to Ryslaw, both of which are expressly mentioned, and thus were surely affected and most likely likewise devastated.

=== Jasper Cairns in the Bogend-mylne (1591 and 1603) ===
The site of the rebuilt(?) mill was first recorded some 40 years later on 28 Oct. 1591 in "THE COMMISSARIOT RECORD OF EDINBURGH. REGISTER OF TESTAMENTS. 1514-1600" in a testament given by a man named Jasper Cairns, here of the Bogend-mylne. The current official designation Cairn's Mill is obviously derived from the surname of its historical operator, presumably the head miller. At which point in time Cairns' name replaced the original term Bogend as designation for this mill is unknown.
Excerpt from page 45 of the above mentioned document:

Cairns (Cairnes), Jasper, in the Bogend-mylne, par[ish] of Fogo in the Merse - 28 Oct. 1591 and 21 Feb. 1603 (Note: Entry on page 45 of "THE COMMISSARIOT RECORD OF EDINBURGH. REGISTER OF TESTAMENTS. 1514-1600": Cairns, Jasper, in the Bogend-mylne, parish of Fogo in the Merse - 28 Oct. 1591 and 21 Feb. 1603)

Page 45 also states that almost a decade earlier Jasper Cairns had operated the Nisbet Mill, the next mill site downriver, together with his 'sometime spouse' Bessi Watson, her testament having been recorded even earlier, on 16 May 1582. As the above stated testament of 1591 was important enough to also be recorded by the authorities in Edinburgh this act may indicate that he took over responsibility for the nearby upriver Bogend-mylne and thus most probably relocated to there:

Cairns (Cairnes), Jasper, in Neisbet-mylne. See Watson, Bessie. (Note: Entry on page 45 of "THE COMMISSARIOT RECORD OF EDINBURGH. REGISTER OF TESTAMENTS. 1514-1600": 'Cairns (Cairnes), Jasper, in Neisbet-mylne. See Watson, Bessie)
... Watson, Bessie, sometime spouse to Jasper Cairns, in Neisbet-mylne in the Merse - 16 May 1582 (Note: Entry on page 285 of "THE COMMISSARIOT RECORD OF EDINBURGH. REGISTER OF TESTAMENTS. 1514-1600": Watson, Bessie, sometime spouse to Jasper Cairns, in Neisbet-mylne in the Merse - 16 May 1582)

The millstead Bogend-mylne is also mentioned two years later on page 167, here referring to a man of unknown occupation, named John Swinton:

Swinton, John, in the Bogend-mylne, par[ish] of Fogo in the Merse - 10 Nov. 1593 (Note: Entry on page 167 of "THE COMMISSARIOT RECORD OF EDINBURGH. REGISTER OF TESTAMENTS. 1514-1600": Swinton, John, in the Bogend-mylne, parish of Fogo in the Merse - 10 Nov. 1593)

=== Map of the Merse (1654) ===
It took more than half a century before Cairn's Mill was cartographically registered; as an unnamed water wheel symbol close to the Blackadder Water on Joan Blaeu's 1654 map of the Merse. It is one of a whole series of mills spaced along the Blackadder river.

=== Alterations and extensions of the buildings (since 1771) ===
Alterations and extensions of the buildings may be traced since 1771. The most significant alterations are the enlargement of the hillside cottage, the continual development of the steadings, and the addition of a cottage (now demolished) in the valley at the foot of the steep downhill track leading to the mill.

== Historic Valuation / tithes / rentals ==
Until the reformation in Scotland took hold every farmstead, mill, or manse in a parish was obliged to pay tithes or rentals to the church. There are no records for the valuation of either Bogend-mylne or Cairn's Mill, but a rough estimation may be derived from other sites within the parish of Fogo.

Annual payment for Bogend, as stated on various documents compiled at the Abbey of Kelso, all dated c. 1567; surely including the Bogend Mill:

Annual "RENTALL OF THE ABBACIE" (Kelso Abbey), section "THE KIRKIS THAT PAIS VITTALL", Charta de Calchou, page 504:
According to a trade dictionary of 1863: 1 boll(is) of barley weighed 320 pounds; 1 boll(is) of oats 264 pounds; 1 chauldron = 16 bolls.

Bogend: In wheat 2 bollis, in barley 10 bo[llis], in oats 1 ch[auldron] 4 bo[llis] - summa 2 ch[auldrons] (Note: These are Scottish dry volume measures that were slightly different for various types of grain, but often bore the same name. * chalder (chauder) equal to 16 bolls * boll (bowe, or bole) equal to 4 firlots. Weight equivalents of one boll are given in a trade dictionary of 1863 as follows: Barley 320 pounds; Oats 264 pounds; Oatmeal 140 pounds.)

Annual "RENTALL OF THE ABBACIE" (Kelso Abbey), Charta de Calchou, page 491:

Item the kirk land of Fogo called Gey rig (Fogorig): 20s [equal to: [£1]
Item the mylne of fogo: £4

Annual rentals to the Abbey of Kelso, Book of Assumptions, page 231:

The Bogend: 53s 4p [equal to: [£2 13s 4 p]
The Mylne of Fogo: £4

== List of owners ==
Five owners / operators / millers of Cairn's Mill are documented:

- Jasper Cairns, miller or operator of the mill in 1591.
- D. M. Robertson Esq., owner of the estate in 1840.
- Richard Trotter esq. is registered as subsequent proprietor of Cairn's Mill until he sold the property sometime before 1866.
- George Sanderson is mentioned in 1866 as 'farmer at Cairnsmill'.
- The Calder family purchased Bogend Farm and Cairn's Mill before 1932 (mentioned as "Messrs. Calder of Bogend" in chapter "MILK GRADING" of the 1932 Report by Berwickshire (Scotland) County Council).

== Maps of Cairn's Mill ==
The following links lead to maps with annotations that display various stages of the development of Cairn's Mill and surroundings:

- Map by Andrew Armstrong, 1771
- A 1840 map stating that Cairn's Mill belongs to the property of D. M. Robertson Esq.
- The first Ordnance Survey map published in 1862
- The revised Ordnance Survey map published in 1908
- Further Ordnance Survey revisions and updates are available till mid-20th century
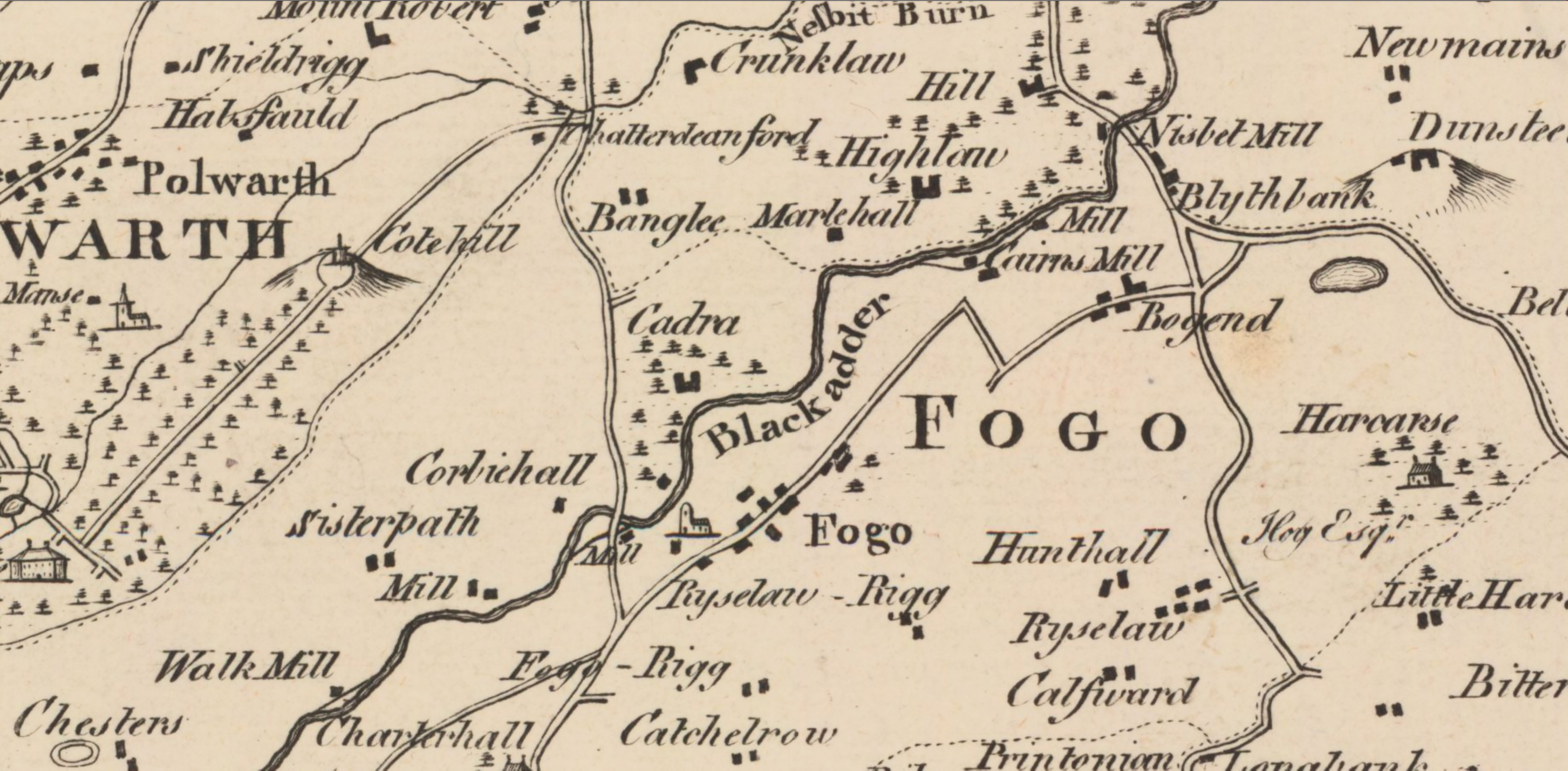
Map by Andrew Armstrong, 1771, County of Berwick SE section; focus on Fogo parish

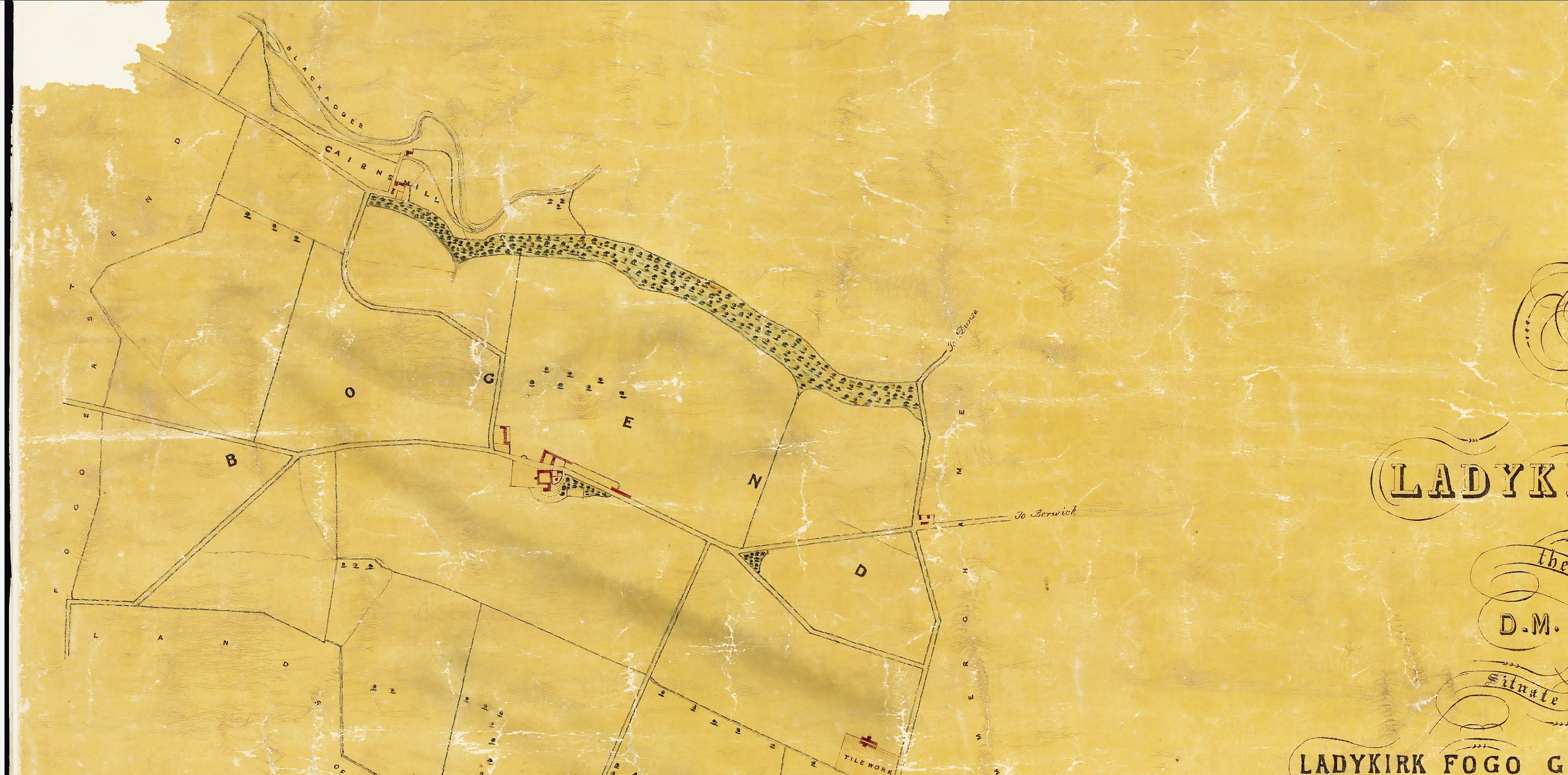
Map of the property of D.M.Robertson, surveyed 1830 and 1840; section Cairn's Mill and Bogend (rotate anticlockwise by exactly 45° to align to true north)

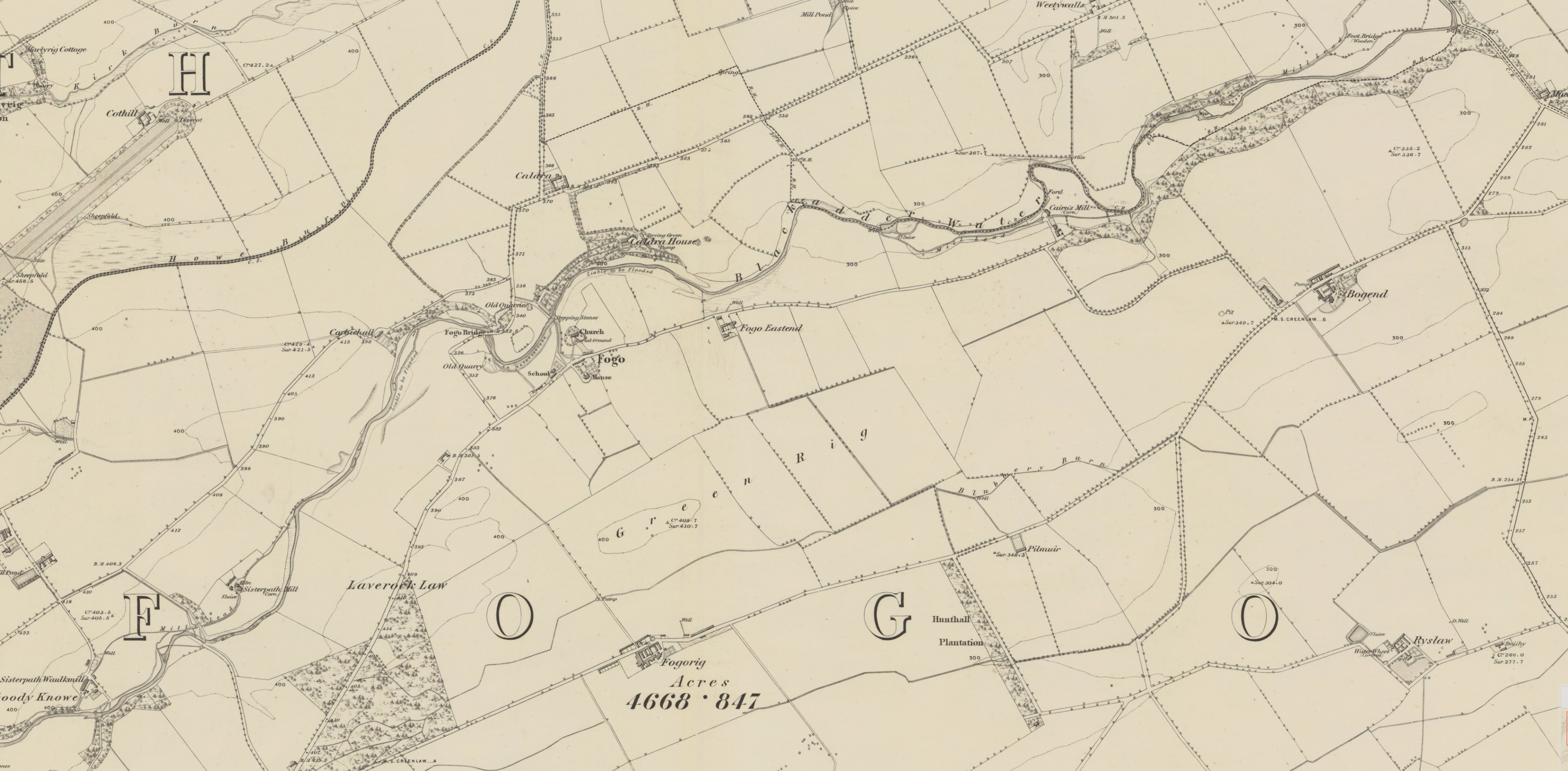
Ordnance Survey map of Berwickshire, Sheet XXII, surveyed 1858, published 1862; focus on Fogo parish

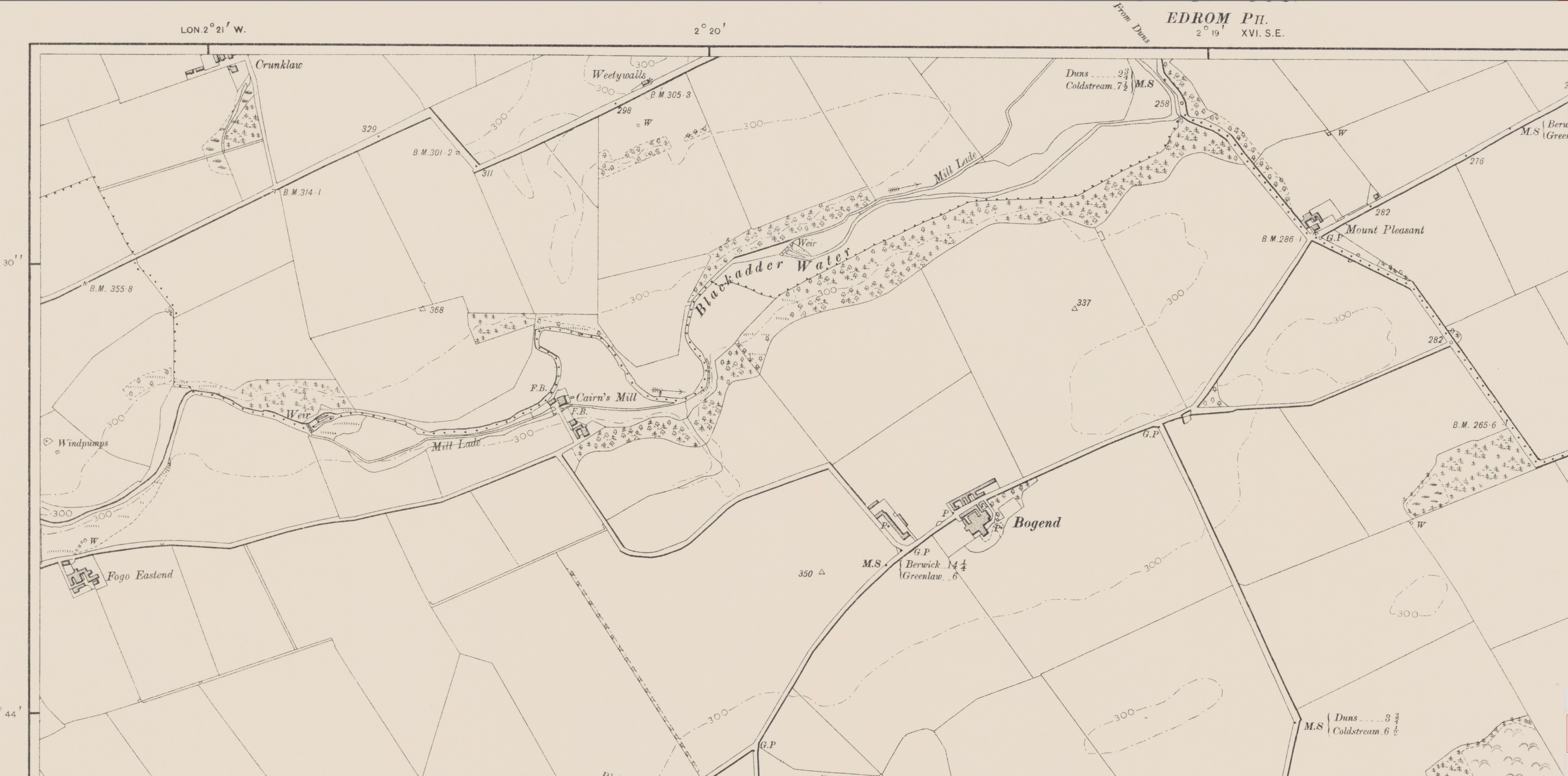
Ordnance Survey map of Berwickshire, XXII.NE, published 1908; focus on Fogo parish

== Nearby places ==
Other places nearby include Bogend farmstead, Fogo, Fogo Mains (farmstead, earlier Fogo Eastend), Fogorig (farmstead), Ryslaw (farmstead), Harcarse (farmstead), Caldra (farmstead), Sisterpath (farmstead), Charterhall (manse), Charterhall airfield, Gavinton, the Greenknowe Tower, Greenlaw, Duns, Polwarth.

== See also ==
- List of listed buildings in Fogo, Scottish Borders
- List of places in the Scottish Borders
- List of places in Scotland

== Image gallery ==
Note: images of the mill are not in the public domain, but are available at one of these external links.

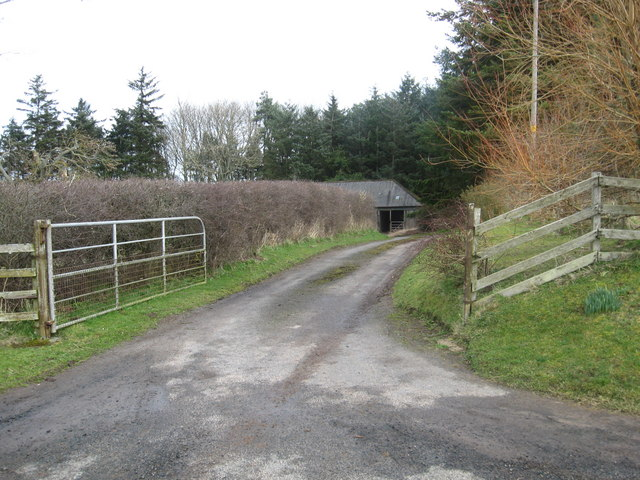
Gate and track leading to Cairn's Mill, southern end of the steadings visible

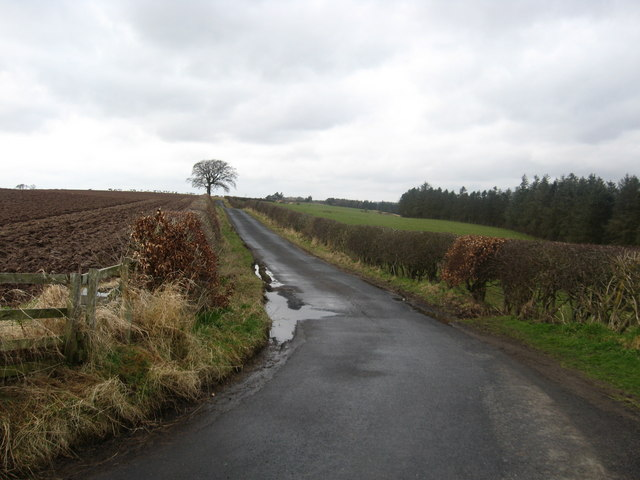
Road leading away from Cairn's Mill towards Fogo

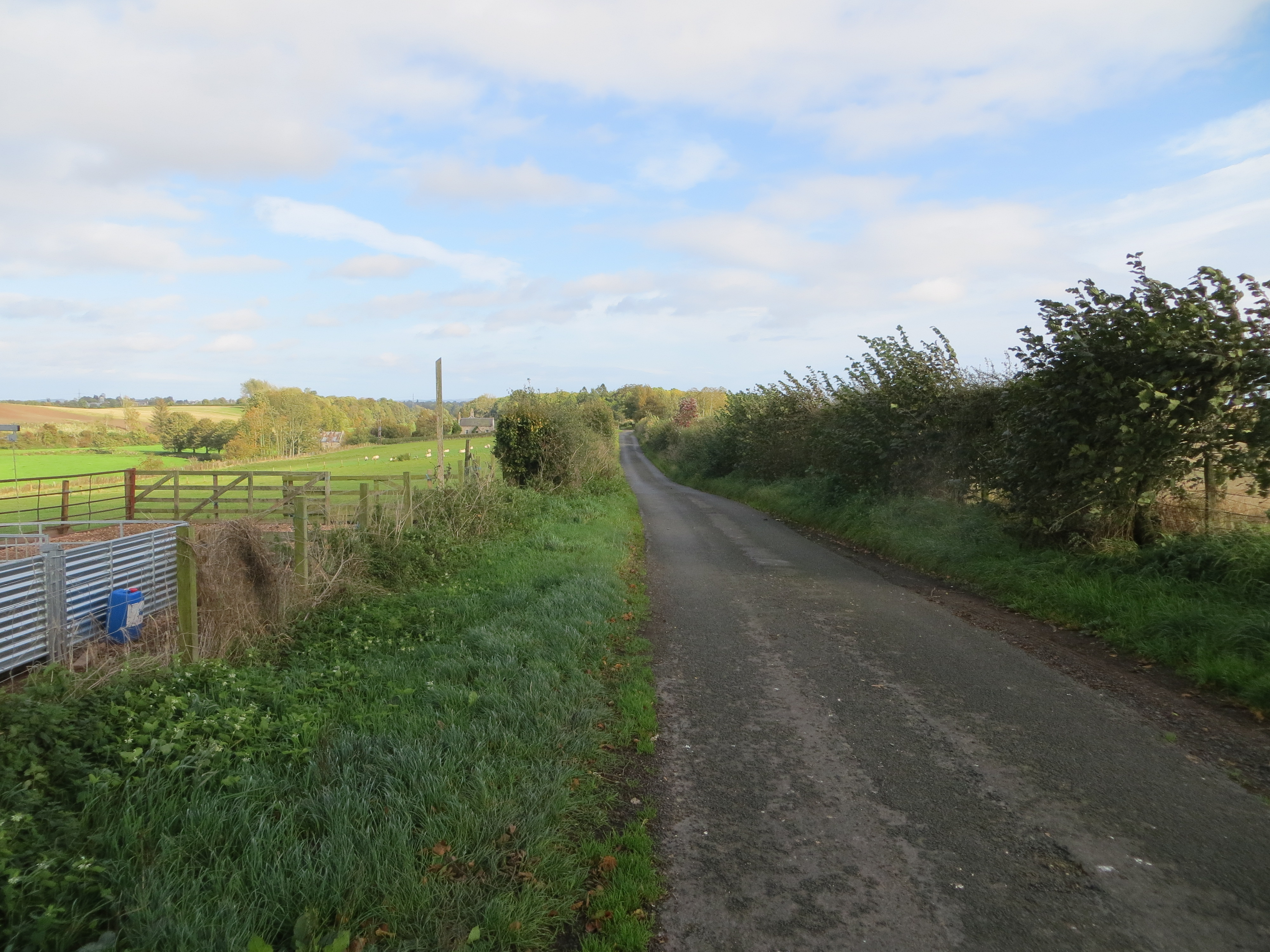
Hedge-lined minor road approaching Cairn's Mill from Bogend Farm

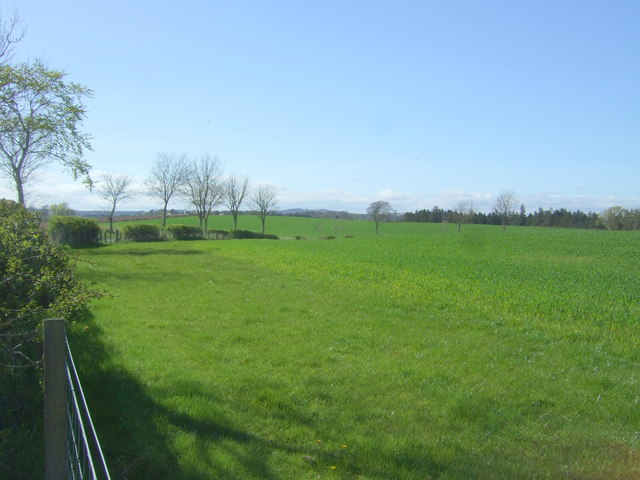
Road and fields near Cairn's Mill, en route from Bogend to Cairn's Mill, behind the ridge on the right

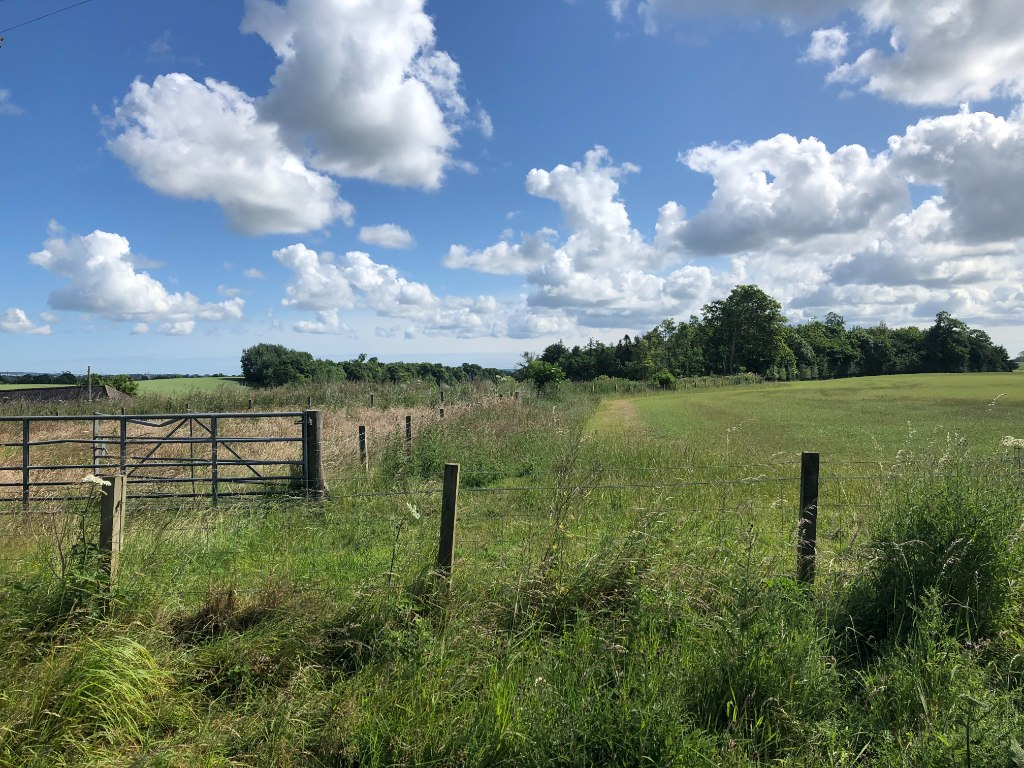
Woods near Cairn's Mill

== Bibliography ==
- Grant, Francis J. (1897). THE COMMISSARIOT RECORD OF EDINBURGH. REGISTER OF TESTAMENTS. PART 1. VOLUMES 1 TO 35 -- 1514-1600. The British Record Society, Limited, Edinburgh.
- THE BANNATYNE CLUB (1846). Liber S. Marie de Calchou 1113-1567, RENTALL OF THE ABBACIE, FOGO KIRK. p. 504.
- Earl of Hertford (1891). "A CONTEMPORARY ACCOUNT OF THE EARL OF HERTFORD'S SECOND EXPEDITION TO SCOTLAND", Sept. 1545. doi:10.9750/PSAS.001.271.279. "scan of the typeset report"
- Berwickshire County Council (1932). "1932 Report by Berwickshire (Scotland) County Council, chapter 'MILK GRADING'".
