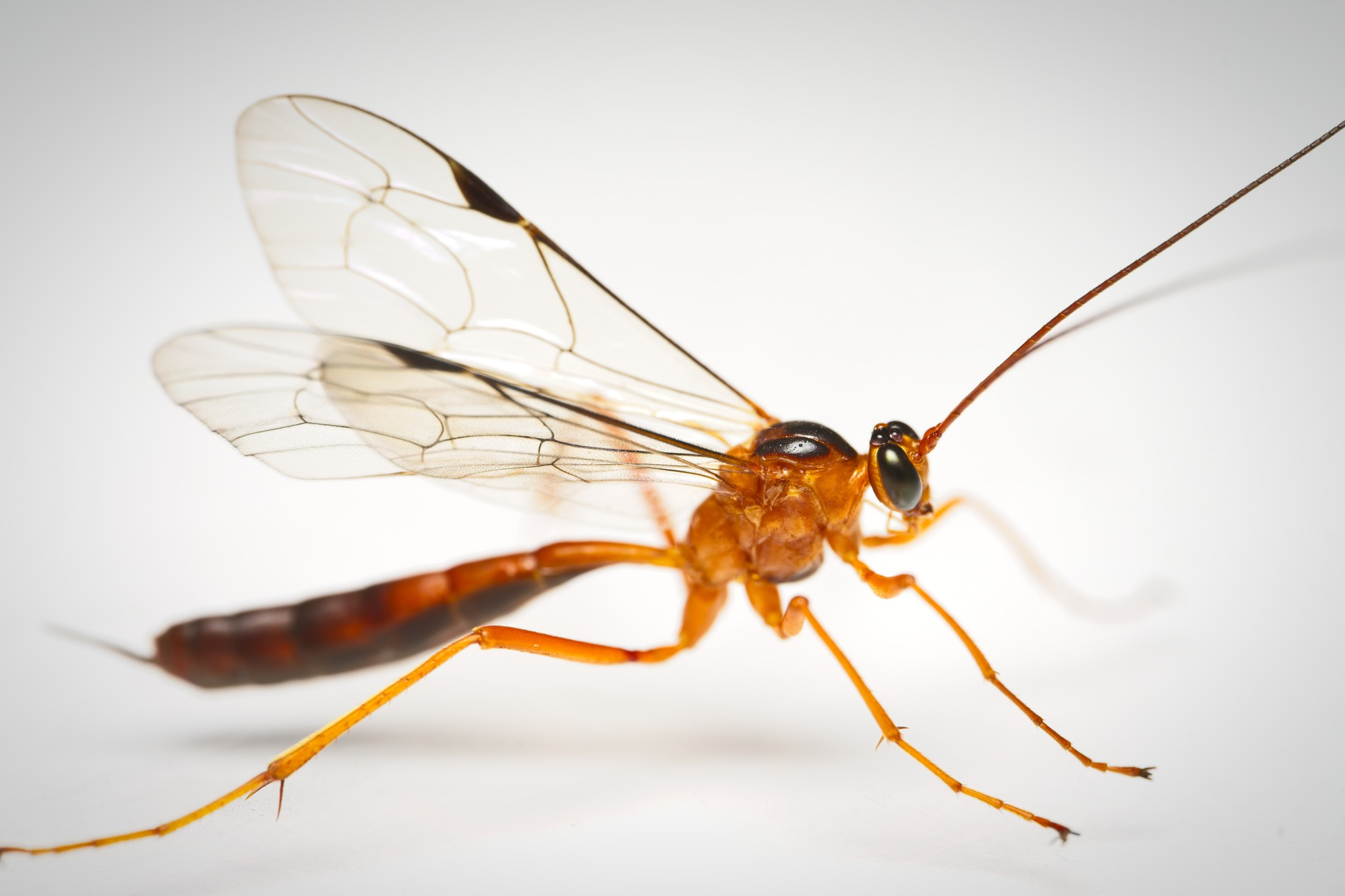

Scientific classification
- Kingdom: Animalia
- Phylum: Arthropoda
- Clade: Pancrustacea
- Class: Insecta
- Order: Hymenoptera
- Family: Ichneumonidae
- Genus: Netelia
- Species: N. ephippiata

Binomial name
- Netelia ephippiata (Smith, 1876)

Synonyms
- List: Paniscus ephippiatus Smith, 1876; Paniscus smithii Dalla Torre, 1901; Netelia ephippiatus (Smith, 1876)

= Netelia ephippiata =

Species of wasp

Netelia ephippiata is a species of Ichneumonidae wasp endemic to New Zealand.

== Host ==
N. ephippiata are parasitoids, meaning their young are forcibly laid and develop in other species, killing the host. Their only known host is the larvae of Orthoclydon praefectata, a species of moth.
