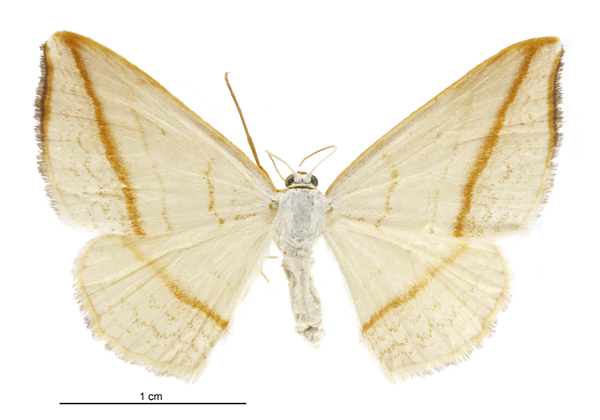
- Female
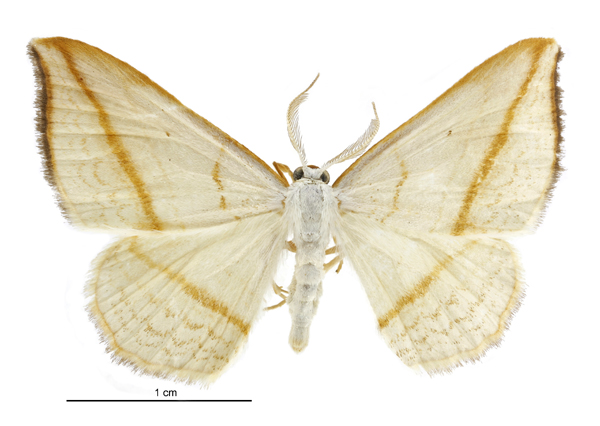
- Male

Conservation status
- Nationally Critical (NZ TCS)

Scientific classification
- Kingdom: Animalia
- Phylum: Arthropoda
- Class: Insecta
- Order: Lepidoptera
- Family: Geometridae
- Genus: Orthoclydon
- Species: O. pseudostinaria

Binomial name
- Orthoclydon pseudostinaria (Hudson, 1918)

Synonyms
- Xanthorhoe pseudostinaria Hudson, 1918

= Orthoclydon pseudostinaria =

Species of moth

Orthoclydon pseudostinaria is a species of moth in the family Geometridae. It is endemic to New Zealand. It is classified as critically endangered by the Department of Conservation.

== Taxonomy ==
This species was first described by George Vernon Hudson in 1918 under the name Xanthorhoe pseudostinaria. Hudson subsequently placed the species within the genus Orthoclydon.

== Description ==
Hudson described the species as follows:

The expansion of the wings is 1 1/8 inches. The fore wings are rather broad with the apex very slightly projecting and the termen slightly bowed; cream-coloured with bright brown markings; there is a narrow line along the costa; a faint slightly curved line on the inner edge of the median band; a small blackish discal dot; a straight, oblique, very strongly marked line from near the apex to the dorsum at 3/4, and a very faint wavy subterminal line; a dark brown terminal line is situated below the apex, where the cilia are also dark brown. The hind wings are cream-coloured with a conspicuous brown line across the middle and very faint traces of one basal and two subterminal lines. Except as above indicated the cilia of all the wings are cream-coloured.

== Distribution ==
Orthoclydon pseudostinaria is endemic to New Zealand. Hudson first collected the species at Otira. The moth was subsequently also found to be present at Gouland Downs near Nelson as well as in the Nelson district, Mount Grey and White Rock in Canterbury.

== Plant hosts ==
The plant host of O. pseudostinaria is unknown. Given the rarity of the moth species it has been hypothesized that the host plant is also uncommon.

== Conservation status ==
In 1928 Hudson regarded this species as being very rare and this moth is now classified under the New Zealand Threat Classification system as being Nationally Critical.
