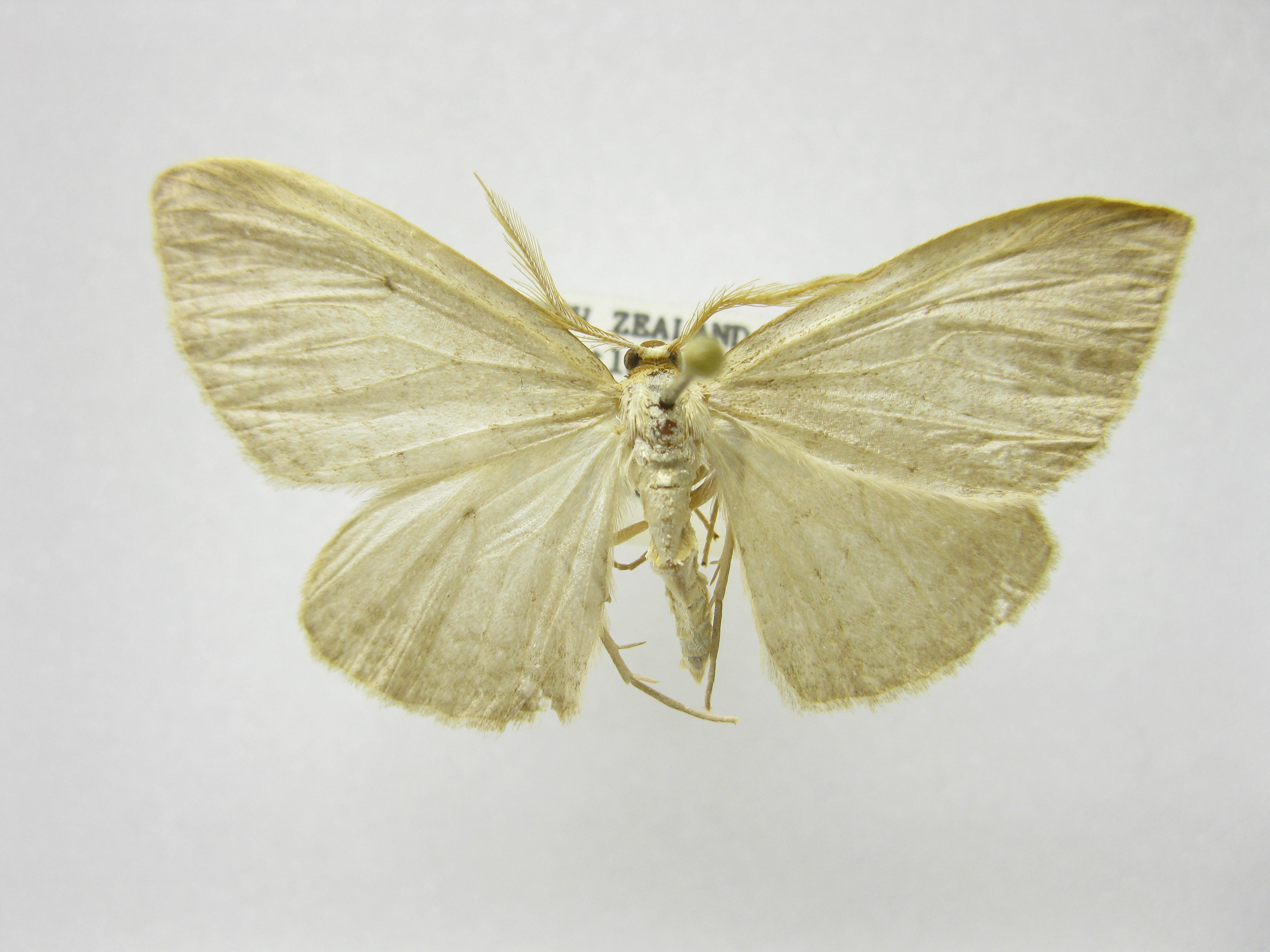
- Orthoclydon praefectata

Scientific classification
- Kingdom: Animalia
- Phylum: Arthropoda
- Clade: Pancrustacea
- Class: Insecta
- Order: Lepidoptera
- Family: Geometridae
- Subfamily: Larentiinae
- Genus: Orthoclydon; Warren, 1894

= Orthoclydon =

Genus of moths

Orthoclydon is a genus of moths in the family Geometridae. This genus is endemic to New Zealand. This genus was first described in 1894 by William Warren.

== Species ==
Species within the genus include:

- Orthoclydon chlorias (Meyrick, 1883)
- Orthoclydon praefectata (Walker, 1861)
- Orthoclydon pseudostinaria (Hudson, 1918)
