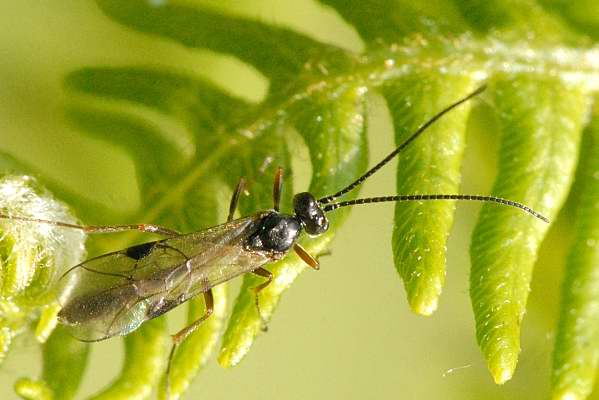

Scientific classification
- Kingdom: Animalia
- Phylum: Arthropoda
- Clade: Pancrustacea
- Class: Insecta
- Order: Hymenoptera
- Family: Ichneumonidae
- Genus: Hercus
- Species: H. fontinalis

Binomial name
- Hercus fontinalis (Holmgren, 1857)

= Hercus fontinalis =

Species of wasp

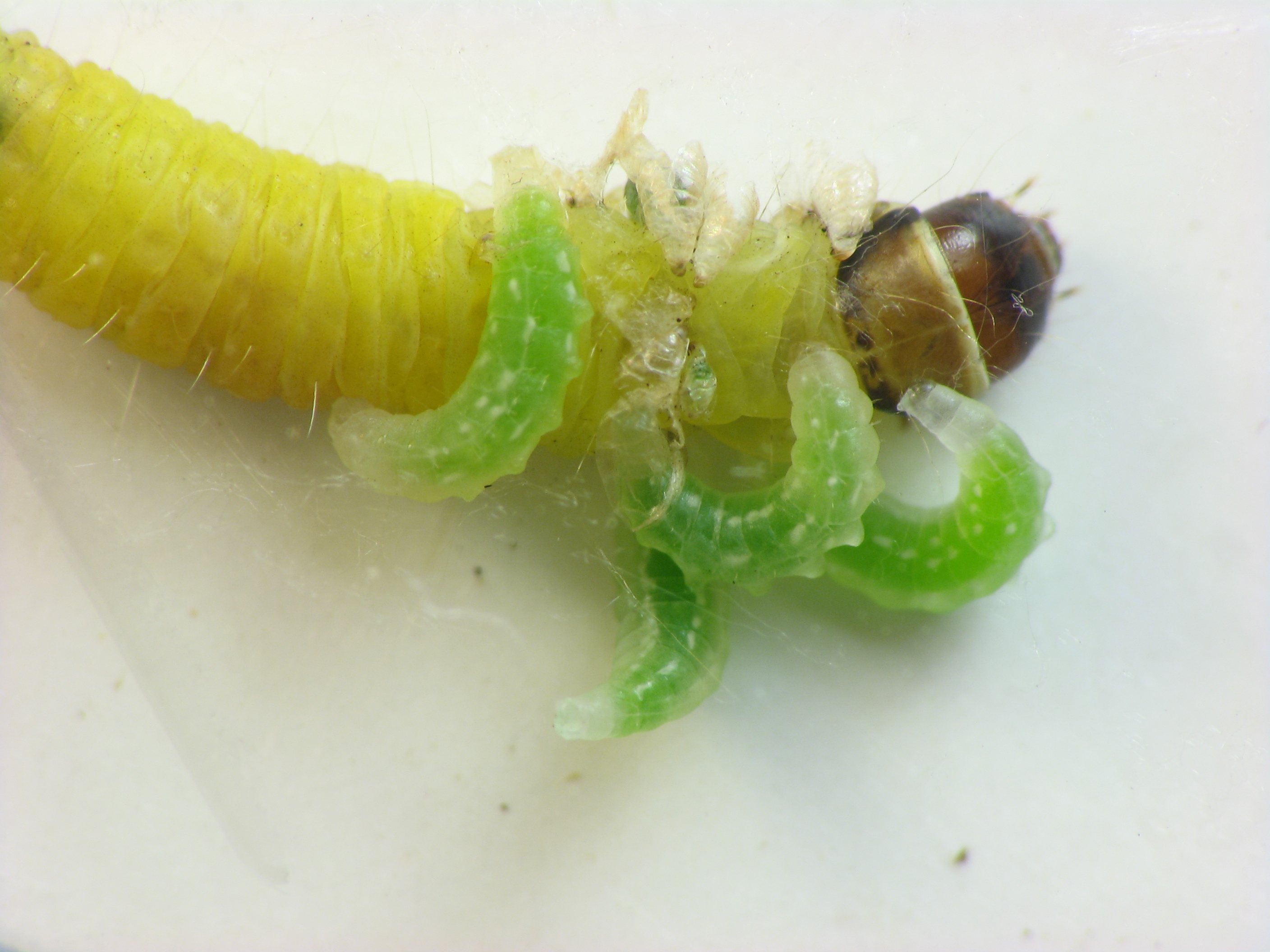
H. fontinalis later instar larvae feeding on caterpillar

Hercus fontinalis is a species of ichneumon wasp in the family Ichneumonidae. It is found in the United States and Europe. It is an ectoparasite of Tortricidae caterpillars.

== Subspecies ==
These two subspecies belong to the species Hercus fontinalis:

- Hercus fontinalis flavens Townes & Gupta, 1992^{c g}
- Hercus fontinalis fontinalis^{g}

Data sources: i = ITIS, c = Catalogue of Life, g = GBIF, b = Bugguide.net
