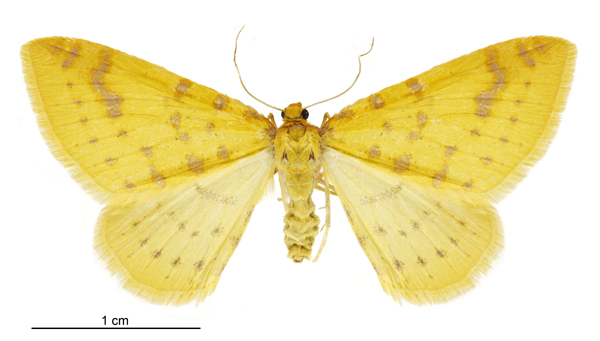
- Female
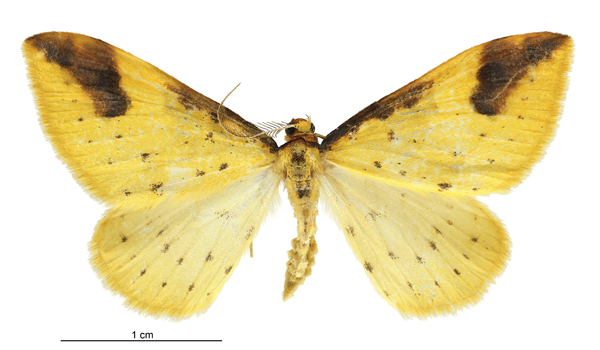
- Male

Scientific classification
- Kingdom: Animalia
- Phylum: Arthropoda
- Clade: Pancrustacea
- Class: Insecta
- Order: Lepidoptera
- Family: Geometridae
- Genus: Orthoclydon
- Species: O. chlorias

Binomial name
- Orthoclydon chlorias (Meyrick, 1883)

Synonyms
- Larentia chlorias Meyrick, 1883; Venusia princeps Hudson, 1903; Xanthorhoe chlorias (Meyrick, 1883)

= Orthoclydon chlorias =

Species of moth

Orthoclydon chlorias is a species of moth in the family Geometridae. This species was first described by Edward Meyrick in 1883. It is endemic to New Zealand.

== Taxonomy ==
This species was first described by Edward Meyrick in 1883 under the name Larentia chlorias. Meyrick went on to give a more detailed description of the species in 1884. In 1903 George Hudson, thinking he was describing the species for the first time, also named the species Venusia princeps. In 1905 Meyrick synonymised this name and placed this species within the genus Xanthorhoe. In 1928 Hudson illustrated and discussed this species in his book The Butterflies and Moths of New Zealand under its current name Orthoclydon chlorias.

== Description ==
Meyrick described the species as follows:

Male.— 30 mm. Forewings moderate, hindmargin hardly rounded; bright yellow; base of costa dark fuscous-purple; a curved row of three very small dark purple-fuscous spots about J, and another of four spots before middle, costal spots larger; a triangular purple blotch on costa before apex, reaching half across wing, anteriorly margined by a strongly sinuate bluish-black streak; a row of three dark purple-fuscous dots from apex of this to inner margin, and a subterminal row of six similar dots; cilia yellow. Hindwings moderate, hindmargin rounded; rather paler than forewings, with two curved posterior rows of cloudy purple-fuscous dots.

== Distribution ==
Orthoclydon chlorias is endemic to New Zealand. Meyrick first collected the species at near Castle Hill. The moth has subsequently also been found at Mount Hector, Tararua range, Dun Mountain, and at Dunedin. This species can be found up to altitudes of 1900 m.

== Plant hosts ==
Orthoclydon chlorias larvae feed on the leaves of Gaultheria species.
