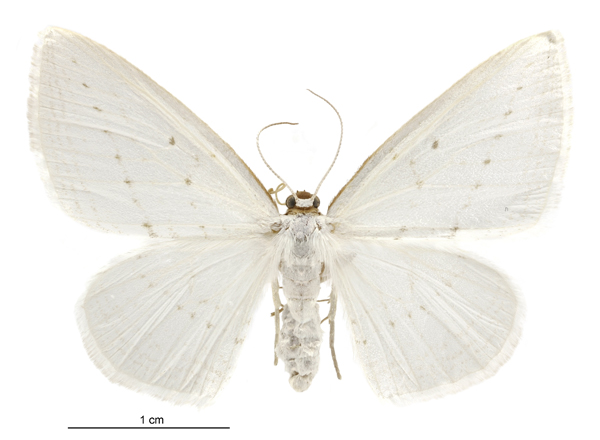
- Female specimen
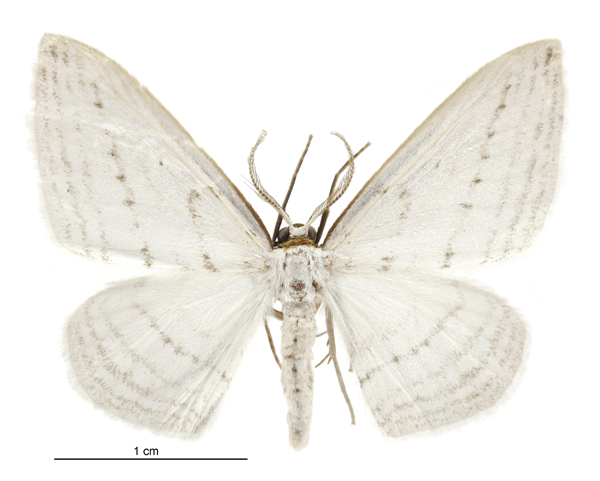
- Male specimen

Scientific classification
- Kingdom: Animalia
- Phylum: Arthropoda
- Clade: Pancrustacea
- Class: Insecta
- Order: Lepidoptera
- Family: Geometridae
- Genus: Orthoclydon
- Species: O. praefectata

Binomial name
- Orthoclydon praefectata (Walker, 1861)

Synonyms
- Acidalia praefectata Walker, 1861; Acidalia praefactata (Walker, 1861); Xanthorhoe praefectata (Walker, 1861); Acidalia subtentaria Walker, 1863

= Orthoclydon praefectata =

Species of moth

Orthoclydon praefectata, the flax looper moth or flax window maker, is a moth of the family Geometridae. It is endemic to New Zealand.

== Description ==
The wing span of this species is 38–45 mm. The male moth is a pale brown and the female a glossy white.

== Taxonomy ==
O. praefectata was first described by Francis Walker under the name Acidalia praefectata. George Hudson discussed and illustrated this species in 1898 under the name Xanthorhoe praefectata.

== Distribution and habitat ==
This moth is endemic to and is widely distributed throughout New Zealand.

The habitat/food plant for this moth is the New Zealand native flax Phormium tenax.

== Life cycle ==
Eggs are straw coloured and are laid on the underside of the flax leaf.

The caterpillar is brown/green. It has three dark red lines on its back and a yellow line on each flank. When fully grown it is approximately 2.5 cm long.

Adult moths are seen in all the summer months. They are attracted to light and have been collected via a mercury vapour light trap.

== Predators and parasites ==
The larvae of this species are known to be parasitised by wasps such as Netelia ephippiata, Lissopimpla excelsa and Rogas. They are also known to be preyed upon by hoverfly larvae such as those in Melangyna novaezealandiae and Allograpta ropala.

== See also ==
- Butterflies of New Zealand
