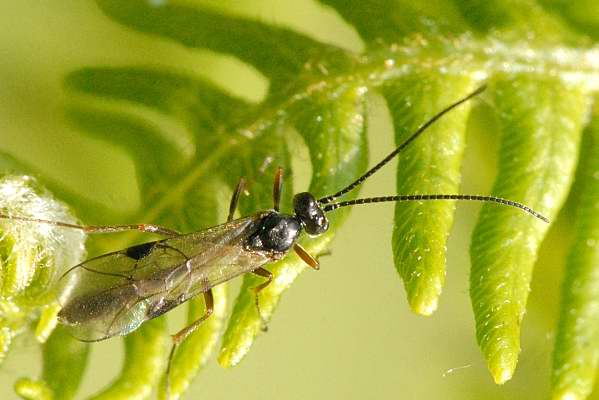
- Hercus fontinalis

Scientific classification
- Kingdom: Animalia
- Phylum: Arthropoda
- Class: Insecta
- Order: Hymenoptera
- Family: Ichneumonidae
- Tribe: Oedemopsini
- Genus: Hercus; Townes, 1969

= Hercus (wasp) =

Genus of wasps

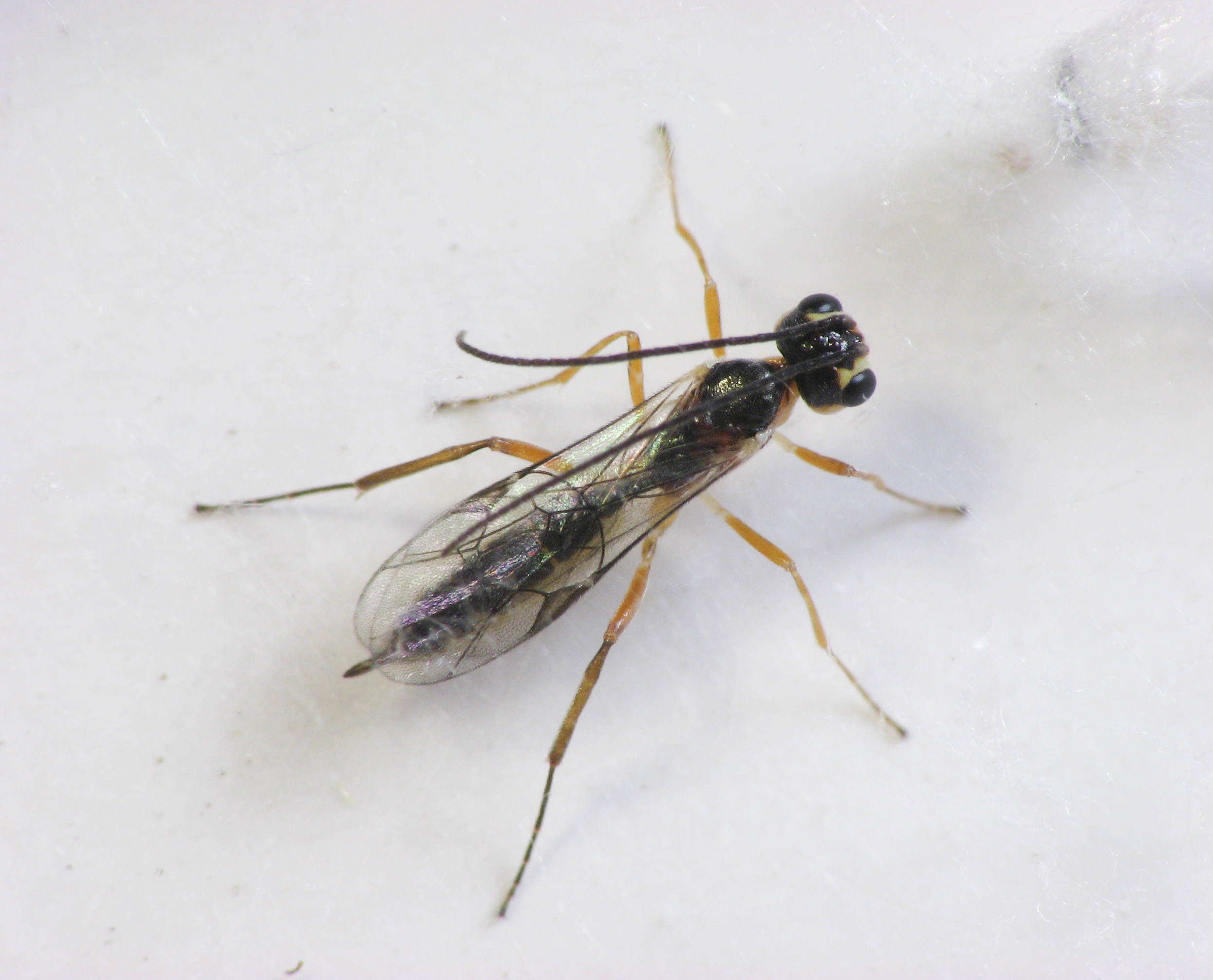
Hercus fontinalis female

Hercus is a genus of ichneumonid wasp in the subfamily Tryphoninae. There are about seven described species in Hercus.

== Species ==
These seven species belong to the genus Hercus:

- Hercus coracinus Gupta, 1984^{c g}
- Hercus fontinalis (Holmgren, 1857)^{c g b}
- Hercus nepalensis Gupta, 1984^{c g}
- Hercus peruensis Gupta, 1984^{c g}
- Hercus rectus Gupta, 1984^{c g}
- Hercus rufithorax Gupta, 1984^{c g}
- Hercus tibialis Kasparyan, 1994^{c g}

Data sources: i = ITIS, c = Catalogue of Life, g = GBIF, b = Bugguide.net
