= Eclytus =

Scientific classification
- Kingdom: Animalia
- Phylum: Arthropoda
- Clade: Pancrustacea
- Class: Insecta
- Order: Hymenoptera
- Family: Ichneumonidae
- Genus: Eclytus; Holmgren, 1857

Genus of insects

Eclytus is a genus of parasitoid wasps belonging to the family Ichneumonidae.

The species of this genus are found in Europe and Northern America.

Species:

- Eclytus abdominalis Kasparyan, 1977
- Eclytus cephalotes Kasparyan, 1977
