= Erromenus =

Scientific classification
- Kingdom: Animalia
- Phylum: Arthropoda
- Class: Insecta
- Order: Hymenoptera
- Family: Ichneumonidae
- Genus: Erromenus; Holmgren, 1857

Genus of insects

Erromenus is a genus of parasitoid wasps belonging to the family Ichneumonidae.

The species of this genus are found in Europe and North America.

Species:

- Erromenus acutus Townes & Gupta, 1992
- Erromenus alpestrator Aubert, 1969
- Erromenus alpinator Aubert, 1969
- Erromenus analis Brischke, 1871
- Erromenus apertus Townes & Gupta, 1992
- Erromenus atrator Kasparyan, 2020
- Erromenus basimacula Townes & Gupta, 1992
- Erromenus bibulus Kasparyan, 1973
- Erromenus brunnicans (Gravenhorst, 1829)
- Erromenus caelator Townes & Townes, 1949
- Erromenus calcator (Muller, 1776)
- Erromenus defectivus Brischke, 1892
- Erromenus defrictus Townes & Townes, 1949
- Erromenus fumatus Brischke, 1871
- Erromenus glabrosus Davis, 1897
- Erromenus irrasus Townes & Gupta, 1992
- Erromenus labidus Townes & Gupta, 1992
- Erromenus labratus Townes & Townes, 1949
- Erromenus lacunosus Kasparyan, 1973
- Erromenus legnotus Townes & Gupta, 1992
- Erromenus marginatus Provancher, 1883
- Erromenus melanonotus (Gravenhorst, 1829)
- Erromenus nasalis Townes & Townes, 1949
- Erromenus planus Townes & Townes, 1949
- Erromenus plebejus (Woldstedt, 1878)
- Erromenus punctatus (Woldstedt, 1878)
- Erromenus punctidens Townes & Gupta, 1992
- Erromenus punctulatus Holmgren, 1857
- Erromenus rufifemur Lee & Cha, 1993
- Erromenus scaberTownes & Gupta, 1992
- Erromenus spec (Thunberg, 1822)
- Erromenus tarsator Aubert, 1969
- Erromenus terebrellator Aubert, 1969
- Erromenus tereshkini Kasparyan, 2020
- Erromenus tonto Townes & Townes, 1949
- Erromenus ungulatus Townes & Townes, 1949
- Erromenus variolae Townes & Townes, 1949
- Erromenus zonarius (Gravenhorst, 1820)
