= List of listed buildings in Fogo, Scottish Borders =

This is a list of listed buildings in the parish of Fogo in the Scottish Borders, Scotland.

== List ==
Name	Location	Date listed	Grid ref. (Note: Sometimes known as OSGB36, the grid reference (where provided) is based on the British national grid reference system used by the Ordnance Survey. • "Guide to National Grid". Ordnance Survey. • "Get-a-map". Ordnance Survey.)	Geo-coordinates	Notes	LB number (Note: Historic Environment Scotland assign a unique alphanumeric identifier to each designated site in Scotland, for listed buildings this always begins with "LB", for example "LB12345".)	Image
Bogend Farm Cottages 1 - 10 (inclusive numbers) Including Ancillary Structure And Railings				55°44′13″N 2°19′44″W	Category C(S)	45763	Upload another image
Cairn's Mill Cottage Including Mill Steading And Cairn's Mill				55°44′19″N 2°20′22″W	Category C(S)	45764	Upload another image
Caldra Farm Including Farmhouse, Cottages And Gatepiers (East Range), also refer to West Range, North Range, South Range				55°44′24″N 2°21′51″W	Category B	10514	Upload another image
Caldra House, Quadrant Walls, Railings, Piers, Gatepiers And Gates				55°44′23″N 2°21′50″W	Category C(S)	45765	Upload Photo
Caldra House, Walled Garden including Bothy				55°44′12″N 2°21′54″W	Category C(S)	45766	Upload another image
Charterhall House Including Office Range, Courtyard Cottage And Sundial				55°43′07″N 2°22′42″W	Category B	45767	Upload Photo
Charterhall, Lodge Including Quadrant Walls, Gatepiers And Gates				55°43′06″N 2°22′56″W	Category C(S)	45768	Upload Photo
Charterhall, Stable Courtyard Including Cobbled Drive And Courtyard, Gatepiers, Groom's Cottage And Stable Cottages				55°43′10″N 2°22′47″W	Category B	45770	Upload Photo
Charterhall, South Lodge Including Quadrant Walls, Piers, Gatepiers And Gates				55°42′43″N 2°22′00″W	Category B	45769	Upload another image
de: Fogo Bridge				55°44′08″N 2°22′05″W	Category A	10513	Upload another image
Fogo Former School Including Railings				55°44′04″N 2°21′54″W	Category C(S)	45772	Upload Photo
Fogo House (Former Manse) Including Stable Block, Garden Walls, Boundary Walls And Gatepiers				55°44′05″N 2°21′49″W	Category C(S)	45771	Upload Photo
Fogo Kirk, Church Of Scotland, Including Inner And Outer Graveyards, Boundary Walls And Lych Gate				55°44′08″N 2°21′49″W	Category A	10512	Upload another image See more images
Fogo, Studio Cottage Including Cobbled Forecourt				55°44′04″N 2°21′53″W	Category C(S)	45776	Upload Photo
Fogomuir Cottages Including Garden Wall				55°43′24″N 2°22′41″W	Category C(S)	45773	Upload Photo
Fogorig Farmhouse Including Ancillary Structures, Garden Walls And Boundary Walls				55°43′35″N 2°21′32″W	Category C(S)	45774	Upload another image
Harcarse Farmhouse Including Railings, Gatepiers And Gate				55°43′54″N 2°18′03″W	Category C(S)	45775	Upload Photo
Whinkerstones Farm Cottage				55°43′01″N 2°22′01″W	Category C(S)	45777	Upload another image

== Key ==
The scheme for classifying buildings in Scotland is:

- Category A: "buildings of national or international importance, either architectural or historic; or fine, little-altered examples of some particular period, style or building type."
- Category B: "buildings of regional or more than local importance; or major examples of some particular period, style or building type, which may have been altered."
- Category C: "buildings of local importance; lesser examples of any period, style, or building type, as originally constructed or moderately altered; and simple traditional buildings which group well with other listed buildings."

In March 2016 there were 47,288 listed buildings in Scotland. Of these, 8% were Category A, and 50% were Category B, with the remaining 42% being Category C.
