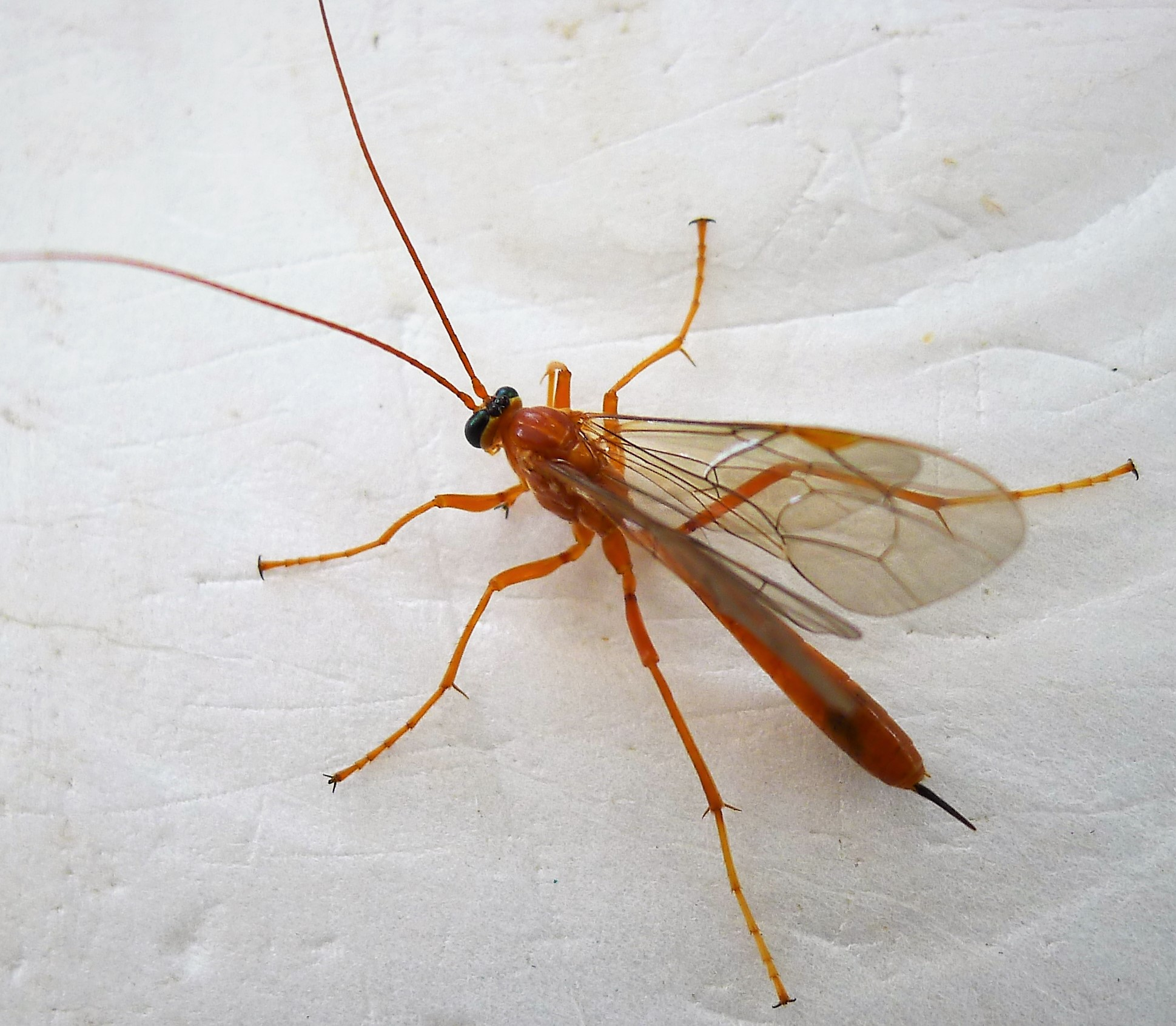

Scientific classification
- Kingdom: Animalia
- Phylum: Arthropoda
- Class: Insecta
- Order: Hymenoptera
- Family: Ichneumonidae
- Subfamily: Tryphoninae
- Tribe: Phytodietini
- Genus: Netelia; Gray, 1860

Species
- 335 listed species

= Netelia =

Genus of wasps

Netelia is a genus of ichneumonid wasps in the subfamily Tryphoninae. There are over 330 described species in Netelia grouped into 12 subgenera.

== Description and identification ==
Netelia generally are entirely orange to brownish yellow in color and are medium to large in size, with a fore wing measuring between 6 and 20 mm. They have large ocelli, which often touch the compound eyes and mandibles that are twisted 90°. Both their antennae and legs are conspicuously long for ichneumonids. In contrast to the superficially similar Ophioninae, the forewing usually has veins 2r-m and 3r-m present, the latter of which forms a small, triangular areolet, and has the Rs vein strongly bent as it approaches 3r-m. The ovipositor is also prominent, ranging from 0.3 to 0.7 times the length of the hind tibia.

Identification of species is problematic as most species are similar in both morphology and coloration. The only reliable way to diagnose species is through examination of male genitalia, particularly a structure on the clasper. The strong similarity between species has resulted in misidentifications as well as erroneous reports of species well outside of their natural ranges.

== Distribution ==
This genus is cosmopolitan. The genus has a high density of species, with 81 species reported just between the United States and Canada, for example.

== Species ==
- List of Netelia species
