= Coatue =

Coatue may refer to:

- Coatue, a village in Massachusetts, US
  - Coskata-Coatue Wildlife Refuge, Nantucket Island
- Coatue Management, an investment management firm
