= Nantucket National Wildlife Refuge =

Protected area in Massachusetts, US

- IUCN category IV (habitat/species management area)
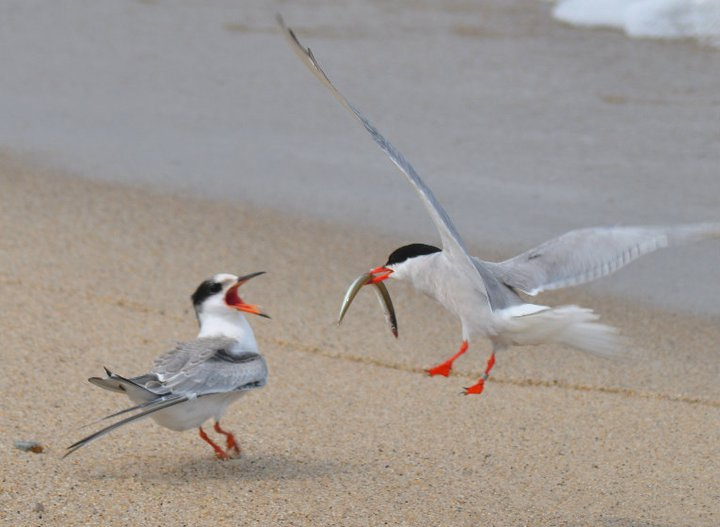
- An adult Common Tern feeding a juvenile at Nantucket National Wildlife Refuge

- Location within the United States
- Location: Great Point, Nantucket, Massachusetts, United States
- Nearest city: Nantucket, Massachusetts
- Coordinates: 41°20′05″N 70°02′15″W
- Area: 24 acres (9.7 ha)
- Established: 1973
- Governing body: U.S. Fish and Wildlife Service
- Website: Nantucket National Wildlife Refuge

Nantucket National Wildlife Refuge is a 24-acre (9.7 ha) range and was established in 1973 for its "particular value in carrying out the national migratory bird management program". The refuge, which is cooperatively managed with The Trustees of Reservations, encompasses 24 acres (9.7 ha) at Great Point. Nantucket National Wildlife Refuge is an un-staffed unit of the Eastern Massachusetts National Wildlife Refuge Complex. Nantucket National Wildlife Refuge consists of the Northeast tip of Nantucket, known as Great Point. The Refuge has been managed informally by TTOR several decades. TTOR owns the land immediately adjacent to Great Point, known as the Coskata-Coatue Wildlife Refuge. Great Point is known as one of the best surfcasting locations in New England because of the rip tide which brings bluefish and striped bass to the point. The Refuge is also a destination for hundreds of visitors each year seeking to enjoy a Nantucket beach or a tour of the Great Point Lighthouse. More information about the adjacent TTOR property is available on their website.

The refuge is an important stopover site for migratory birds and protects habitat for the federally listed piping plover and roseate tern, as well as the State-listed common and least tern. Gray and harbor seals are also frequently seen hauling out on the refuge. A variety of gull species also inhabit the refuge which at times can be detrimental to the successful nesting of shorebirds
