= Reighardia sternae =

Scientific classification
- Domain: Eukaryota
- Kingdom: Animalia
- Phylum: Arthropoda
- Class: Ichthyostraca
- Order: Reighardiida
- Family: Reighardiidae
- Genus: Reighardia
- Species: R. sternae

Binomial name
- Reighardia sternae (Diesing, 1864)

Species of crustacean

Reighardia sternae, also known as the larid pentastome, is a small internal parasitic crustacean. It is the only Pentastomida species to use gulls and terns as hosts, living in the body cavity and air sacs.
