= Influenza A virus subtype H5N3 =

Virus classification
- (unranked): Virus
- Realm: Riboviria
- Kingdom: Orthornavirae
- Phylum: Negarnaviricota
- Class: Insthoviricetes
- Order: Articulavirales
- Family: Orthomyxoviridae
- Genus: Alphainfluenzavirus
- Species: Influenza A virus
- Serotype: Influenza A virus subtype H5N3

Virus subtype

H5N3 is a subtype of the species Influenza A virus (sometimes called the bird flu virus).

== History ==
H5N3 was identified in Quebec in August 2005 and in Sweden in October 2005.

H5N3 virus was identified at a farm in La Garnache, France in late January 2009. Ninety birds were found dead between 29 January 2009 and 31 January 2009. The remaining stock of 4,932 birds was culled on 1 February 2009.

In Germany, in December 2013, 102 ostriches and 28 chickens in a farm in Blumberg were slaughtered due to suspicion of infection with avian influenza. Samples showed that the birds were infected with the H5N3 virus.
