= Reighardiidae =

Scientific classification
- Kingdom: Animalia
- Phylum: Arthropoda
- Class: Ichthyostraca
- Subclass: Pentastomida
- Order: Reighardiida; Almeida & Christoffersen, 1999
- Family: Reighardiidae; Heymons, 1926

Family of crustaceans

Reighardiidae is a family of crustaceans belonging to the subclass Pentastomida. It is the only family in the monotypic order Reighardiida. The species are parasites of birds, and are found globally.

== Genera ==
There are two genera recognised in the family Reighardiidae:

- Hispania Martínez, Criado-Fornelio, Lanzarot, Fernández-García, Rodríguez-Caabeiro & Merino, 2004 - Europe; vulture Aegypius monachus
- Reighardia Ward, 1899 - South America, Antarctica; seabirds
