= Coskata-Coatue Wildlife Refuge =

Nature preserve in Massachusetts, U.S.

Coordinates: 41°21′33″N 70°1′8″W

The Coskata-Coatue Wildlife Refuge is a nature preserve on Nantucket Island and is managed by the Trustees of Reservations. It encompasses miles of beaches, the largest red cedar woodland in New England and Great Point Light. The reservation began with an acquisition of land in 1974.

The Refuge has had significant funding and focus on adaptation to climate change, with managed retreat and coastal management strategies, and was profiled in the America Adapts podcast.
