= List of Cirripedia genera =

These genera belong to Cirripedia, a subclass of barnacles in the phylum of Crustacea, as classified by Chan et al. (2021) and the World Register of Marine Species. Their classification into order, superfamily, family, and subfamily is included.

== Cirripedia genera ==
- Infraclass Acrothoracica Gruvel, 1905
  - Order Cryptophialida Kolbasov, Newman & Hoeg, 2009
    - Family Cryptophialidae Gerstaecker, 1866
      - Genus Australophialus Tomlinson, 1969
      - Genus Cryptophialus Darwin, 1854
  - Order Lithoglyptida Kolbasov, Newman & Hoeg, 2009
    - Family Lithoglyptidae Aurivillius, 1892
      - Subfamily Berndtiinae Utinomi, 1950
        - Genus Berndtia Utinomi, 1950
        - Genus Weltneria Berndt, 1907
      - Subfamily Kochlorininae Gruvel, 1905
        - Genus Kochlorine Noll, 1872
        - Genus Kochlorinopsis Stubbings, 1967
      - Subfamily Lithoglyptinae Aurivillius, 1892
        - Genus Auritoglyptes Kolbasov & Newman, 2005
        - Genus Balanodytes Utinomi, 1950
        - Genus Lithoglyptes Aurivillius, 1892
    - Family Trypetesidae Stebbing, 1910
      - Genus Tomlinsonia Turquier, 1985
      - Genus Trypetesa Norman, 1903
- Infraclass Rhizocephala Müller, 1862
  - Family Chthamalophilidae Bocquet-Védrine, 1961
    - Genus Bocquetia Pawlik, 1987
    - Genus Boschmaella Bocquet-Védrine, 1968
    - Genus Chthamalophilus Bocquet-Védrine, 1957
  - Family Clistosaccidae Boschma, 1928
    - Genus Clistosaccus Lilljeborg, 1861
    - Genus Sylon M. Sars, 1870
  - Family Duplorbidae Høeg & Rybakov, 1992
    - Genus Arcturosaccus Rybakov & Høeg, 1992
    - Genus Cryptogaster Bocquet-Védrine & Bourdon, 1984
    - Genus Duplorbis Smith, 1906
  - Family Mycetomorphidae Høeg & Rybakov, 1992
    - Genus Mycetomorpha Potts, 1912
  - Family Parthenopeidae Rybakov & Høeg, 2013
    - Genus Parthenopea Kossmann, 1874
  - Family Peltogasterellidae Høeg & Glenner in Høeg, Noever, Rees, Crandall & Glenner, 2019
    - Genus Angulosaccus Reinhard, 1944
    - Genus Boschmaia Reinhard, 1958
    - Genus Cyphosaccus Reinhard, 1958
    - Genus Peltogasterella Krüger, 1912
  - Family Peltogastridae Lilljeborg, 1861
    - Genus Briarosaccus Boschma, 1930
    - Genus Dipterosaccus Van Kampen & Boschma, 1925
    - Genus Galatheascus Boschma, 1929
    - Genus Lernaeodiscus Müller, 1862
    - Genus Ommatogaster Yoshida & Osawa in Yoshida, Osawa, Hirose & Hirose, 2011
    - Genus Paratriangulus Høeg & Glenner in Høeg, Noever, Rees, Crandall & Glenner, 2019
    - Genus Peltogaster Rathke, 1842
    - Genus Pterogaster Van Baal, 1937
    - Genus Septodiscus Van Baal, 1937
    - Genus Septosaccus Duboscq, 1912
    - Genus Temnascus Boschma, 1951
    - Genus Tortugaster Reinhard, 1948
    - Genus Trachelosaccus Boschma, 1928
    - Genus Triangulopsis Guérin-Ganivet, 1911
  - Family Pirusaccidae Høeg & Glenner in Høeg, Noever, Rees, Crandall & Glenner, 2019
    - Genus Pirusaccus Lützen, 1985
  - Family Polyascidae Høeg & Glenner in Høeg, Noever, Rees, Crandall & Glenner, 2019
    - Genus Parasacculina Høeg & Glenner in Høeg, Noever, Rees, Crandall & Glenner, 2019
    - Genus Polyascus Glenner, Lützen & Takahashi, 2003
  - Family Polysaccidae Lützen & Takahashi, 1996
    - Genus Polysaccus Høeg & Lützen, 1993
  - Family Sacculinidae Lilljeborg, 1861
    - Genus Drepanorchis Boschma, 1927
    - Genus Heterosaccus Smith, 1906
    - Genus Loxothylacus Boschma, 1928
    - Genus Ptychascus Boschma, 1933
    - Genus Sacculina Thompson, 1836
    - Genus Sesarmaxenos Annandale, 1911
  - Family Thompsoniidae Høeg & Rybakov, 1992
    - Genus Diplothylacus Høeg & Lützen, 1993
    - Genus Jensia Boyko & Williams in Hiller, Williams & Boyko, 2015
    - Genus Thompsonia Kossmann, 1872
    - Genus Thylacoplethus Coutière, 1902
  - Family Triangulidae Høeg & Glenner in Høeg, Noever, Rees, Crandall & Glenner, 2019
    - Genus Triangulus Smith, 1906
- Infraclass Thoracica Darwin, 1854
  - Superorder Phosphatothoracica Gale, 2019
    - Order Iblomorpha Buckeridge & Newman, 2006
      - Family Iblidae Leach, 1825
        - Subfamily Iblinae Leach, 1825
          - Genus Ibla Leach, 1825
        - Subfamily Neoiblinae Buckeridge & Newman, 2006
          - Genus Neoibla Buckeridge & Newman, 2006
      - Family Idioiblidae Buckeridge & Newman, 2006
        - Subfamily Chaetolepadinae Buckeridge & Newman, 2006
          - Genus Chaetolepas Studer, 1889
          - Genus Chitinolepas Buckeridge & Newman, 2006
        - Subfamily Idioiblinae Buckeridge & Newman, 2006
          - Genus Idioibla Buckeridge & Newman, 2006
    - Order †Eolepadomorpha Chan et al., 2021
      - Family †Eolepadidae Buckeridge, 1983
        - Genus †Eolepas Withers, 1928
        - Genus †Toarcolepas Gale & Schweigert, 2015
      - Family †Praelepadidae Chernyshev, 1930
        - Genus †Illilepas Schram, 1986
        - Genus †Praelepas Chernyshev, 1930
  - Superorder Thoracicalcarea Gale, 2015
    - Order Balanomorpha Pilsbry, 1916
      - Superfamily Balanoidea Leach, 1817
        - Family Balanidae Leach, 1817
          - Subfamily Acastinae Kolbasov, 1993
            - Genus Acasta Leach, 1817
            - Genus Archiacasta Kolbasov, 1993
            - Genus Euacasta Kolbasov, 1993
            - Genus Neoacasta Kolbasov, 1993
            - Genus Pectinoacasta Kolbasov, 1993
          - Subfamily Amphibalaninae Pitombo, 2004
            - Genus Amphibalanus Pitombo, 2004
            - Genus Fistulobalanus Zullo, 1984
            - Genus Tetrabalanus Cornwall, 1941
          - Subfamily Archaeobalaninae Newman & Ross, 1976
            - Genus Actinobalanus Moroni, 1967
            - Genus Armatobalanus Hoek, 1913
            - Genus Bathybalanus Hoek, 1913
            - Genus Chirona Gray, 1835
            - Genus Conopea Say, 1822
            - Genus Hesperibalanus Pilsbry, 1916
            - Genus Membranobalanus Hoek, 1913
            - Genus Notobalanus Newman & Ross, 1976
            - Genus Solidobalanus Hoek, 1913
            - Genus Striatobalanus Hoek, 1913
            - Genus †Archaeobalanus Menesini, 1971
            - Genus †Kathpalmeria Ross, 1965
            - Genus †Palaeobalanus Buckeridge, 1983
            - Genus †Zullobalanus Buckeridge, 1989
          - Subfamily Balaninae Leach, 1817
            - Genus Balanus Costa, 1778
            - Genus Tamiosoma Conrad, 1857
            - Genus Zulloa Ross & Newman, 1996
          - Subfamily Bryozobiinae Ross & Newman, 1996
            - Genus Bryozobia Ross & Newman, 1996
            - Genus Eoatria Van Syoc & Newman, 2010
            - Genus Microporatria Van Syoc & Newman, 2010
            - Genus Multatria Van Syoc & Newman, 2010
            - Genus Poratria Van Syoc & Newman, 2010
          - Subfamily Concavinae Zullo, 1992
            - Genus Arossia Newman, 1982
            - Genus Chesaconcavus Zullo, 1992
            - Genus Concavus Newman, 1982
            - Genus Menesiniella Newman, 1982
            - Genus Paraconcavus Zullo, 1992
            - Genus Perforatus Pitombo, 2004
            - Genus †Alessandriella Carriol & Cahuzac, 2001
            - Genus †Zulloconcavus Carriol, 2000
          - Subfamily Hexacreusiinae Zullo in Newman, 1996
            - Genus Hexacreusia Zullo, 1961
            - Genus Zulloana Pitombo & Ross, 2002
          - Subfamily Megabalaninae Leach, 1817
            - Genus Austromegabalanus Newman, 1979
            - Genus Fosterella Buckeridge, 1983
            - Genus Megabalanus Hoek, 1913
            - Genus Notomegabalanus Newman, 1979
            - Genus Pseudoacasta Nilsson-Cantell, 1930
            - Genus Tasmanobalanus Buckeridge, 1983
            - Genus †Paractinobalanus Carriol, 2008
            - Genus †Porobalanus Buckeridge, 2015
          - Subfamily Semibalaninae Newman & Ross, 1976
            - Genus Semibalanus Pilsbry, 1916
          - Subfamily Wanellinae Chan et al., 2021
            - Genus Wanella Anderson, 1993
        - Family Pyrgomatidae Gray, 1825
          - Subfamily Ceratoconchinae Newman & Ross, 1976
            - Genus Ceratoconcha Kramberger-Gorjanovic, 1889
            - Genus †Eoceratoconcha Newman & Ladd, 1974
          - Subfamily Megatrematinae Holthuis, 1982
            - Genus Adna Sowerby, 1823
            - Genus Megatrema Sowerby, 1823
            - Genus Memagreta Ross & Pitombo, 2002
            - Genus Pyrgomina Baluk & Radwanski, 1967
          - Subfamily Pyrgomatinae Gray, 1825
            - Genus Ahoekia Ross & Newman, 1995
            - Genus Arossella Anderson, 1993
            - Genus Australhoekia Ross & Newman, 2000
            - Genus Cantellius Ross & Newman, 1973
            - Genus Cionophorus Ross & Newman, 2001
            - Genus Creusia Leach, 1817
            - Genus Darwiniella Anderson, 1992
            - Genus Eohoekia Ross & Newman, 1995
            - Genus Galkinius Perreault, 2014
            - Genus Hiroa Ross & Newman, 1973
            - Genus Hoekia Ross & Newman, 1973
            - Genus Neopyrgoma Ross & Newman, 2002
            - Genus Neotrevathana Ross, 1999
            - Genus Nobia Sowerby, 1839
            - Genus Parahoekia Ross & Newman, 1995
            - Genus Pyrgoma Leach, 1817
            - Genus Pyrgopsella Zullo, 1967
            - Genus Pyrgospongia Achituv & Simon-Blecher, 2006
            - Genus Savignium Leach, 1825
            - Genus Trevathana Anderson, 1992
      - Superfamily Chthamaloidea Darwin, 1854
        - Family Catophragmidae Utinomi, 1968
          - Genus Catolasmus Ross & Newman, 2001
          - Genus Catomerus Pilsbry, 1916
          - Genus Catophragmus Sowerby, 1826
        - Family Chionelasmatidae Buckeridge, 1983
          - Genus Chionelasmus Pilsbry, 1911
          - Genus Eochionelasmus Yamaguchi, 1990
        - Family Chthamalidae Darwin, 1854
          - Genus Caudoeuraphia Poltarukha, 1997
          - Genus Chamaesipho Darwin, 1854
          - Genus Chinochthamalus Foster, 1980
          - Genus Chthamalus Ranzani, 1817
          - Genus Euraphia Conrad, 1837
          - Genus Hexechamaesipho Poltarukha, 1996
          - Genus Jehlius Ross, 1971
          - Genus Microeuraphia Poltarukha, 1997
          - Genus Nesochthamalus Foster & Newman, 1987
          - Genus Notochthamalus Foster & Newman, 1987
          - Genus Octomeris Sowerby, 1825
          - Genus Pseudoeuraphia Poltarukha, 2000
          - Genus Rehderella Foster & Newman, 1987
          - Genus Tetrachthamalus Newman, 1967
        - Family Pachylasmatidae Utinomi, 1968
          - Subfamily Eolasmatinae Buckeridge, 1983
            - Genus Eolasma Buckeridge, 1983
            - Genus Neoeolasma Gale, 2020
          - Subfamily Metalasmatinae Jones, 2000
            - Genus Metalasma Jones, 2000
          - Subfamily Pachylasmatinae Utinomi, 1968
            - Genus Atetrapachylasma Newman & Jones, 2011
            - Genus Eurylasma Jones, 2000
            - Genus Eutomolasma Jones, 2000
            - Genus Microlasma Jones, 2000
            - Genus Pachylasma Darwin, 1854
            - Genus Pseudoctomeris Poltarukha, 1996
            - Genus Tetrapachylasma Foster, 1988
        - Family Waikalasmatidae Ross & Newman, 2001
          - Genus Waikalasma Buckeridge, 1983
      - Superfamily Coronuloidea Leach, 1817
        - Family Austrobalanidae Newman & Ross, 1976
          - Genus Austrobalanus Pilsbry, 1916
        - Family Bathylasmatidae Newman & Ross, 1971
          - Subfamily Bathylasmatinae Newman & Ross, 1971
            - Genus Bathylasma Newman & Ross, 1971
            - Genus Mesolasma Foster, 1981
            - Genus Tetrachaelasma Newman & Ross, 1971
            - Genus †Tessarelasma Withers, 1936
          - Subfamily Hexelasmatinae Newman & Ross, 1976
            - Genus Hexelasma Hoek, 1913
        - Family Chelonibiidae Pilsbry, 1916
          - Subfamily Chelonibiinae Pilsbry, 1916
            - Genus Chelonibia Leach, 1817
            - Genus Stephanolepas Fischer, 1886
          - Subfamily †Protochelonibiinae Harzhauser & Newman, 2011
            - Genus †Protochelonibia Harzhauser & Newman, 2011
        - Family Coronulidae Leach, 1817
          - Genus Cetolepas Zullo, 1969
          - Genus Cetopirus Ranzani, 1817
          - Genus Chelolepas Ross & Frick, 2007
          - Genus Coronula Lamarck, 1802
          - Genus Cryptolepas Dall, 1872
          - Genus Cylindrolepas Pilsbry, 1916
          - Genus Platylepas Gray, 1825
          - Genus Stomatolepas Pilsbry, 1910
          - Genus Tubicinella Lamarck, 1802
          - Genus Xenobalanus Steenstrup, 1852
          - Genus †Emersonius Ross, 1967
        - Family Tetraclitidae Gruvel, 1903
          - Genus Astroclita Ren & Liu, 1979
          - Genus Epopella Ross, 1970
          - Genus Lissaclita Gomez-Daglio & Van Syoc, 2006
          - Genus Neonrosella Jones, 2010
          - Genus Newmanella Ross, 1969
          - Genus Tesseropora Pilsbry, 1916
          - Genus Tetraclita Schumacher, 1817
          - Genus Tetraclitella Hiro, 1939
          - Genus Yamaguchiella Ross & Perreault, 1999
          - Genus †Tesseroplax Ross, 1969
      - Superfamily Elminioidea Chan et al., 2021
        - Family Elminiidae Foster, 1982
          - Genus Austrominius Buckeridge, 1983
          - Genus Elminius Leach, 1825
          - Genus Hexaminius Foster, 1982
          - Genus Protelminius Buckeridge & Newman, 2010
          - Genus †Matellonius Buckeridge, 1983
      - Superfamily †Pachydiadematoidea Chan et al., 2021
        - Family †Pachydiadematidae Chan et al., 2021
          - Genus †Pachydiadema Withers, 1935
    - Order Calanticomorpha Chan et al., 2021
      - Family Calanticidae Zevina, 1978
        - Genus Aurivillialepas Newman, 1980
        - Genus Calantica Gray, 1825
        - Genus Crosnieriella Jones, 1998
        - Genus Euscalpellum Hoek, 1907
        - Genus Gruvelialepas Newman, 1980
        - Genus Newmanilepas Zevina & Yakhontova, 1987
        - Genus Paracalantica (Utinomi, 1949)
        - Genus Pisiscalpellum Utinomi, 1958
        - Genus Scillaelepas Seguenza, 1872
        - Genus Smilium Gray, 1825
        - Genus †Pachyscalpellum Buckeridge, 1991
        - Genus †Zeascalpellum Buckeridge, 1983
      - Family †Cretiscalpellidae Buckeridge, 1983
        - Genus †Cretiscalpellum Withers, 1922
        - Genus †Jagtscalpellum Gale, 2020
        - Genus †Striascalpellum Gale, 2020
        - Genus †Witherscalpellum Gale, 2020
      - Family †Titanolepadidae Gale & Sørensen, 2015
        - Genus †Ivoelepas Gale & Sørensen, 2015
        - Genus †Levelepas Gale & Sørensen, 2015
        - Genus †Titanolepas Withers, 1913
    - Order Pollicipedomorpha Chan et al., 2021
      - Family Lithotryidae Gruvel, 1905
        - Genus Lithotrya Sowerby, 1822
      - Family Pollicipedidae Leach, 1817
        - Genus Anelasma Darwin, 1852
        - Genus Capitulum Gray, 1825
        - Genus Pollicipes Leach, 1817
      - Family †Zeugmatolepadidae Newman, 1996
        - Subfamily †Martillepadinae Gale, 2014
          - Genus †Concinnalepas Gale, 2014
          - Genus †Etcheslepas Gale, 2014
          - Genus †Icenilepas Gale, 2014
          - Genus †Litholepas Nagler, Haug, Glenner & Buckeridge, 2017
          - Genus †Martillepas Gale, 2014
          - Genus †Subsecolepas Gale, 2020
          - Genus †Texaslepas Gale, 2020
        - Subfamily †Zeugmatolepadinae Newman, 1996
          - Genus †Aporolepas Withers, 1953
          - Genus †Tetrinus Hirt, 1992
          - Genus †Zeugmatolepas Withers, 1913
    - Order Scalpellomorpha Buckeridge & Newman, 2006
      - Superfamily Lepadoidea Chan et al., 2021
        - Family Heteralepadidae Nilsson-Cantell, 1921
          - Genus Alepas Rang, 1829
          - Genus Heteralepas Pilsbry, 1907
          - Genus Koleolepas Stebbing, 1900
          - Genus Paralepas Pilsbry, 1907
        - Family Lepadidae Darwin, 1852
          - Genus Conchoderma von Olfers, 1814
          - Genus Dosima Gray, 1825
          - Genus Hyalolepas Annandale, 1906
          - Genus Lepas Linnaeus, 1758
          - Genus †Pristinolepas Buckeridge, 1983
        - Family Malacolepadidae Hiro, 1937
          - Genus Arcalepas Jones & Morton, 2009
          - Genus Malacolepas Hiro, 1933
        - Family Poecilasmatidae Annandale, 1909
          - Genus Dianajonesia Koçak & Kemal, 2008
          - Genus Dichelaspis Darwin, 1852
          - Genus Glyptelasma Pilsbry, 1907
          - Genus Megalasma Hoek, 1883
          - Genus Microlepas Hoek, 1907
          - Genus Minyaspis Van Syoc & Dekelboum, 2011
          - Genus Octolasmis Gray, 1825
          - Genus Oxynaspis Darwin, 1852
          - Genus Pagurolepas Stubbings, 1940
          - Genus Poecilasma Darwin, 1852
          - Genus Rugilepas Grygier & Newman, 1991
          - Genus Scleraspis Van Syoc & Dekelboum, 2012
          - Genus Trilasmis Hinds, 1844
          - Genus †Archoxynaspis Van Syoc & Dekelboum, 2011
        - Family Rhizolepadidae Zevina, 1980
          - Genus Rhizolepas Day, 1939
      - Superfamily Neolepadoidea Chan et al., 2021
        - Family Neobrachylepadidae Newman & Yamaguchi, 1995
          - Genus Neobrachylepas Newman & Yamaguchi, 1995
        - Family Neolepadidae Yamaguchi, Newman & Hashimoto, 2004
          - Genus Ashinkailepas Yamaguchi, Newman & Hashimoto, 2004
          - Genus Leucolepas Southward & Jones, 2003
          - Genus Neolepas Newman, 1979
          - Genus Vulcanolepas Southward & Jones, 2003
          - Genus †Stipilepas Carriol, 2016
        - Family Neoverrucidae Newman, 1989 in Hessler & Newman, 1989
          - Genus Imbricaverruca Newman, 2000
          - Genus Neoverruca Newman in Hessler & Newman, 1989
        - Family Probathylepadidae Ren & Sha, 2015
          - Genus Probathylepas Ren & Sha, 2015
      - Superfamily Scalpelloidea Chan et al., 2021
        - Family Scalpellidae Pilsbry, 1907
          - Subfamily Amigdoscalpellinae Gale, 2015
            - Genus Amigdoscalpellum Zevina, 1978
            - Genus Catherinum Zevina, 1978
            - Genus Weltnerium Zevina, 1978
          - Subfamily Brochiinae Zevina, 1978
            - Genus Australscalpellum Newman & Ross, 1971
            - Genus Brochia Newman & Ross, 1971
          - Subfamily Meroscalpellinae Zevina, 1978
            - Genus Abathescalpellum Newman & Ross, 1971
            - Genus Alcockianum Zevina, 1978
            - Genus Annandaleum Newman & Ross, 1971
            - Genus Gymnoscalpellum Newman & Ross, 1971
            - Genus Hamatoscalpellum Zevina, 1978
            - Genus Litoscalpellum Newman & Ross, 1971
            - Genus Meroscalpellum Zevina, 1978
            - Genus Neoscalpellum Pilsbry, 1907
          - Subfamily Scalpellinae Pilsbry, 1907
            - Genus Arcoscalpellum Hoek, 1907
            - Genus Diotascalpellum Gale, 2015
            - Genus Graviscalpellum Foster, 1980
            - Genus Regioscalpellum Gale, 2015
            - Genus Scalpellum Leach, 1818
            - Genus Zevinaella Shalaeva & Newman, 2016
            - Genus †Arcuatoscalpellum Gale, 2015
            - Genus †Jaegerscalpellum Gale, 2019
          - Subfamily Scalpellopsinae Zevina, 1978
            - Genus Scalpellopsis Broch, 1921
          - Subfamily Virgiscalpellinae Gale, 2020
            - Genus †Collinslepas Gale, 2020
            - Genus †Virgilepas Gale, 2020
            - Genus †Virgiscalpellum Withers, 1935
        - Family †Proverrucidae Newman, 1989 in Hessler & Newman, 1989
          - Genus †Proverruca Withers, 1914
    - Order Verrucomorpha Pilsbry, 1916
      - Family Verrucidae Darwin, 1854
        - Genus Altiverruca Pilsbry, 1916
        - Genus Brochiverruca Zevina, 1993
        - Genus Cameraverruca Pilsbry, 1916
        - Genus Costatoverruca Young, 1998
        - Genus Cristallinaverruca Young, 2002
        - Genus Gibbosaverruca Young, 2002
        - Genus Globuloverruca Young, 2004
        - Genus Metaverruca Pilsbry, 1916
        - Genus Newmaniverruca Young, 1998
        - Genus Rostratoverruca Broch, 1922
        - Genus Spongoverruca Zevina, 1987
        - Genus Verruca Schumacher, 1817
        - Genus †Priscoverruca Gale, 2014
        - Genus †Youngiverruca Gale, 2014
      - Family †Eoverrucidae Gale, 2020
        - Genus †Eoverruca Withers, 1935
    - Order †Archaeolepadomorpha Chan et al., 2021
      - Family †Archaeolepadidae Gale, 2019
        - Genus †Archaeolepas von Zittel, 1884
        - Genus †Loriolepas Gale, 2015
      - Family †Myolepadidae Gale, 2015 in Gale & Sørensen, 2015
        - Genus †Bosquetlepas Gale & Sørensen, 2015
        - Genus †Myolepas Gale & Sørensen, 2015
      - Family †Stramentidae Withers, 1920
        - Subfamily †Loriculinae Gale, 2015
          - Genus †Blastolepas Drushchits & Zevina, 1969
          - Genus †Loriculina Dames, 1885
          - Genus †Metaloriculina Gale, 2015
        - Subfamily †Stramentinae Withers, 1920
          - Genus †Angulatergum Hauschke, 1994
          - Genus †Leweslepas Gale, 2015
          - Genus †Parastramentum Gale, 2015
          - Genus †Stramentum Logan, 1897
    - Order †Brachylepadomorpha Withers, 1923
      - Family †Brachylepadidae Woodward, 1901
        - Genus †Brachylepas Woodward, 1901
        - Genus †Epibrachylepas Gale, 2014
        - Genus †Fallaxlepas Gale, 2020
        - Genus †Faxelepas Gale, 2014
        - Genus †Parabrachylepas Gale, 2014
        - Genus †Pedupycnolepas Gale, 2014
        - Genus †Pycnolepas Withers, 1914
