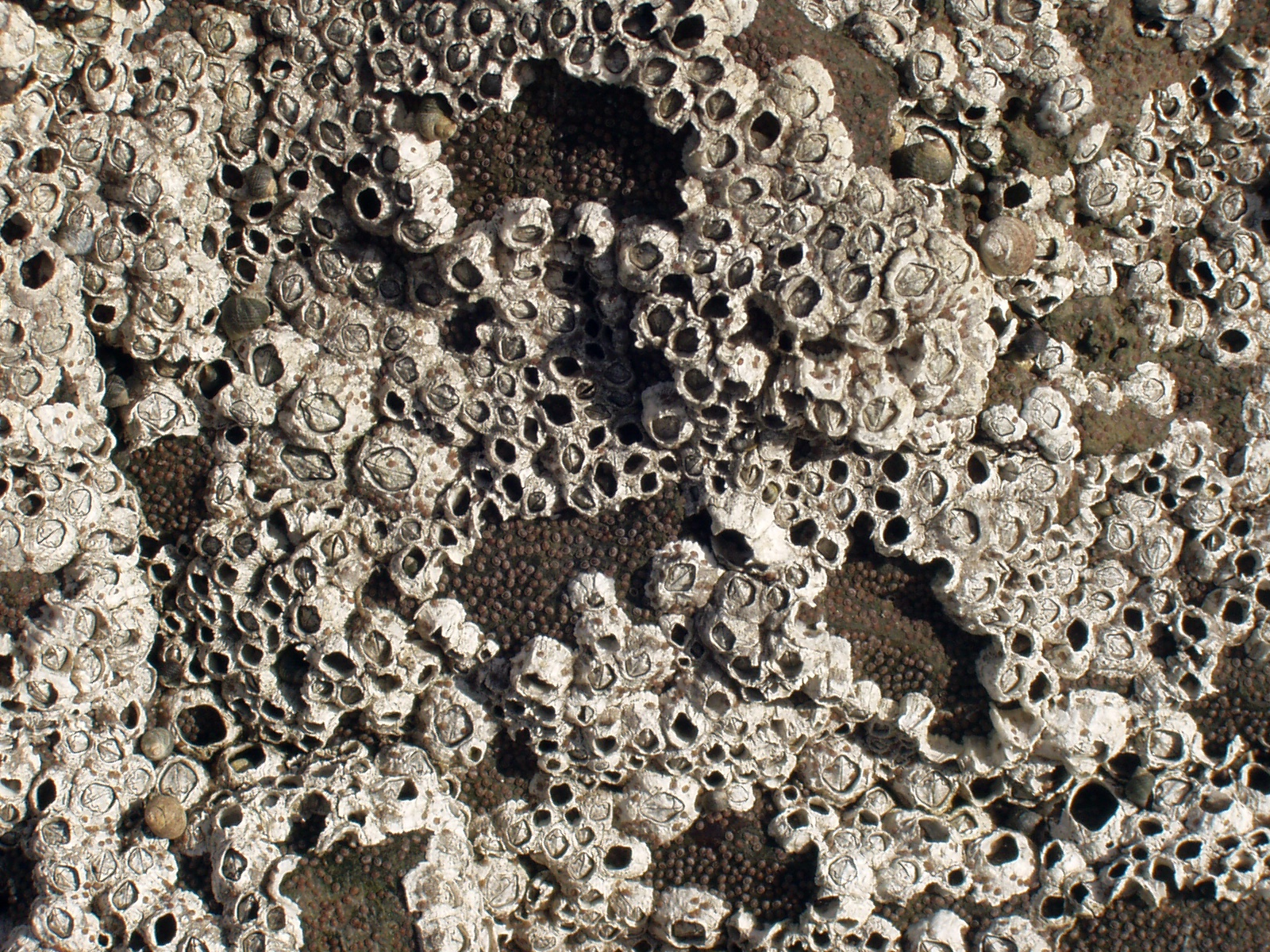
- Semibalanus balanoides

Scientific classification
- Domain: Eukaryota
- Kingdom: Animalia
- Phylum: Arthropoda
- Class: Thecostraca
- Subclass: Cirripedia
- Infraclass: Thoracica; Darwin, 1854

Orders
- Balanomorpha Pilsbry, 1916; Calanticomorpha Chan et al., 2021; Iblomorpha Buckeridge & Newman, 2006; Pollicipedomorpha Chan et al., 2021; Scalpellomorpha Buckeridge & Newman, 2006; Verrucomorpha Pilsbry, 1916; † Archaeolepadomorpha Chan et al., 2021; † Brachylepadomorpha Withers, 1923; † Eolepadomorpha Chan et al., 2021

= Thoracica =

Infraclass of barnacles

Thoracica is an infraclass of crustaceans which contains the most familiar species of barnacles found on rocky coasts, such as Semibalanus balanoides and Chthamalus stellatus. They have six well-developed limbs, and may be either stalked or sessile. The carapace is heavily calcified. The group includes free-living and commensal species.

== Classification ==
This article follows Chan et al. (2021) and WoRMS in placing Thoracica as an infraclass of Thecostraca and in the following classification of thoracicans down to the level of family:

Infraclass Thoracica Darwin, 1854

Superorder Phosphatothoracica Gale, 2019

Order Iblomorpha Buckeridge & Newman, 2006

Family Iblidae Leach, 1825
Family Idioiblidae Buckeridge & Newman, 2006

Order †Eolepadomorpha Chan et al., 2021

Family †Eolepadidae Buckeridge, 1983
Family †Praelepadidae Chernyshev, 1930

Superorder Thoracicalcarea Gale, 2015

Order Balanomorpha Pilsbry, 1916

Superfamily Balanoidea Leach, 1817

Family Balanidae Leach, 1817
Family Pyrgomatidae Gray, 1825

Superfamily Chthamaloidea Darwin, 1854

Family Catophragmidae Utinomi, 1968
Family Chionelasmatidae Buckeridge, 1983
Family Chthamalidae Darwin, 1854
Family Pachylasmatidae Utinomi, 1968
Family Waikalasmatidae Ross & Newman, 2001

Superfamily Coronuloidea Leach, 1817

Family Austrobalanidae Newman & Ross, 1976
Family Bathylasmatidae Newman & Ross, 1971
Family Chelonibiidae Pilsbry, 1916
Family Coronulidae Leach, 1817
Family Tetraclitidae Gruvel, 1903

Superfamily Elminioidea Chan et al., 2021

Family Elminiidae Foster, 1982

Superfamily †Pachydiadematoidea Chan et al., 2021

Family †Pachydiadematidae Chan et al., 2021

Order Calanticomorpha Chan et al., 2021

Family Calanticidae Zevina, 1978
Family †Cretiscalpellidae Buckeridge, 1983
Family †Titanolepadidae Gale & Sørensen, 2015

Order Pollicipedomorpha Chan et al., 2021

Family Lithotryidae Gruvel, 1905
Family Pollicipedidae Leach, 1817
Family †Zeugmatolepadidae Newman, 1996

Order Scalpellomorpha Buckeridge & Newman, 2006

Superfamily Lepadoidea Chan et al., 2021

Family Heteralepadidae Nilsson-Cantell, 1921
Family Lepadidae Darwin, 1852
Family Malacolepadidae Hiro, 1937
Family Poecilasmatidae Annandale, 1909
Family Rhizolepadidae Zevina, 1980

Superfamily Neolepadoidea Chan et al., 2021

Family Neobrachylepadidae Newman & Yamaguchi, 1995
Family Neolepadidae Yamaguchi, Newman & Hashimoto, 2004
Family Neoverrucidae Newman, 1989 in Hessler & Newman, 1989
Family Probathylepadidae Ren & Sha, 2015

Superfamily Scalpelloidea Chan et al., 2021

Family Scalpellidae Pilsbry, 1907
Family †Proverrucidae Newman, 1989 in Hessler & Newman, 1989

Order Verrucomorpha Pilsbry, 1916

Family Verrucidae Darwin, 1854
Family †Eoverrucidae Gale, 2020

Order †Archaeolepadomorpha Chan et al., 2021

Family †Archaeolepadidae Gale, 2019
Family †Myolepadidae Gale, 2015 in Gale & Sørensen, 2015
Family †Stramentidae Withers, 1920

Order †Brachylepadomorpha Withers, 1923

Family †Brachylepadidae Woodward, 1901
