= Bathylasma alearum =

Scientific classification
- Domain: Eukaryota
- Kingdom: Animalia
- Phylum: Arthropoda
- Class: Thecostraca
- Subclass: Cirripedia
- Order: Balanomorpha
- Family: Bathylasmatidae
- Genus: Bathylasma
- Species: B. alearum

Binomial name
- Bathylasma alearum (Foster, 1978)

Synonyms
- Hexelasma alearum Foster, 1978

Species of barnacle

Bathylasma alearum is a species of barnacles in the Pachylasmatidae family. The species is androdioecious.
