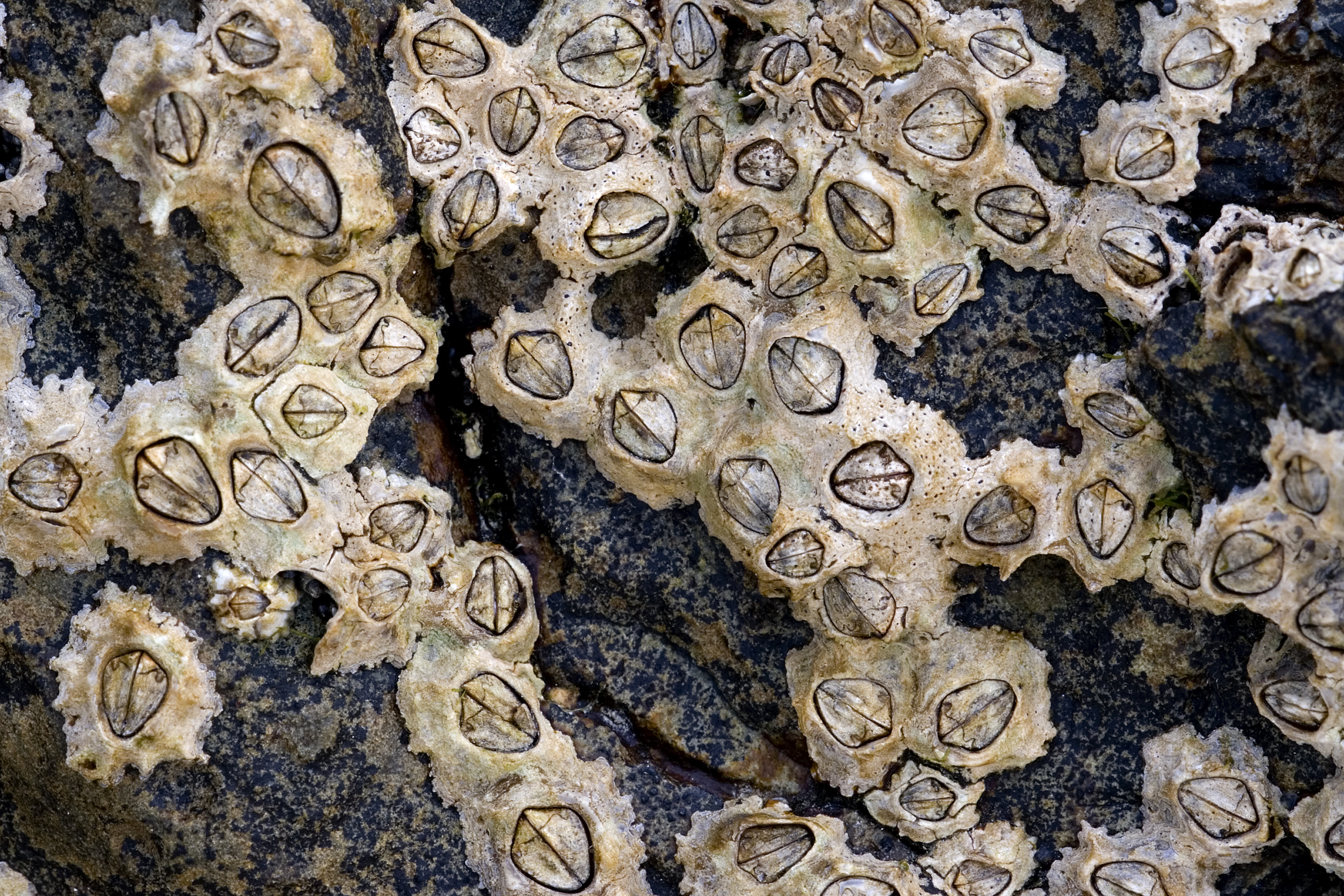
- Chthamalus stellatus

Scientific classification
- Kingdom: Animalia
- Phylum: Arthropoda
- Class: Thecostraca
- Subclass: Cirripedia
- Infraclass: Thoracica
- Superorder: Thoracicalcarea
- (unranked): Sessilia
- Order: Balanomorpha
- Superfamily: Chthamaloidea; Darwin, 1854

= Chthamaloidea =

Chthamaloidea Temporal range: Cretaceous–Recent

Superfamily of barnacles

The Chthamaloidea are a subdivision of Balanomorpha proposed by Newman and Ross to include barnacles with shell wall composed of rostrum, carina, and one to three pairs of latera, rarely supplemented with one or more whorls of basal imbricating plates. The rostrolatus enters the sheath, but rarely fuses with the rostrum, as in the three higher superfamilies. Shell plates are simple in construction, solid, and incorporate organic chitin between carbonate layers. Opercular plates are deeply interlocked, and in some genera, may become concrescent with age. Soft part morphology includes concave labrum without notch in the central part. Cirrus III more resembles Cirrus IV than II, or may be intermediate in structure. Caudal appendages present in some species.

== Environmental preferences and distribution ==
All living Chthamaloidea, and very sparsely known fossil occurrences inhabit surf zone/intertidal/subtidal littoral zone habitats. Geographically, chthamaloids may be found in all temperate and tropical seas, but highest diversity is found in tropics.

== Included families ==
These families belong to the superfamily Chthamaloidea:

- Catophragmidae Utinomi, 1968
- Chionelasmatidae Buckeridge, 1983
- Chthamalidae Darwin, 1854 (star barnacles)
- Pachylasmatidae Utinomi, 1968
- Waikalasmatidae Ross & Newman, 2001
