= Pseudoctomeris =

Scientific classification
- Domain: Eukaryota
- Kingdom: Animalia
- Phylum: Arthropoda
- Class: Thecostraca
- Subclass: Cirripedia
- Order: Balanomorpha
- Family: Pachylasmatidae
- Genus: Pseudoctomeris; Poltarukha, 1996
- Species: P. sulcata

Binomial name
- Pseudoctomeris sulcata (Nilsson-Cantell, 1932)

Synonyms
- Octomeris sulcata Nillson-Cantell, 1932

Genus of barnacles

Pseudoctomeris sulcatus is a species of barnacle, the only member of the genus Pseudoctomeris. It has an eight-plated shell wall with the rostrum partially fused with adjacent rostrolatera. The suture lines are visible only from the inside, thus in exterior view, the shell appears to have six wall plates. The basis is calcareous. Opercular plates are higher than wide, and not deeply articulated. These features and others show strong relationship to family Pachylasmatidae, and taxonomic revision of Pachylasmatidae has resulted in the transfer of Pseudoctomeris from Chthamalidae to Pachylasmatidae.

Diagnostic soft part characteristics, as described in Poltarukha, 2006 include a tridentate mandible and presence of a multi-jointed caudal appendage.

As Pseudoctomeris is monotypic, the genus characters are necessarily the same as those of P. sulcatus.

== Nomenclature and Synonymy ==
=== Pseudoctomeris ===
- Pseudoctomeris Poltarukha, 1996; (original description).
- Type Species: Octomeris sulcata Nilsson-Cantell, 1932; original designation by Poltarukha, 1996:988.

=== Pseudoctomeris sulcata ===
- Octomeris sulcata Nilsson-Cantell, 1932; (original description):
- Pseudoctomeris sulcata Poltarukha, 1996; (generic reassignment): 2006; (supplemental description, discussion).
- Type locality:
- Type specimens and repository:

== Habitat and geographic range ==
Pseudoctomeris is found in less agitated environments than most Chthamaloidea, preferring lower littoral to sublittoral habitats, on rocky shores.

Pseudoctomeris sulcatus range extends to South Japan, China, and Taiwan.
