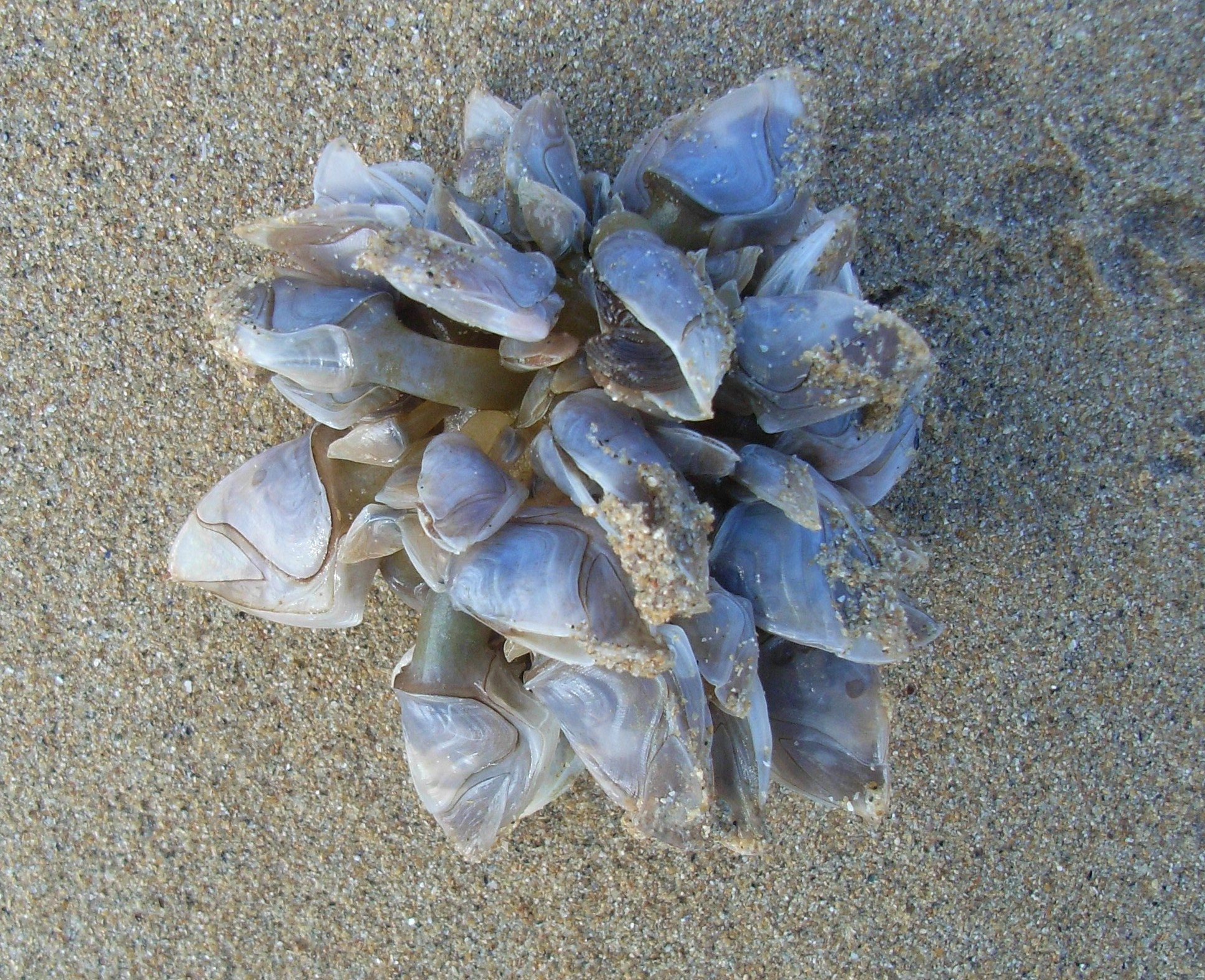
- Dosima fascicularis, Ireland

Scientific classification
- Kingdom: Animalia
- Phylum: Arthropoda
- Clade: Pancrustacea
- Class: Thecostraca
- Subclass: Cirripedia
- Superorder: Thoracicalcarea
- Order: Scalpellomorpha
- Superfamily: Lepadoidea
- Family: Lepadidae
- Genus: Dosima; Gray, 1825

= Dosima =

Genus of crustaceans

Dosima is a genus of goose barnacles in the family Lepadidae. There are at least two described species in Dosima.

== Species ==
These species belong to the genus Dosima:

- Dosima fascicularis (Ellis & Solander, 1786) (buoy barnacle)
- Dosima guanamuthui (Daniel, 1971)
