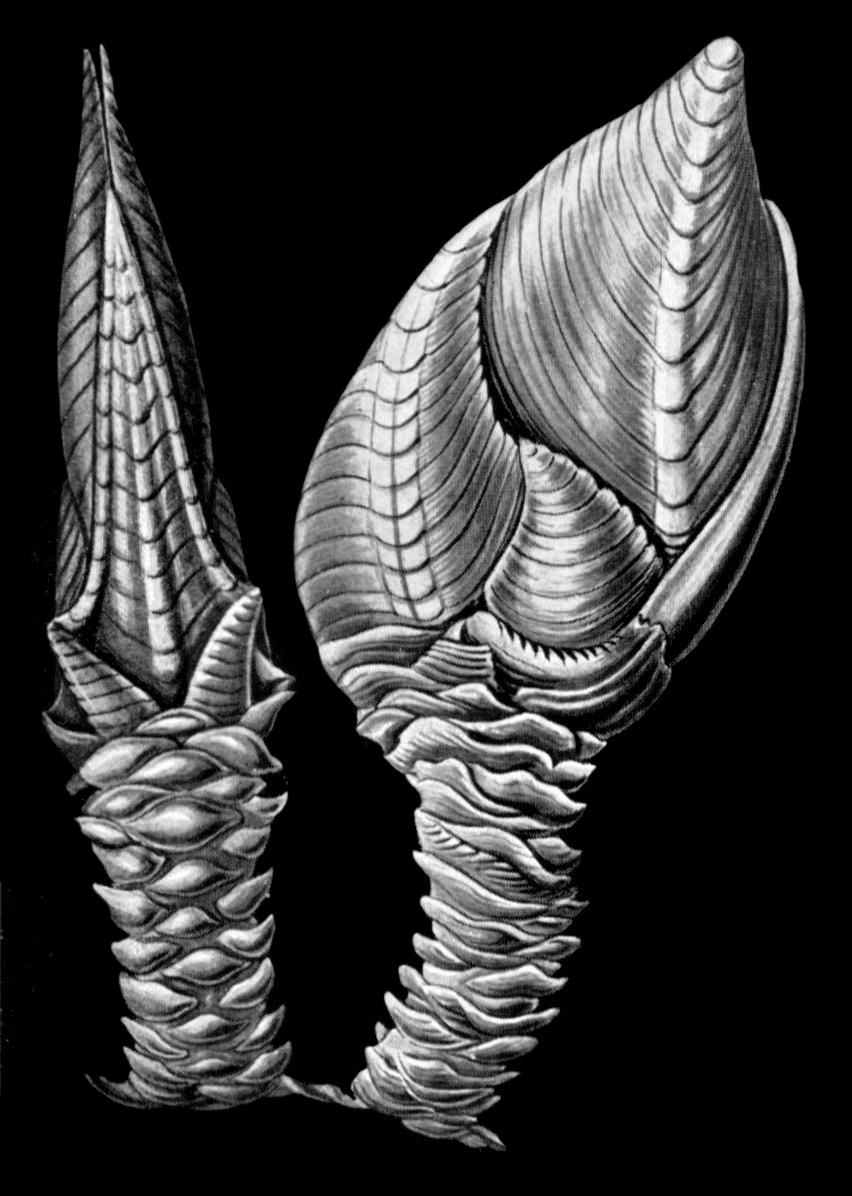
- Scalpellum eximium (=Arcoscalpellum michelottianum), drawn by Haeckel

Scientific classification
- Kingdom: Animalia
- Phylum: Arthropoda
- Clade: Pancrustacea
- Class: Thecostraca
- Subclass: Cirripedia
- Order: Scalpellomorpha
- Family: Scalpellidae
- Genus: Arcoscalpellum; Hoek, 1907

Type species
- Scalpellum (Arcoscalpellum) velutinum Hoek, 1883

Synonyms
- Holoscalpellum Pilsbry, 1907

= Arcoscalpellum =

Arcoscalpellum Temporal range: Albian–Recent

Genus of stalked barnacle

Arcoscalpellum is a large genus of stalked barnacles found worldwide. It is classified in the family Scalpellidae, subfamily Scalpellinae, and species are found from shallow waters down to depths of over 5 kilometres. The genus is well-represented in the fossil record as far back as the Cretaceous period.

== Taxonomy ==
Arcoscalpellum was first described in 1907 by Dutch zoologist Paulus P. C. Hoek as a section of the genus Scalpellum, in his account of barnacles found in an expedition to Sibolga. Hoek viewed the section, defined in part by a bowed carina, as less primitive than the species with a straight or angularly bent carina, which he put in the sections Protoscalpellum and Euscalpellum respectively. The type species is Scalpellum (Arcoscalpellum) velutinum by original designation, but that species is considered a junior subjective synonym of Arcoscalpellum michelottianum. The genus Holoscalpellum, described by Henry Augustus Pilsbry, is an exact synonym of Arcoscalpellum according to Pilsbry himself.

Arcoscalpellum was once used as a catch-all taxon for "most living and many fossil scalpellids" before being revised in the 1970s and 80s by Soviet zoologist Galina Zevina. In 2016, however, English paleontologist Andrew Scott Gale redefined the genus further, based on the morphology of the type species, as characteristics used for identification in a past paper were found by him to plesiomorphic for the Scalpellidae. Some species once placed in Arcoscalpellum have been moved into other genera, such as Graviscalpellum (created in 1980) and Regioscalpellum (created in 2016).

=== Phylogeny ===
The 2016 paper by Gale examined the phylogeny of the Scalpellidae, and found the family could be grouped "into two sharply demarcated clades". Arcoscalpellum was placed into the more basal, or "primitive" group, a redefinition of the subfamily Scalpellinae. Gale noted that the redefined Scalpellinae were still "technically paraphyletic" but argued that they "can be readily identified". The study was supported with morphological and molecular phylogenetic techniques, with the proposed groups matching genetic groups independently proposed the previous year. The Arcoscalpellum species sampled were the most derived of the Scalpellinae on the consensus tree. (The genus Diotascalpellum was the most basal scalpelline.)

Cladogram showing relationships of Arcoscalpellum

- Scalpellidae
  - Diotascalpellum
  - - Regioscalpellum
    - - Gaviscalpellum
      - - Arcoscalpellum michelottianum
        - - Arcoscalpellum sociabile
          - Subfamily Amigdoscalpellinae

After Gale 2016, p. 286

=== Species ===
The World Register of Marine Species lists the following species (94):

- Arcoscalpellum acicularum Newman & Ross, 1971
- Arcoscalpellum africanum (Hoek, 1883)
- Arcoscalpellum angularum Gan, Peng, Li & Wang, 2020
- Arcoscalpellum botellinae (Barnard, 1924)
- Arcoscalpellum bouveti (Nilsson-Cantell, 1939)
- Arcoscalpellum chiliense (Pilsbry, 1907)
- Arcoscalpellum ciliatum (Hoek, 1907)
- Arcoscalpellum compositum (Zevina, 1975)
- Arcoscalpellum discolor (Hoek, 1907)
- Arcoscalpellum dubium (Hoek, 1883)
- †Arcoscalpellum elongatum (Steenstrup, 1837)
- Arcoscalpellum epeeum Chan, Corbari, Rodriguez Moreno & Jones, 2014
- Arcoscalpellum eponkos Young, 1998
- Arcoscalpellum floccidum (Zevina, 1975)
- Arcoscalpellum forresti Rosell, 1989
- Arcoscalpellum galapaganum (Pilsbry, 1907)
- Arcoscalpellum gryllum Zevina, 1981
- Arcoscalpellum hawaiense (Pilsbry, 1907)
- Arcoscalpellum imbricotectum Newman & Ross, 1971
- Arcoscalpellum incisum (Aurivillius, 1898)
- Arcoscalpellum inum Zevina, 1981
- Arcoscalpellum kamenskae Zevina, 1990
- Arcoscalpellum longicarinatum (Pilsbry, 1907)
- Arcoscalpellum mamillatum (Aurivillius, 1898)
- Arcoscalpellum mendeleevi Zevina, 1981
- Arcoscalpellum michelottianum (Seguenza, 1876)
- Arcoscalpellum mironovi Zevina, 1981
- Arcoscalpellum orkneyi Zevina, 1993
- Arcoscalpellum pentagonum (Nilsson-Cantell, 1955)
- Arcoscalpellum pertosum Foster, 1978
- Arcoscalpellum phrygianum (Broch, 1953)
- Arcoscalpellum portoricanum (Pilsbry, 1907)
- Arcoscalpellum pseudoaurivilli Pilsbry, 1907
- Arcoscalpellum radiatum Rao & Newman, 1972
- †Arcoscalpellum renevieri (Mayer & Gümbel) in Gümbel, 1861
- Arcoscalpellum reni Young, 2007
- †Arcoscalpellum scaniensis Gale & Sørensen, 2015
- Arcoscalpellum sculptum (Hoek, 1907)
- Arcoscalpellum sergi (Zevina, 1974)
- Arcoscalpellum sociabile (Annandale, 1905)
- Arcoscalpellum triangulare (Hoek, 1883)
- Arcoscalpellum tritonis (Hoek, 1883)
- Arcoscalpellum truncatum (Hoek, 1883)
- Arcoscalpellum utinomi Newman & Ross, 1971
- Arcoscalpellum woodmasoni (Annandale, 1906)
- Arcoscalpellum youngi Chan, 2009

== Habitat, distribution, and fossil record ==
The genus Arcoscalpellum has a worldwide (cosmopolitan) distribution, being found in every area of the oceans except the Arctic. They live on substrates from 5250 to 50 m below sea level, or from the abyssal to the epipelagic zones. The Global Biodiversity Information Facility (GBIF) includes observations from the coast of every continent, and records individuals from Greenland to Antarctica. Records in the Ocean Biodiversity Information System heavily tilt towards warm, high-salinity environments, and the largest number of records come from the ranges of 300–400 and 1000–2000 metres below sea level, with only eight records in the 4000–5000 range.

A number of Arcoscapellum species are known from the fossil record, dating as far back as the Cretaceous. The oldest fossils registered in The Paleobiology Database are A. gaultinum and A. lineatum from the English Upper Albian, in the early Cretaceous. Other Arcoscarpellum fossils have been found in the United States, central Europe, and Russia.

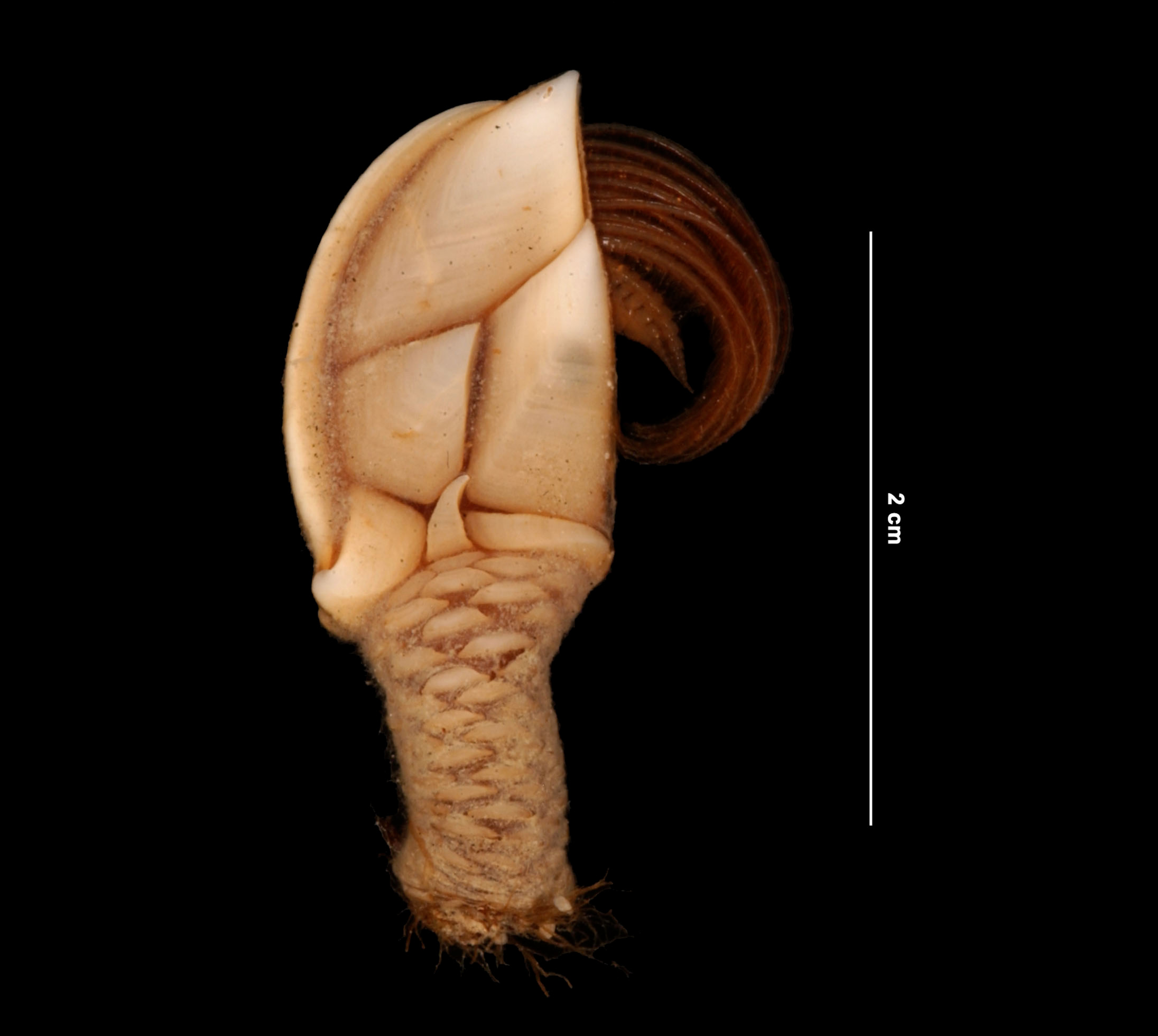
Arcoscalpellum portoricanum subsp. intonsum, specimen preserved in alcohol. Note the extended cirri.

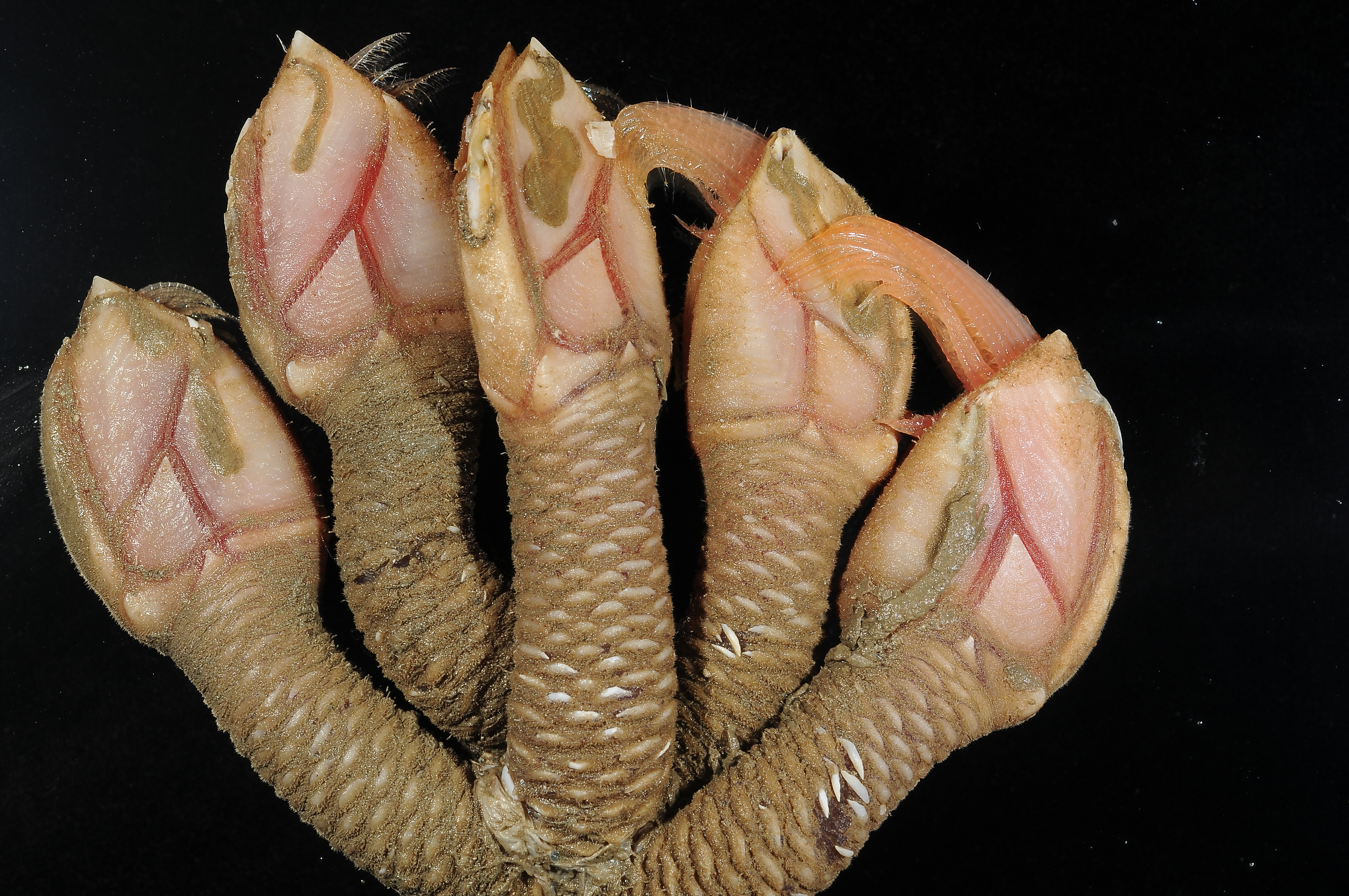
Clump of preserved Arcoscalpellum michelottianum.

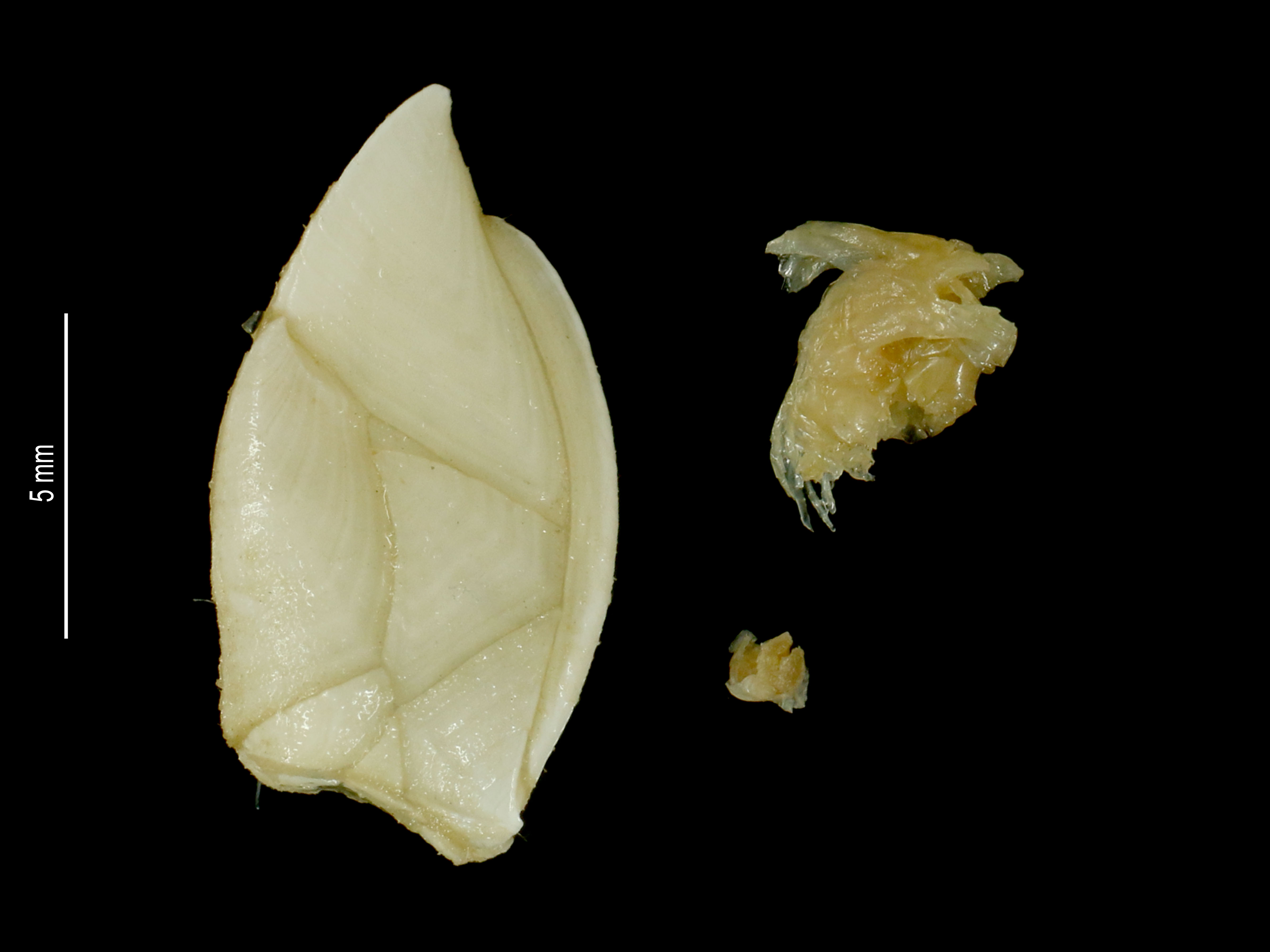
Preserved Arcoscalpellum incisum (shell on left)

== Bibliography ==
- Gale, Andrew Scott (25 Jan 2016). "Phylogeny of the deep‐sea cirripede family Scalpellidae (Crustacea, Thoracica) based on shell capitular plate morphology". Zoological Journal of the Linnean Society. 176 (2): 266–304. doi:10.1111/zoj.12321. PMC 7165668.
