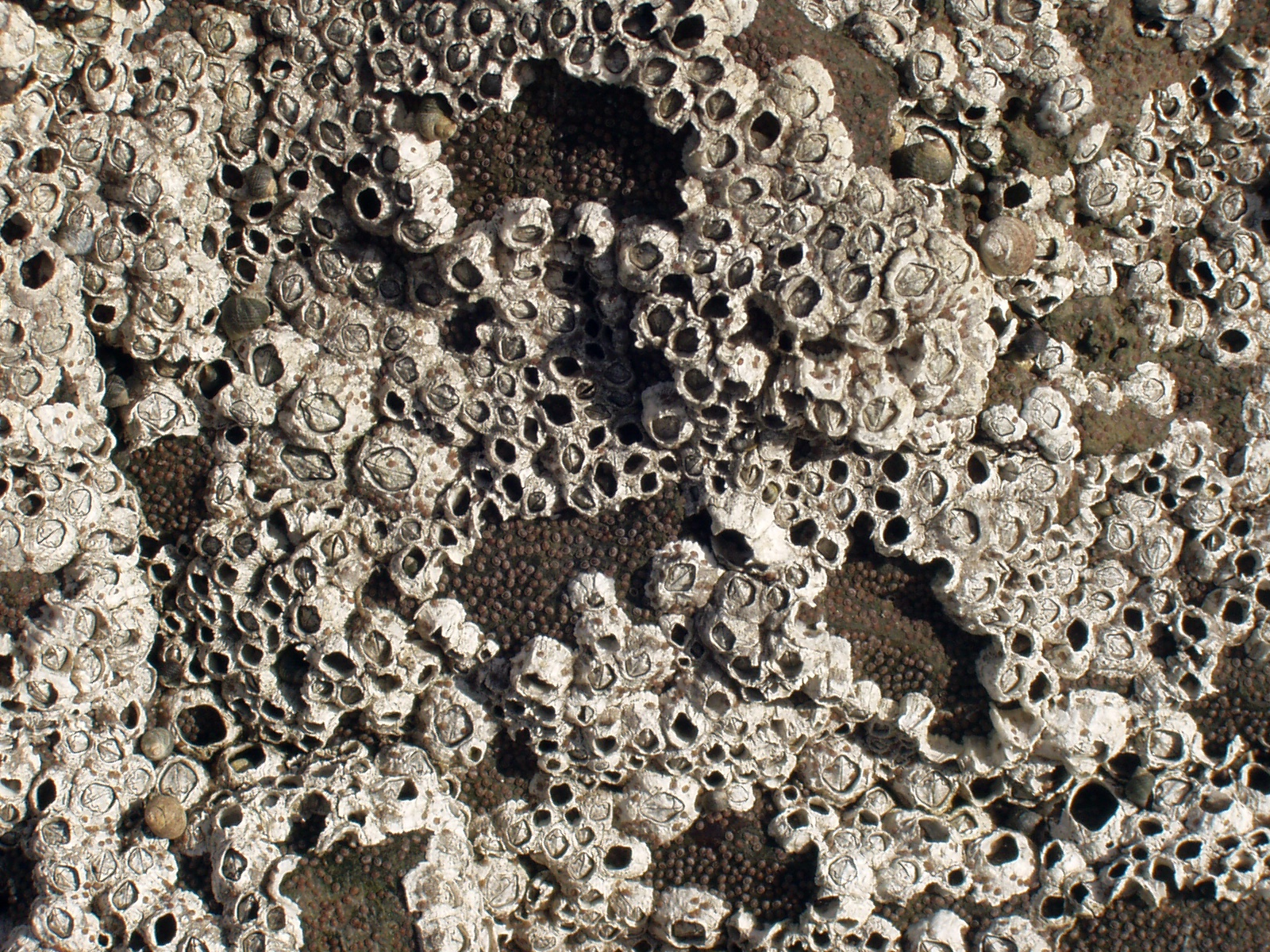
- Semibalanus balanoides

Scientific classification
- Kingdom: Animalia
- Phylum: Arthropoda
- Clade: Pancrustacea
- Class: Thecostraca
- Subclass: Cirripedia
- Superorder: Thoracicalcarea
- (unranked): Sessilia; Lamarck, 1818

Orders
- Balanomorpha; Verrucomorpha

= Sessilia =

Order of barnacles

Sessilia is an unranked clade of barnacles, comprising the barnacles without stalks, or acorn barnacles. They form a monophyletic group and are probably derived from stalked or goose barnacles. Sessilia is divided into two orders. The Verrucomorpha contain two families, Verrucidae and Neoverrucidae, and the remaining 14 families are in the order Balanomorpha.
