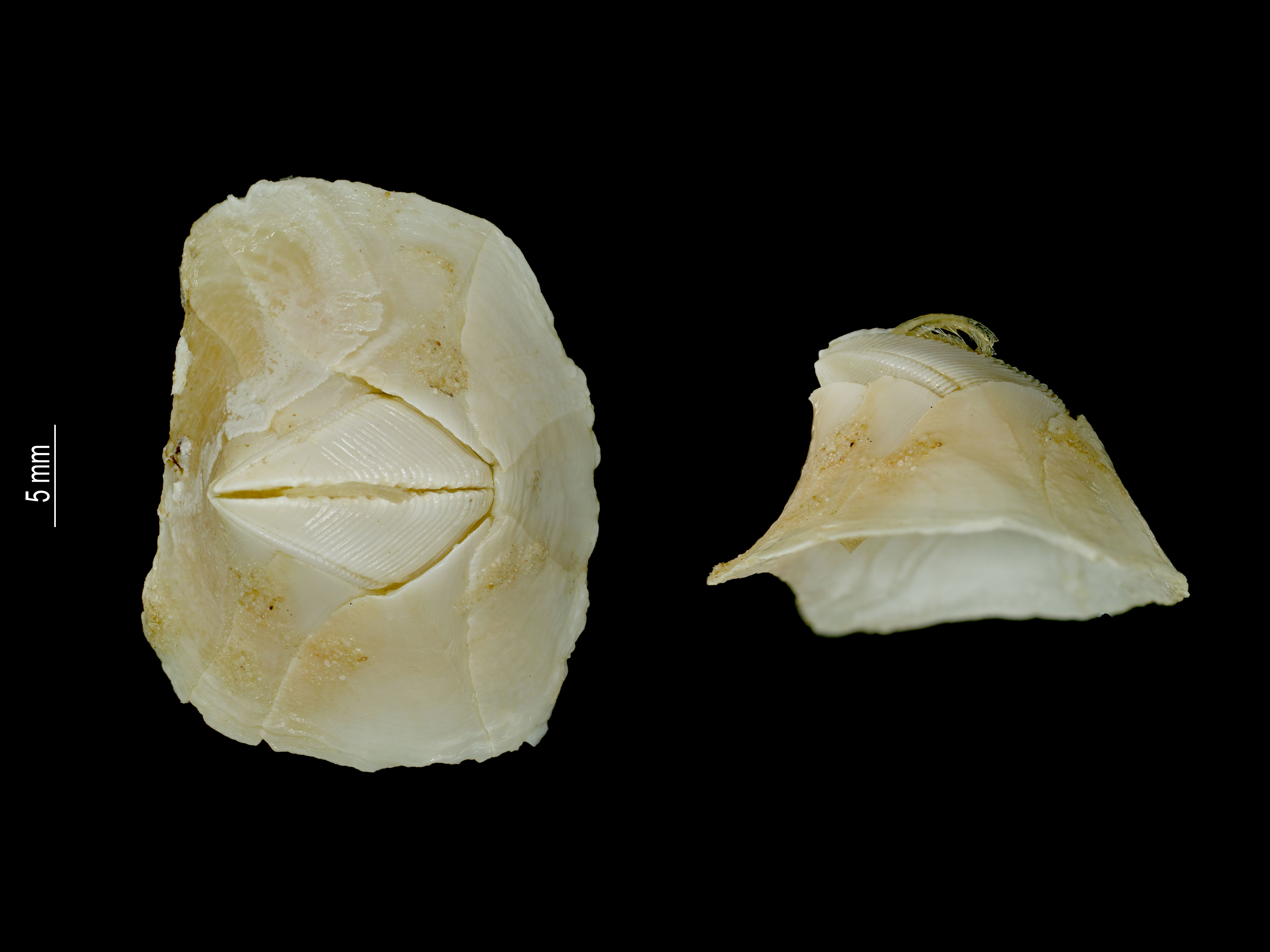
- Eutomolasma orbiculatum, South Pacific

Scientific classification
- Kingdom: Animalia
- Phylum: Arthropoda
- Class: Thecostraca
- Subclass: Cirripedia
- Order: Balanomorpha
- Family: Pachylasmatidae
- Subfamily: Pachylasmatinae
- Genus: Eutomolasma; Jones, 2000

= Eutomolasma =

Genus of crustaceans

Eutomolasma is a genus of symmetrical sessile barnacles in the family Pachylasmatidae. There are at least four described species in Eutomolasma.

== Species ==
These species belong to the genus Eutomolasma:

- Eutomolasma chinense (Pilsbry, 1912)
- Eutomolasma japonicum (Hiro, 1933)
- Eutomolasma maclaughlinae Jones, 2000
- Eutomolasma orbiculatum Jones, 2000
