= Bathylasma =

Scientific classification
- Domain: Eukaryota
- Kingdom: Animalia
- Phylum: Arthropoda
- Class: Thecostraca
- Subclass: Cirripedia
- Order: Balanomorpha
- Family: Bathylasmatidae
- Subfamily: Bathylasmatinae
- Genus: Bathylasma; Newman & Ross 1971

Genus of crustaceans

Bathylasma is a genus of barnacles.

== Species ==
Species in this genus include.

- Bathylasma alearum
- Bathylasma aucklandicum
- Bathylasma chilense
- Bathylasma corolliforme
- Bathylasma hirsutum
- Bathylasma rangatira
