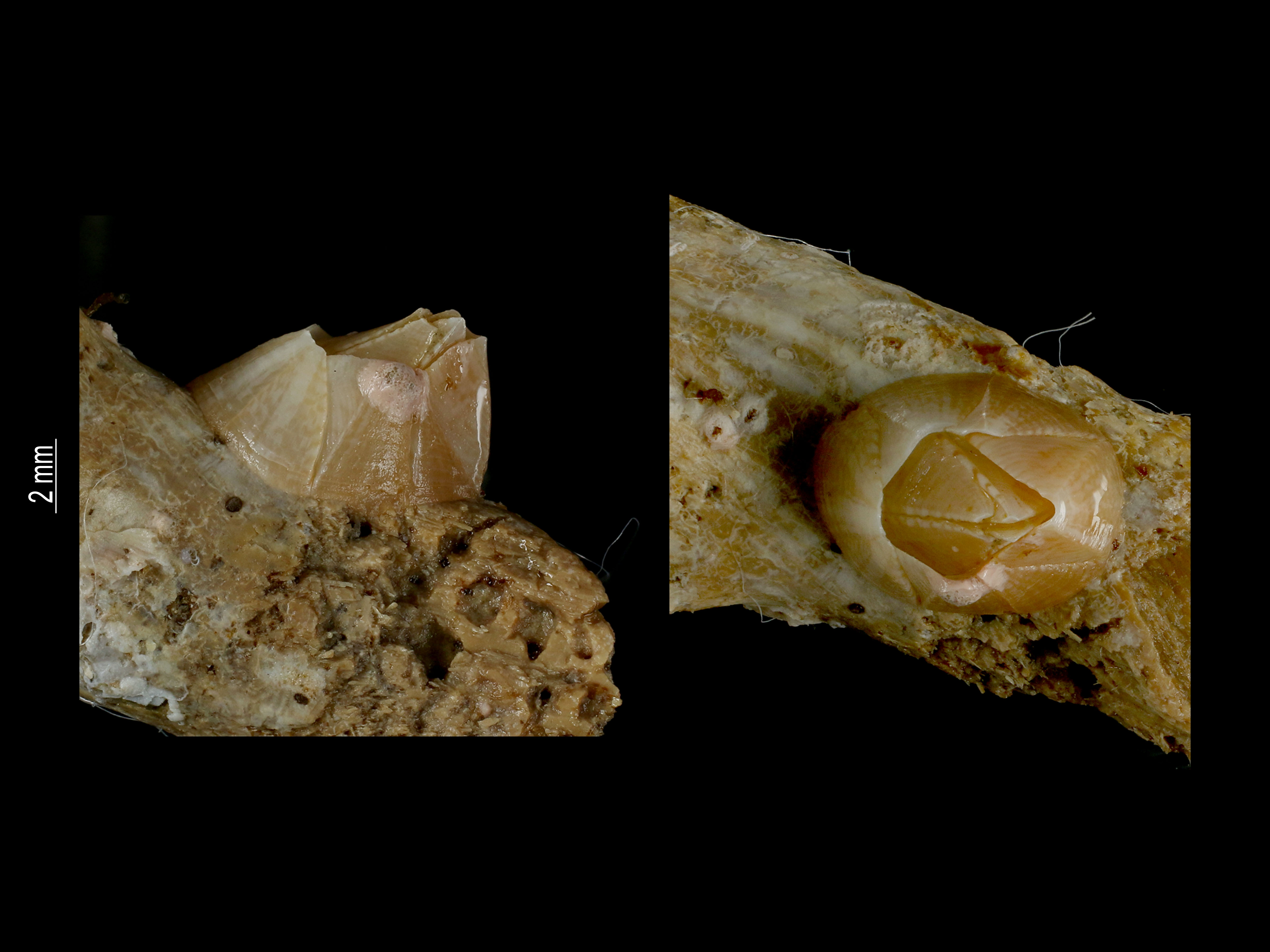
- Pachylasma laeviscutum, South Pacific

Scientific classification
- Kingdom: Animalia
- Phylum: Arthropoda
- Class: Thecostraca
- Subclass: Cirripedia
- Order: Balanomorpha
- Family: Pachylasmatidae
- Subfamily: Pachylasmatinae
- Genus: Pachylasma; Darwin, 1854

= Pachylasma =

Genus of crustaceans

Pachylasma is a genus of symmetrical sessile barnacles in the family Pachylasmatidae. There are about eight described species in Pachylasma.

== Species ==
These species belong to the genus Pachylasma:

- Pachylasma bacum Jones, 2000
- Pachylasma darwinianum Pilsbry, 1912
- Pachylasma ecaudatum Hiro, 1939
- Pachylasma giganteum (Philippi, 1836)
- Pachylasma integrirostrum Broch, 1931
- Pachylasma laeviscutum Jones, 2000
- Pachylasma ovatum Jones, 2000
- Pachylasma scutistriata Broch, 1922
