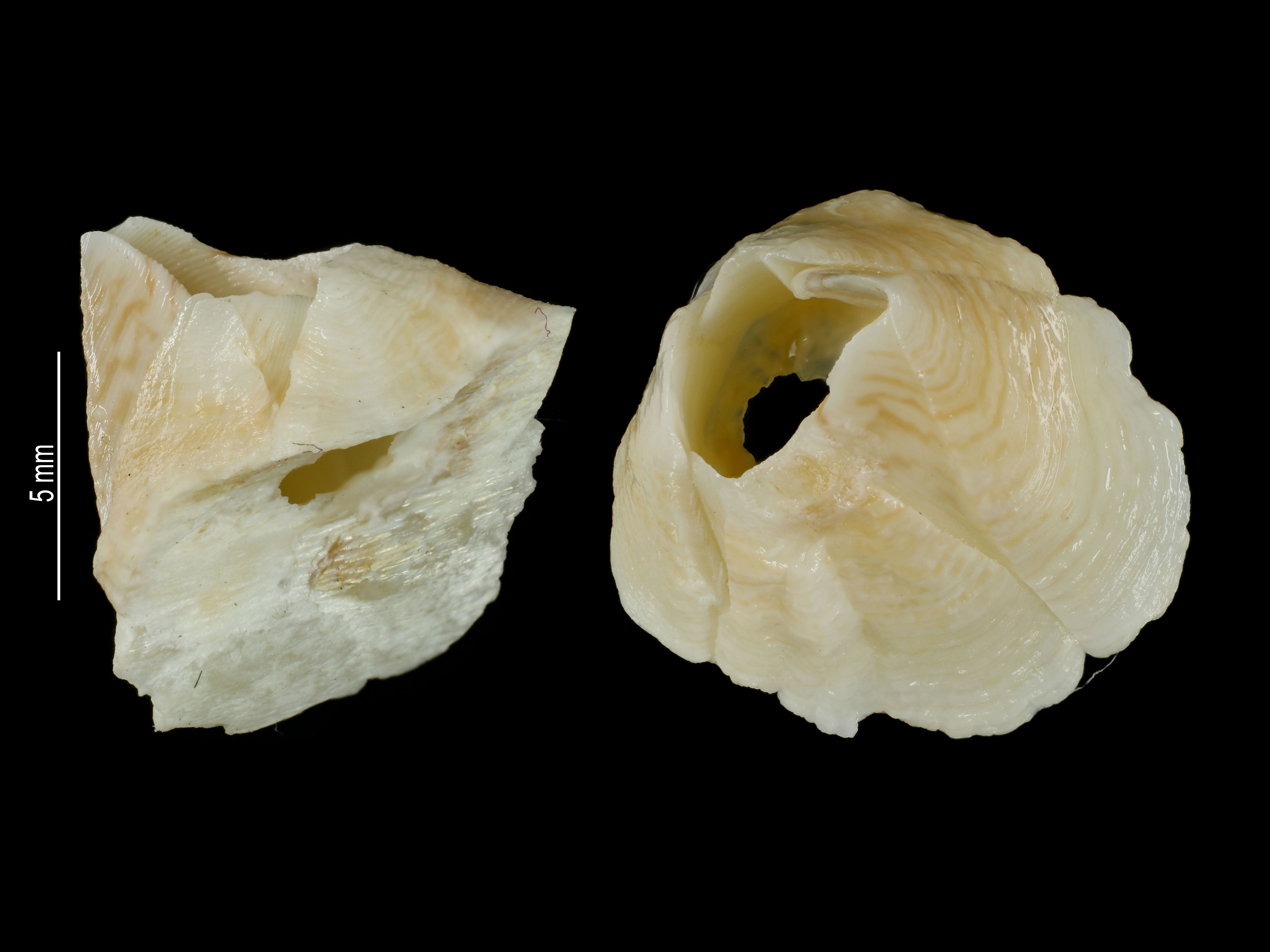
- Tetrapachylasma arcuatum, South Pacific

Scientific classification
- Kingdom: Animalia
- Phylum: Arthropoda
- Class: Thecostraca
- Subclass: Cirripedia
- Order: Balanomorpha
- Family: Pachylasmatidae
- Subfamily: Pachylasmatinae
- Genus: Tetrapachylasma; Foster, 1988

= Tetrapachylasma =

Genus of crustaceans

Tetrapachylasma is a genus of symmetrical sessile barnacles in the family Pachylasmatidae. There are about five described species in Tetrapachylasma.

== Species ==
These species belong to the genus Tetrapachylasma:

- Tetrapachylasma arcuatum Jones, 2000
- Tetrapachylasma aurantiacum (Darwin, 1854)
- Tetrapachylasma ferrugomaculosa (Jones, 1993)
- Tetrapachylasma ornatum Jones, 2000
- Tetrapachylasma trigonum Foster, 1988
