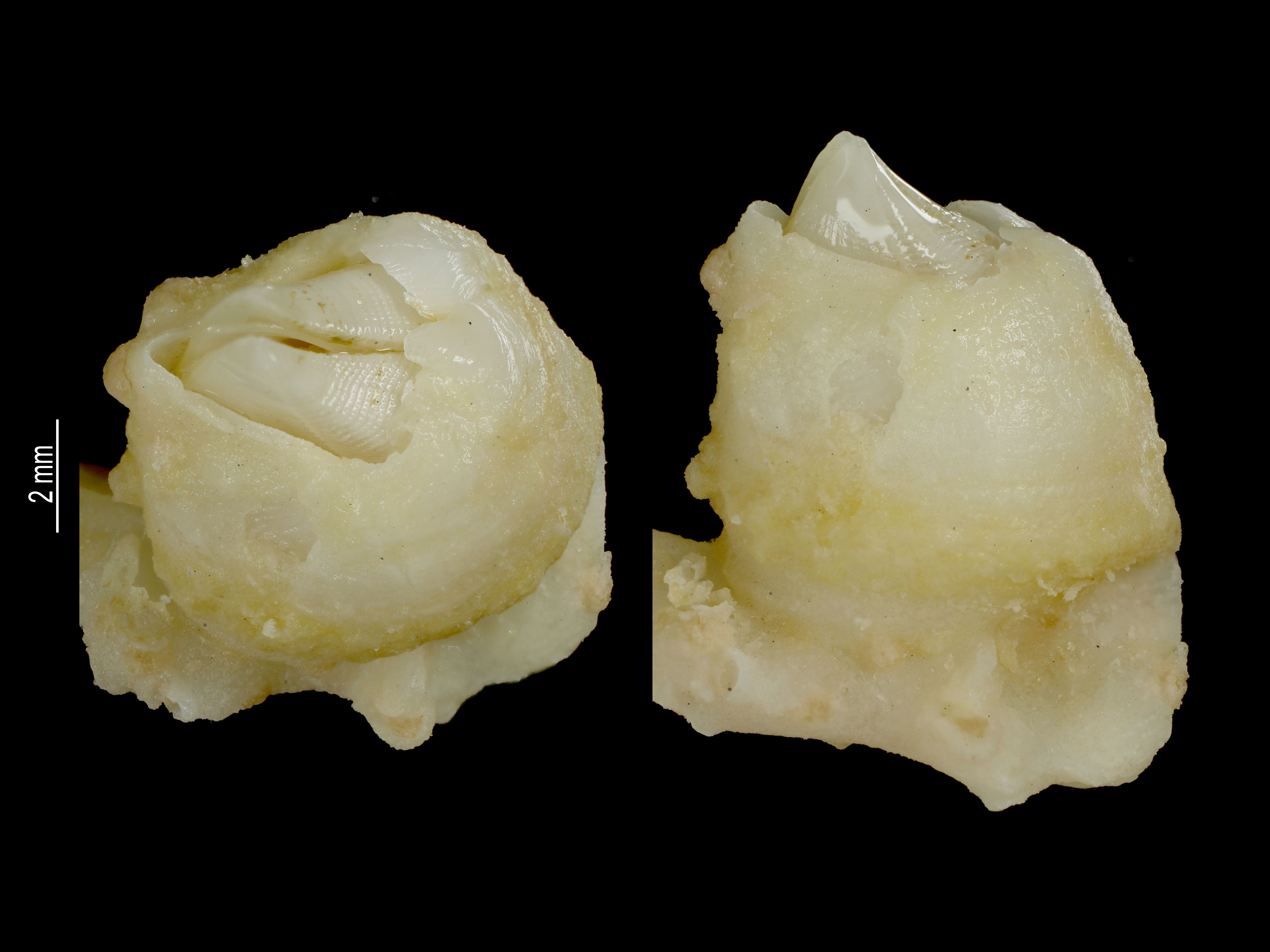
- Eurylasma pyramidale, South Pacific

Scientific classification
- Kingdom: Animalia
- Phylum: Arthropoda
- Class: Thecostraca
- Subclass: Cirripedia
- Order: Balanomorpha
- Family: Pachylasmatidae
- Subfamily: Pachylasmatinae
- Genus: Eurylasma; Jones, 2000

= Eurylasma =

Genus of crustaceans

Eurylasma is a genus of symmetrical sessile barnacles in the family Pachylasmatidae. There are at least three described species in Eurylasma.

== Species ==
These species belong to the genus Eurylasma:

- Eurylasma angustum Jones, 2000
- Eurylasma ferulum Jones, 2000
- Eurylasma pyramidale Jones, 2000
