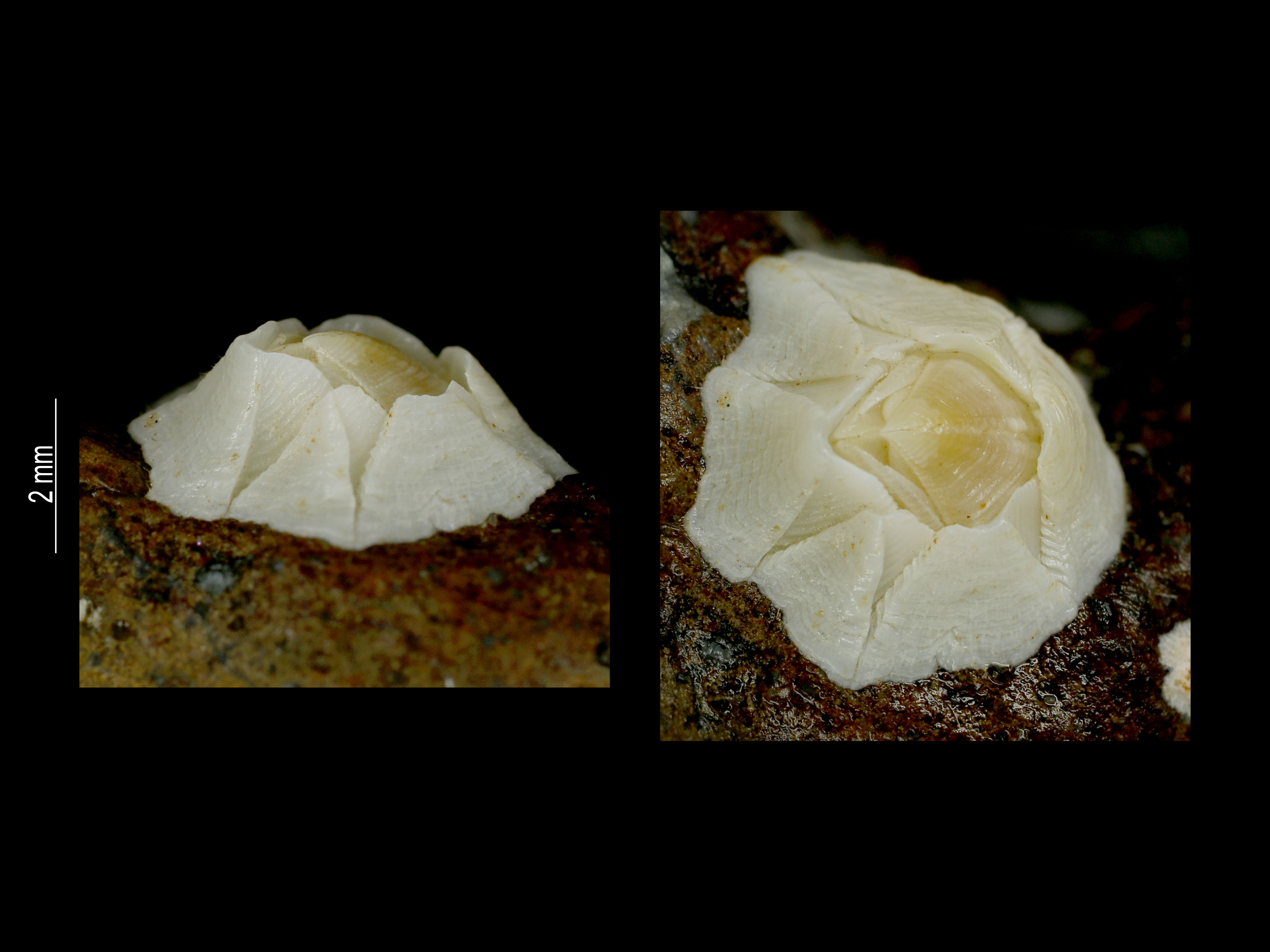
- Metalasma crassum, South Pacific

Scientific classification
- Kingdom: Animalia
- Phylum: Arthropoda
- Class: Thecostraca
- Subclass: Cirripedia
- Order: Balanomorpha
- Family: Pachylasmatidae
- Genus: Metalasma; Jones, 2000
- Species: M. crassum

Binomial name
- Metalasma crassum Jones, 2000

= Metalasma =

Genus of crustaceans

Metalasma is a genus of symmetrical sessile barnacles in the family Pachylasmatidae. There is one described species in Metalasma, M. crassum.
