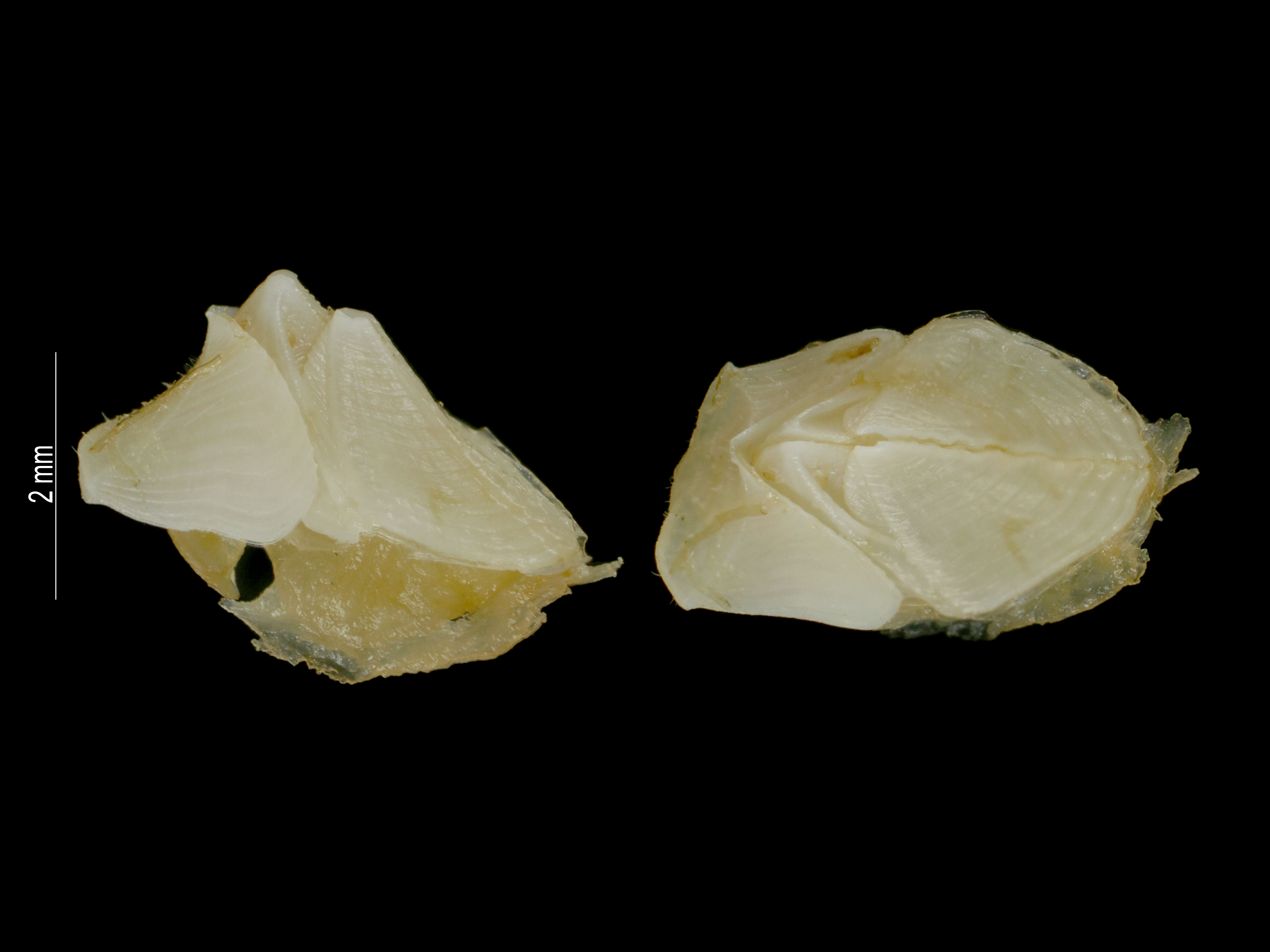
- Microlasma fragile, South Pacific

Scientific classification
- Kingdom: Animalia
- Phylum: Arthropoda
- Class: Thecostraca
- Subclass: Cirripedia
- Order: Balanomorpha
- Family: Pachylasmatidae
- Subfamily: Pachylasmatinae
- Genus: Microlasma; Jones, 2000

= Microlasma =

Genus of crustaceans

Microlasma is a genus of symmetrical sessile barnacles in the family Pachylasmatidae. There are at least four described species in Microlasma.

== Species ==
These species belong to the genus Microlasma:

- Microlasma arwetergum (Rosell, 1991)
- Microlasma crinoidophilum (Pilsbry, 1911)
- Microlasma fragile Jones, 2000
- Microlasma ochriderma (Foster, 1981)
