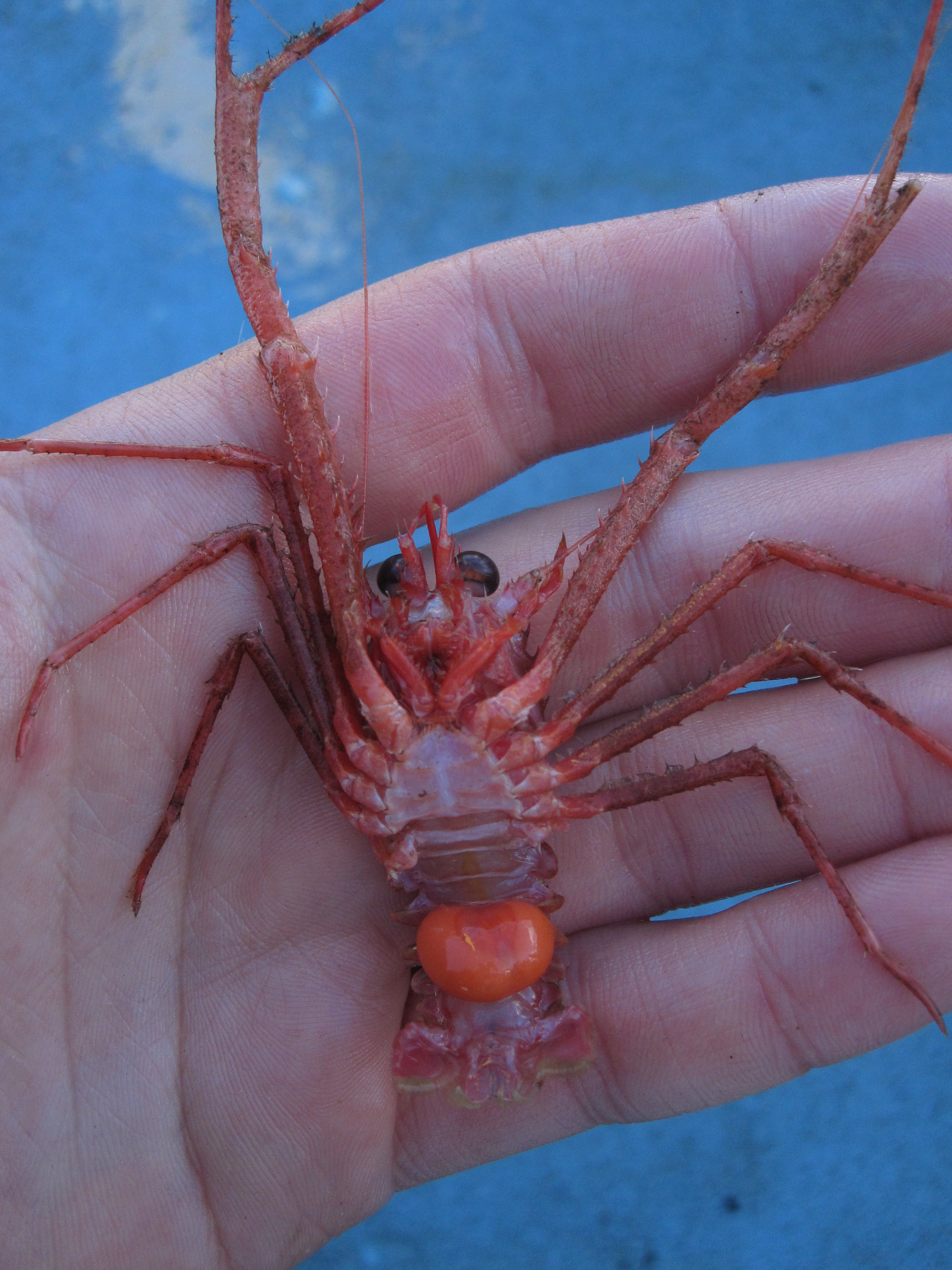
- Triangulus munidae on Munida tenuimana

Scientific classification
- Kingdom: Animalia
- Phylum: Arthropoda
- Clade: Pancrustacea
- Class: Thecostraca
- Subclass: Cirripedia
- Family: Triangulidae
- Genus: Triangulus; Smith, 1906

= Triangulus (crustacean) =

Genus of crustaceans

Triangulus is a genus of parasitic barnacles in the family Triangulidae, the sole genus of the family. There are at least four described species in Triangulus.

== Species ==
These species belong to the genus Triangulus:

- Triangulus bilobatus (Boschma, 1925)
- Triangulus cornutus (Boschma, 1935)
- Triangulus munidae Smith, 1906
- Triangulus papilio (Kossmann, 1872)
