= Pirusaccus =

Scientific classification
- Kingdom: Animalia
- Phylum: Arthropoda
- Class: Thecostraca
- Subclass: Cirripedia
- Family: Pirusaccidae; Høeg et al, 2019
- Genus: Pirusaccus; Lützen, 1985
- Species: P. socialis

Binomial name
- Pirusaccus socialis Lützen, 1985

Genus of crustaceans

Pirusaccus is a genus of parasitic barnacles in the family Pirusaccidae, the sole genus of the family. There is one described species in Pirusaccus, P. socialis.
