= Parthenopea =

Scientific classification
- Kingdom: Animalia
- Phylum: Arthropoda
- Class: Thecostraca
- Subclass: Cirripedia
- Family: Parthenopeidae; Rybakov & Høeg, 2013
- Genus: Parthenopea; Kossmann, 1874

Genus of crustaceans

Parthenopea is a genus of parasitic barnacles in the family Parthenopeidae, the sole genus of the family. There are at least three described species in Parthenopea.

== Species ==
These species belong to the genus Parthenopea:

- Parthenopea australis Lützen, Glenner & Lörz, 2009
- Parthenopea reinhardi Boyko & Williams, 2020
- Parthenopea subterranea Kossmann, 1874
