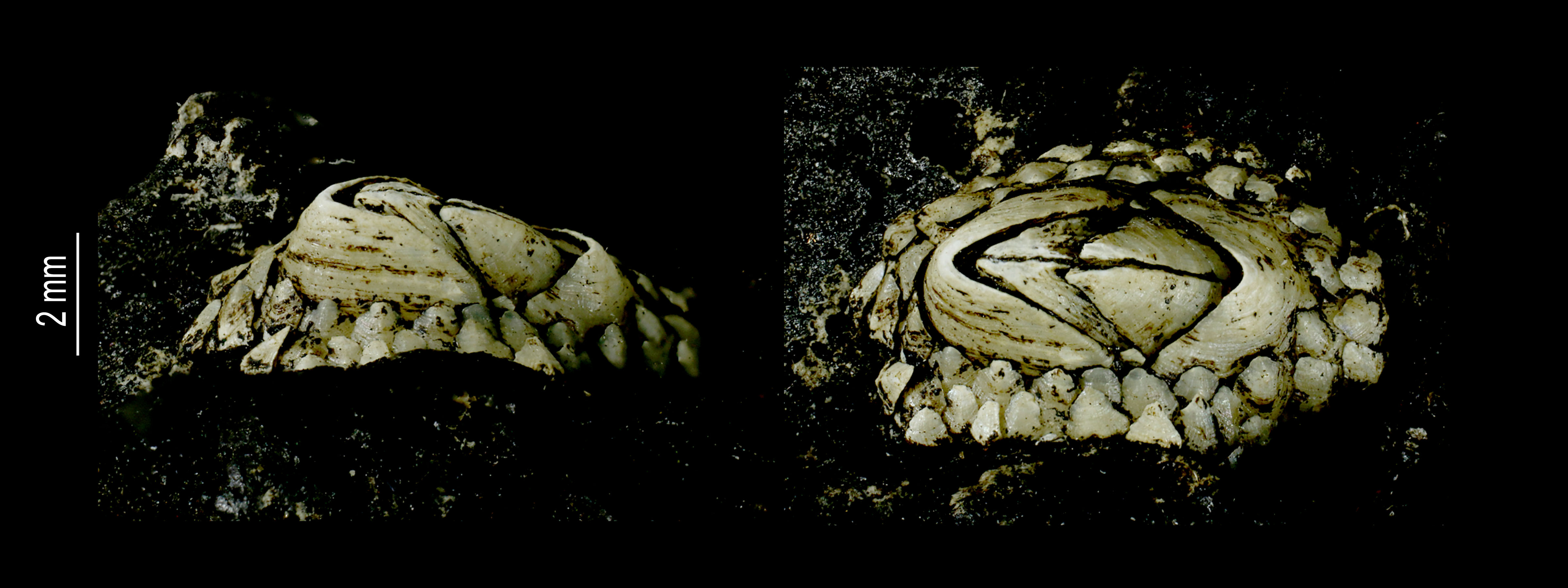

Scientific classification
- Kingdom: Animalia
- Phylum: Arthropoda
- Class: Thecostraca
- Subclass: Cirripedia
- Superorder: Thoracicalcarea
- Order: Scalpellomorpha
- Superfamily: Neolepadoidea
- Family: Neobrachylepadidae; Chan et al., 2021
- Genus: Neobrachylepas; Newman & Yamaguchi, 1995
- Species: N. relica

Binomial name
- Neobrachylepas relica Newman & Yamaguchi, 1995

= Neobrachylepas =

Genus of crustaceans

Neobrachylepas is a monotypic genus of crustaceans belonging to the monotypic family Neobrachylepadidae. The only species is Neobrachylepas relica.

The species is found in Pacific Ocean (near New Zealand).
