= Probathylepas =

Scientific classification
- Kingdom: Animalia
- Phylum: Arthropoda
- Class: Thecostraca
- Subclass: Cirripedia
- Order: Scalpellomorpha
- Family: Probathylepadidae; Ren & Sha, 2015
- Genus: Probathylepas; Ren & Sha, 2015
- Species: P. faxian

Binomial name
- Probathylepas faxian Ren & Sha, 2015

Genus of crustaceans

Probathylepas is a genus of acorn barnacles in the family Probathylepadidae, the sole genus of the family. There is one described species in Probathylepas, P. faxian.
