= Malacolepadidae =

Scientific classification
- Domain: Eukaryota
- Kingdom: Animalia
- Phylum: Arthropoda
- Class: Thecostraca
- Subclass: Cirripedia
- Order: Scalpellomorpha
- Superfamily: Lepadoidea
- Family: Malacolepadidae; Hiro, 1937

Family of crustaceans

Malacolepadidae is a family of acorn barnacles in the order Scalpellomorpha. There are at least two genera and two described species in Malacolepadidae.

== Genera ==
These genera belong to the family Malacolepadidae:

- Arcalepas Jones & Morton, 2009
- Malacolepas Hiro, 1933
