= Pachydiadema =

Pachydiadema Temporal range: Campanian

Scientific classification
- Kingdom: Animalia
- Phylum: Arthropoda
- Class: Thecostraca
- Subclass: Cirripedia
- Order: Balanomorpha
- Superfamily: †Pachydiadematoidea; Chan et al., 2021
- Family: †Pachydiadematidae; Chan et al., 2021
- Genus: †Pachydiadema; Withers, 1935
- Species: †P. cretaceum

Binomial name
- †Pachydiadema cretaceum Withers, 1935

Synonyms
- Catophragmus (Pachydiadema) cretaceum Withers, 1935

Extinct genus of barnacles

Pachydiadema is an extinct genus of acorn barnacles in the order Balanomorpha that lived in what is now Sweden during the early Campanian. The genus is monospecific, containing a single species, Pachydiadema cretaceum.

It is the only genus in the family Pachydiadematidae and superfamily Pachydiadematoidea, both of which are monotypic. It was originally described as a subgenus of Catophragmus, but was redescribed as a separate genus in 2014.
