= Archaeolepadomorpha =

Scientific classification
- Domain: Eukaryota
- Kingdom: Animalia
- Phylum: Arthropoda
- Class: Thecostraca
- Subclass: Cirripedia
- Infraclass: Thoracica
- Superorder: Thoracicalcarea
- Order: †Archaeolepadomorpha; Chan et al., 2021

Extinct order of barnacles

Archaeolepadomorpha is an extinct order of barnacles in the class Thecostraca. There are at least 3 families and more than 40 described species in Archaeolepadomorpha.

== Families ==
These families belong to the order Archaeolepadomorpha:

- Archaeolepadidae Gale, 2019
- Myolepadidae Gale, 2015 in Gale & Sørensen, 2015
- Stramentidae Withers, 1920
