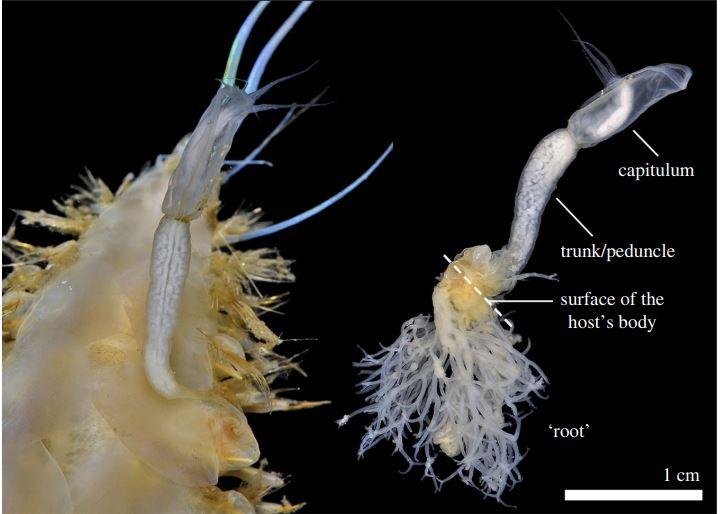

Scientific classification
- Kingdom: Animalia
- Phylum: Arthropoda
- Class: Thecostraca
- Subclass: Cirripedia
- Order: Scalpellomorpha
- Family: Rhizolepadidae; Zevina, 1980
- Genus: Rhizolepas; Day, 1939

= Rhizolepas =

Genus of crustaceans

Rhizolepas is a genus of crustaceans belonging to the monotypic family Rhizolepadidae.

Species:

- Rhizolepas annelidicola Day, 1939
- Rhizolepas gurjanovae Zevina, 1968
