= Eolepadomorpha =

Scientific classification
- Domain: Eukaryota
- Kingdom: Animalia
- Phylum: Arthropoda
- Class: Thecostraca
- Subclass: Cirripedia
- Infraclass: Thoracica
- Superorder: Phosphatothoracica
- Order: †Eolepadomorpha; Chan et al., 2021

Extinct order of barnacles

Eolepadomorpha is an extinct order of barnacles in the class Thecostraca. There are 2 families and about 14 described species in Eolepadomorpha.

== Families ==
These families and genera belong to the order Eolepadomorpha:

Order Eolepadomorpha Chan et al., 2021

Family Eolepadidae Buckeridge, 1983

Genus Eolepas Withers, 1928
Genus Toarcolepas Gale & Schweigert, 2015

Family Praelepadidae Chernyshev, 1930

Genus Illilepas Schram, 1986
Genus Praelepas Chernyshev, 1930
