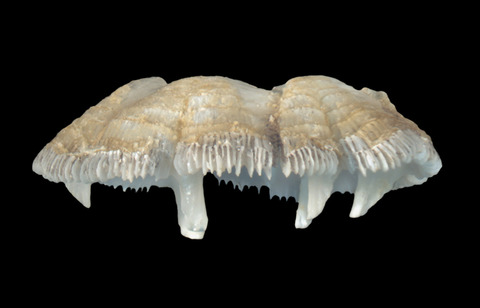
- Platylepas hexastylos

Scientific classification
- Kingdom: Animalia
- Phylum: Arthropoda
- Class: Thecostraca
- Subclass: Cirripedia
- Order: Balanomorpha
- Superfamily: Coronuloidea; Leach, 1817

Type genus
- Coronula Lamarck, 1802

Families
- Austrobalanidae Newman & Ross, 1976; Bathylasmatidae Newman & Ross, 1971; Chelonibiidae Pilsbry, 1916; Coronulidae Leach, 1817; Tetraclitidae Gruvel, 1903

Synonyms
- Balanomorphoidea Newman & Ross, 1976; Pachylasmatoidea Utinomi, 1968; Tetraclitoidea Gruvel, 1903

= Coronuloidea =

Coronuloidea Temporal range: Lutetian - Present, 47.8–0 Ma

Superfamily of barnacles

Coronuloidea is a superfamily of barnacles in the order Balanomorpha.
