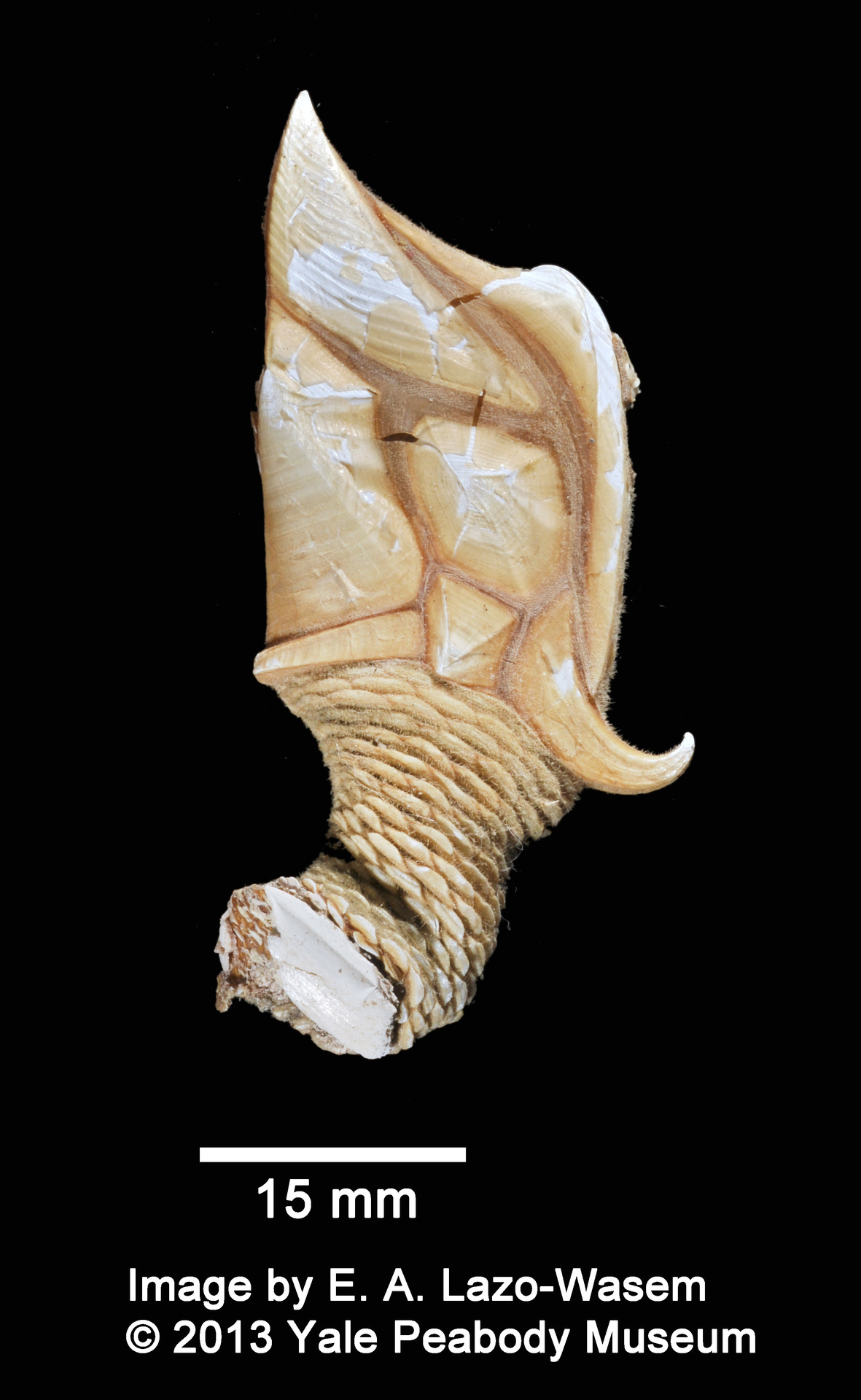
- Scalpellum stearnsii

Scientific classification
- Kingdom: Animalia
- Phylum: Arthropoda
- Clade: Pancrustacea
- Class: Thecostraca
- Subclass: Cirripedia
- Order: Scalpellomorpha
- Superfamily: Scalpelloidea
- Family: Scalpellidae; Pilsbry 1907

Subfamilies
- Amigdoscalpellinae Gale, 2015; Brochiinae Zevina, 1978; Meroscalpellinae Zevina, 1978; Scalpellinae Pilsbry, 1907; Scalpellopsinae Zevina, 1978; Virgiscalpellinae Gale, 2020

= Scalpellidae =

Family of barnacles

Scalpellidae is a family of acorn barnacles in the order Scalpellomorpha. There are about 25 genera and 220 described species in Scalpellidae.

== Genera ==
These genera belong to the family Scalpellidae:

- Abathescalpellum Newman & Ross, 1971
- Alcockianum Zevina, 1978
- Amigdoscalpellum Zevina, 1978
- Annandaleum Newman & Ross, 1971
- Arcoscalpellum Hoek, 1907
- Australscalpellum Newman & Ross, 1971
- Brochia Newman & Ross, 1971
- Catherinum Zevina, 1978
- Diotascalpellum Gale, 2015
- Graviscalpellum Foster, 1980
- Gymnoscalpellum Newman & Ross, 1971
- Hamatoscalpellum Zevina, 1978
- Litoscalpellum Newman & Ross, 1971
- Meroscalpellum Zevina, 1978
- Neoscalpellum Pilsbry, 1907
- Regioscalpellum Gale, 2015
- Scalpellopsis Broch, 1921
- Scalpellum Leach, 1818
- Weltnerium Zevina, 1978
- Zevinaella Shalaeva & Newman, 2016
- † Arcuatoscalpellum Gale, 2015
- † Collinslepas Gale, 2020
- † Jaegerscalpellum Gale, 2019
- † Virgilepas Gale, 2020
- † Virgiscalpellum Withers, 1935
