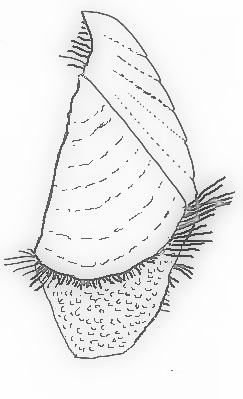

Scientific classification
- Kingdom: Animalia
- Phylum: Arthropoda
- Class: Thecostraca
- Subclass: Cirripedia
- Order: Iblomorpha
- Family: Idioiblidae; Buckeridge & Newman, 2006

Subfamilies
- Chaetolepadinae Buckeridge & Newman, 2006; Idioiblinae Buckeridge & Newman, 2006

= Idioiblidae =

Family of crustaceans

Idioiblidae is a family of normal barnacles in the order Iblomorpha. There are at least three genera and about five described species in Idioiblidae.

== Genera ==
These genera belong to the family Idioiblidae:

- Chaetolepas Studer, 1889
- Chitinolepas Buckeridge & Newman, 2006
- Idioibla Buckeridge & Newman, 2006
