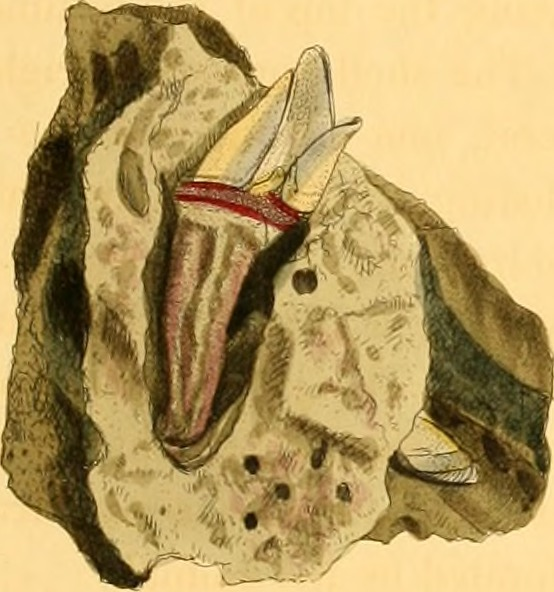

Scientific classification
- Kingdom: Animalia
- Phylum: Arthropoda
- Class: Thecostraca
- Subclass: Cirripedia
- Order: Pollicipedomorpha
- Family: Lithotryidae; Gruvel, 1905
- Genus: Lithotrya; Sowerby, 1822

= Lithotrya =

Genus of crustaceans

Lithotrya is a genus of crustaceans belonging to the monotypic family Lithotryidae.

The species of this genus are found in Southern Hemisphere.

Species:

- Lithotrya dorsalis (Ellis & Solander, 1786)
- Lithotrya nicobarica Reinhardt, 1850
- Lithotrya rhodiopus Gray, 1825
- Lithotrya valentiana (Gray, 1825)
