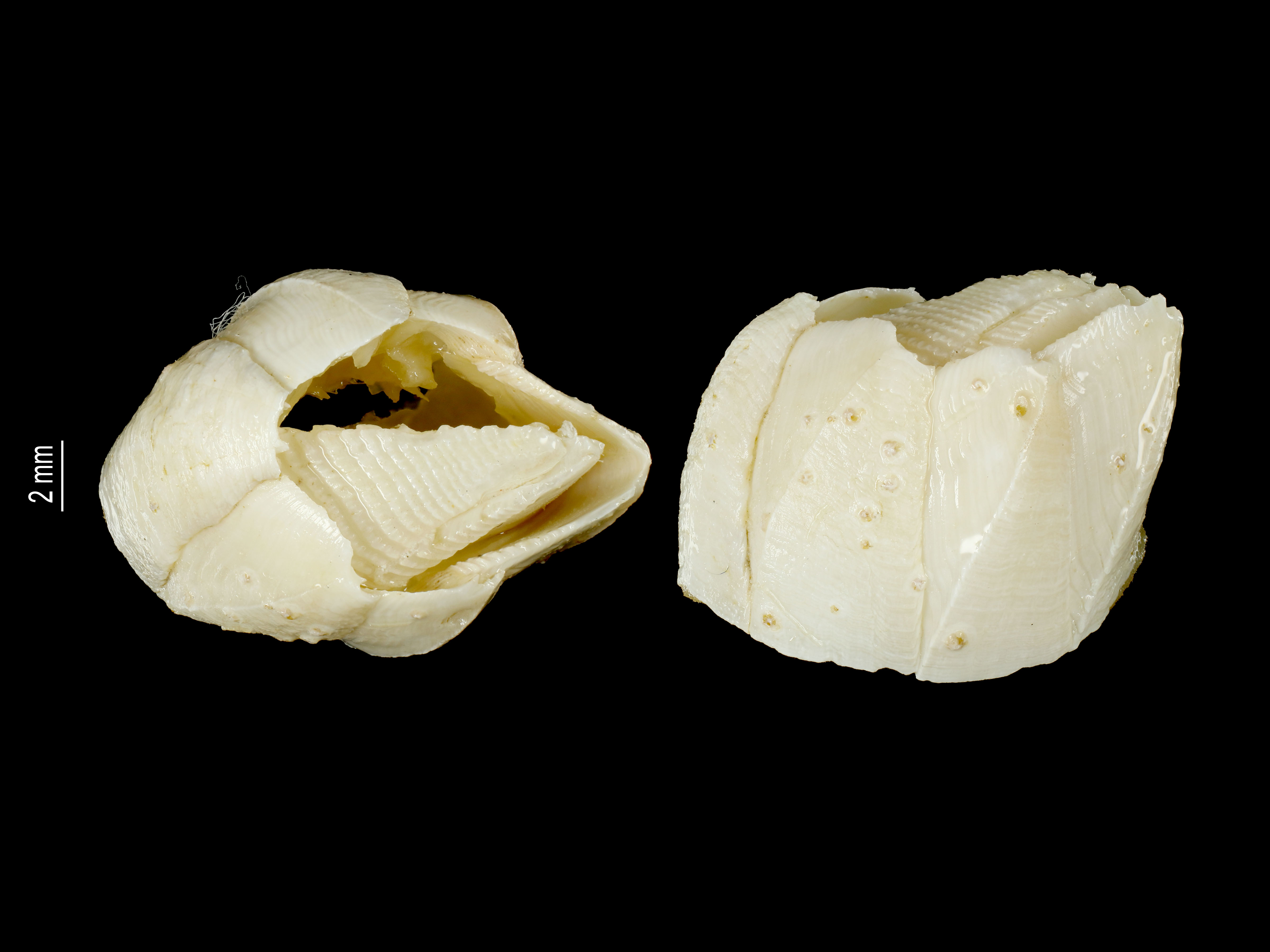
- Pachylasma ovatum

Scientific classification
- Kingdom: Animalia
- Phylum: Arthropoda
- Class: Thecostraca
- Subclass: Cirripedia
- Order: Balanomorpha
- Superfamily: Chthamaloidea
- Family: Pachylasmatidae; Utinomi, 1968

Subfamilies
- Eolasmatinae Buckeridge, 1983; Metalasmatinae Jones, 2000; Pachylasmatinae Utinomi, 1968

= Pachylasmatidae =

Family of crustaceans

Pachylasmatidae is a family of symmetrical sessile barnacles in the order Balanomorpha. There are about 10 genera and at least 30 described species in Pachylasmatidae.

== Genera ==
These genera belong to the family Pachylasmatidae:

- Atetrapachylasma Newman & Jones, 2011
- Eolasma Buckeridge, 1983
- Eurylasma Jones, 2000
- Eutomolasma Jones, 2000
- Metalasma Jones, 2000
- Microlasma Jones, 2000
- Neoeolasma Gale, 2020
- Pachylasma Darwin, 1854
- Pseudoctomeris Poltarukha, 1996
- Tetrapachylasma Foster, 1988
