= Bathylasmatidae =

Scientific classification
- Domain: Eukaryota
- Kingdom: Animalia
- Phylum: Arthropoda
- Class: Thecostraca
- Subclass: Cirripedia
- Order: Balanomorpha
- Superfamily: Coronuloidea
- Family: Bathylasmatidae

Family of crustaceans

Bathylasmatidae is a family of barnacles belonging to the order Balanomorpha.

Genera:

- Aaptolasma Newman & Ross, 1971
- Bathylasma Newman & Ross, 1971
- Hexelasma Hoek, 1913
- Mesolasma Foster, 1981
- Tessarelasma Withers, 1936
- Tetrachaelasma Newman & Ross, 1971
