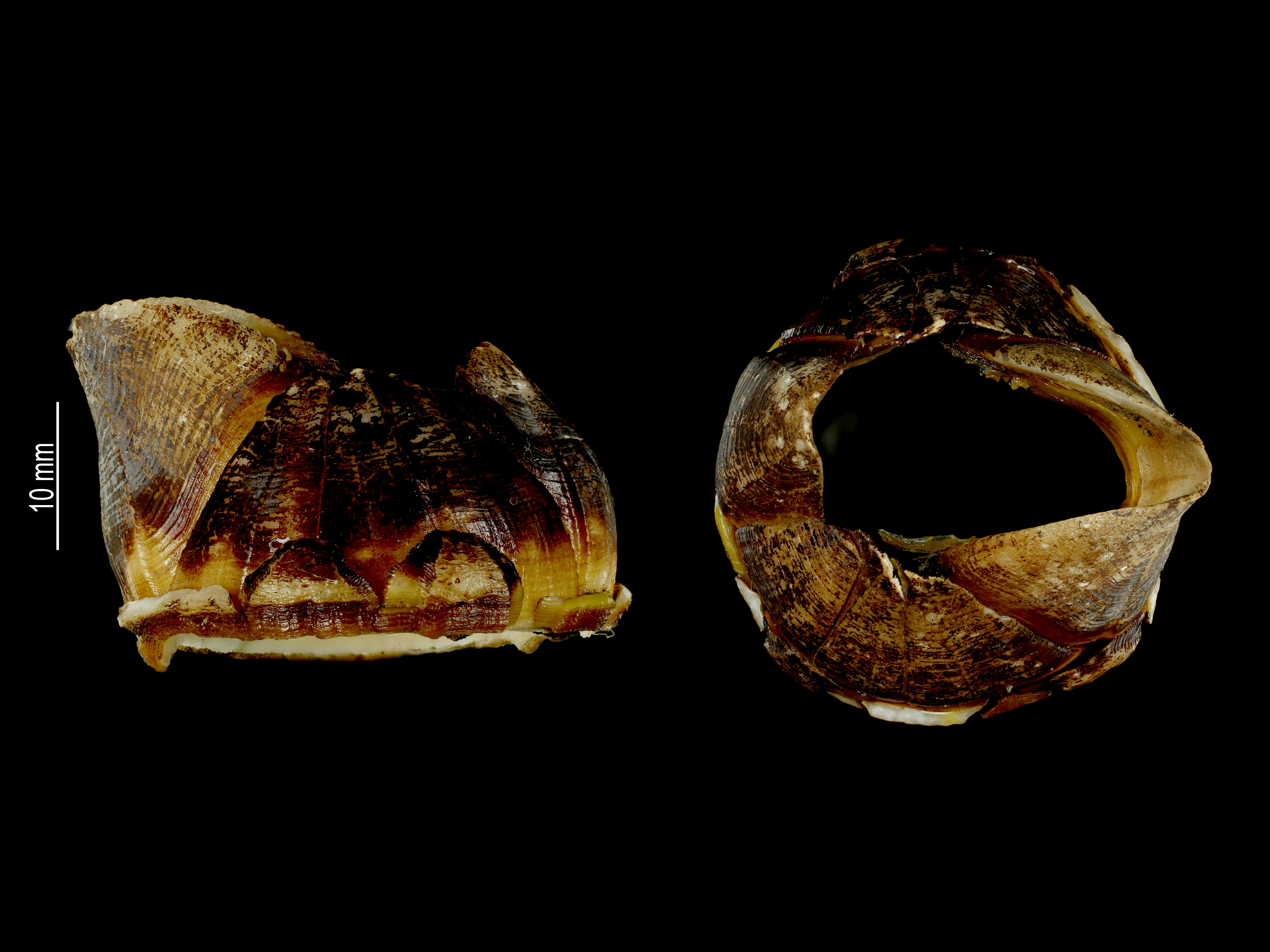
- Waikalasma boucheti, South Pacific

Scientific classification
- Kingdom: Animalia
- Phylum: Arthropoda
- Class: Thecostraca
- Subclass: Cirripedia
- Order: Balanomorpha
- Family: Waikalasmatidae
- Genus: Waikalasma; Buckeridge, 1983

= Waikalasma =

Genus of crustaceans

Waikalasma is a genus of symmetrical sessile barnacles in the family Waikalasmatidae, the sole genus of the family. There are at least three described species in Waikalasma.

== Species ==
These species belong to the genus Waikalasma:

- Waikalasma boucheti Buckeridge, 1996
- Waikalasma dianajonesae Chan, Chen, Rodriguez Moreno & Corbari, 2016
- Waikalasma juneae Buckeridge, 1983
