= Neoverrucidae =

Scientific classification
- Kingdom: Animalia
- Phylum: Arthropoda
- Class: Thecostraca
- Subclass: Cirripedia
- Order: Scalpellomorpha
- Superfamily: Neolepadoidea
- Family: Neoverrucidae

Family of crustaceans

Neoverrucidae is a family of crustaceans belonging to the order Scalpellomorpha.

Genera:

- Imbricaverruca Newman, 2000
- Neoverruca Newman, 1989
