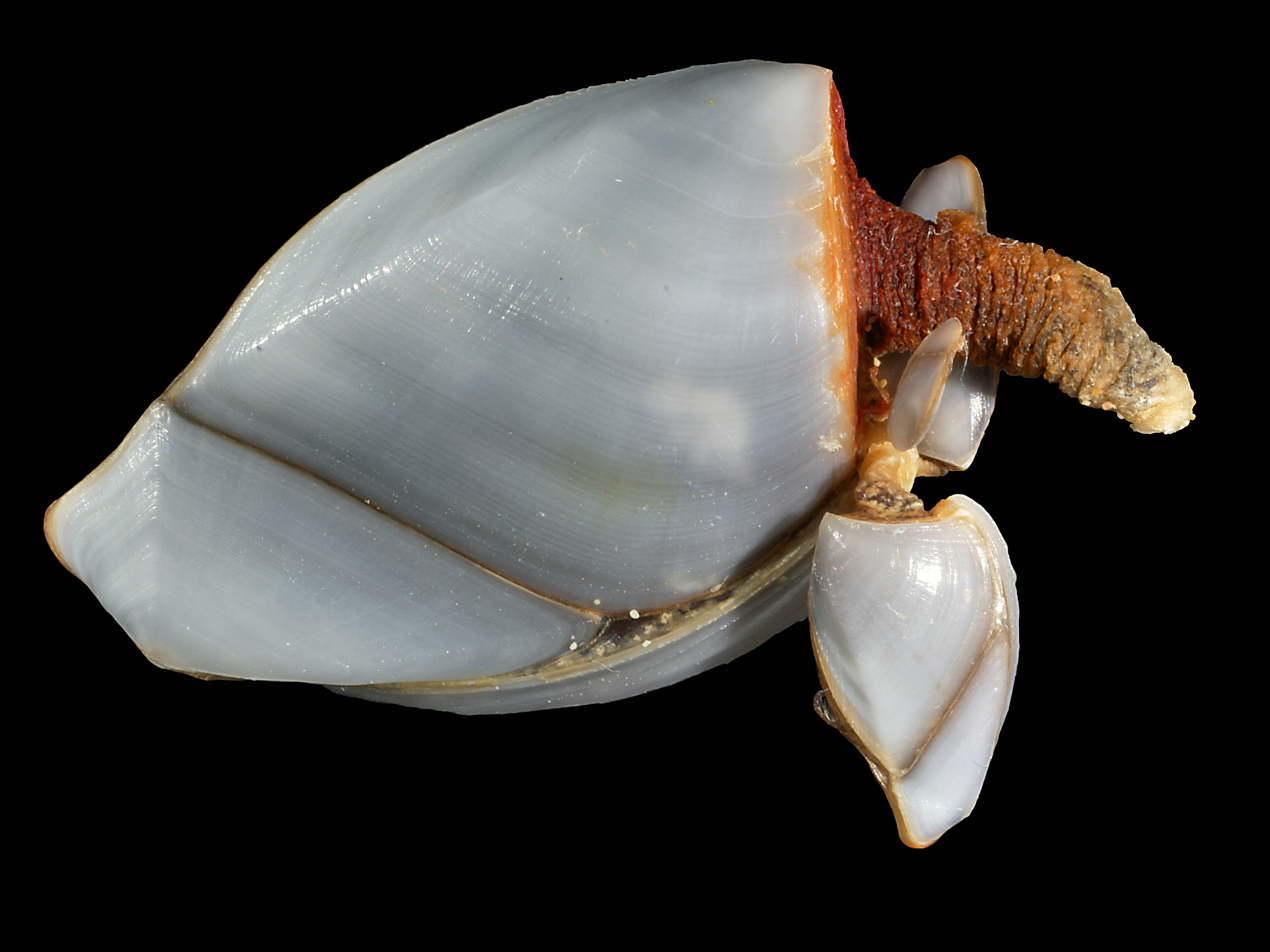
- Lepas anserifera

Scientific classification
- Domain: Eukaryota
- Kingdom: Animalia
- Phylum: Arthropoda
- Class: Thecostraca
- Subclass: Cirripedia
- Infraclass: Thoracica
- Superorder: Thoracicalcarea
- Order: Scalpellomorpha; Buckeridge & Newman, 2006

Synonyms
- Scalpelliformes Buckeridge & Newman, 2006

= Scalpellomorpha =

Order of barnacles

Scalpellomorpha is an order of barnacles in the class Thecostraca. There are about 11 families in 3 superfamilies and more than 450 described species in Scalpellomorpha.

== Families ==
Order Scalpellomorpha Buckeridge & Newman, 2006

Superfamily Lepadoidea Chan et al., 2021

Family Heteralepadidae Nilsson-Cantell, 1921
Family Lepadidae Darwin, 1852
Family Malacolepadidae Hiro, 1937
Family Poecilasmatidae Annandale, 1909
Family Rhizolepadidae Zevina, 1980

Superfamily Neolepadoidea Chan et al., 2021

Family Neobrachylepadidae Newman & Yamaguchi, 1995
Family Neolepadidae Yamaguchi, Newman & Hashimoto, 2004
Family Neoverrucidae Newman, 1989 in Hessler & Newman, 1989
Family Probathylepadidae Ren & Sha, 2015

Superfamily Scalpelloidea Chan et al., 2021

Family Scalpellidae Pilsbry, 1907
Family †Proverrucidae Newman, 1989 in Hessler & Newman, 1989
