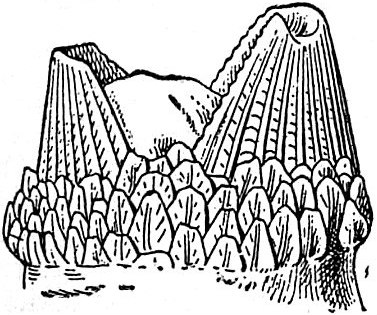
- Brachylepas

Scientific classification
- Domain: Eukaryota
- Kingdom: Animalia
- Phylum: Arthropoda
- Class: Thecostraca
- Subclass: Cirripedia
- Order: †Brachylepadomorpha
- Family: †Brachylepadidae; Woodward, 1901

= Brachylepadidae =

Brachylepadidae Temporal range: Tithonian–Aquitanian

Family of crustaceans

Brachylepadidae is an extinct family of barnacles in the order Brachylepadomorpha, the sole family in the order. There are about 7 genera and more than 20 described species in Brachylepadidae.

== Genera ==
These genera belong to the family Brachylepadidae:

- Brachylepas Woodward, 1901
- Epibrachylepas Gale, 2014
- Fallaxlepas Gale, 2020
- Faxelepas Gale, 2014
- Parabrachylepas Gale, 2014
- Pedupycnolepas Gale, 2014
- Pycnolepas Withers, 1914
