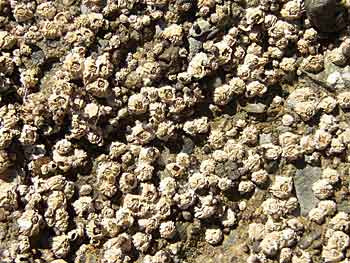
- Balanus glandula

Scientific classification
- Kingdom: Animalia
- Phylum: Arthropoda
- Clade: Pancrustacea
- Class: Thecostraca
- Subclass: Cirripedia
- Infraclass: Thoracica
- Superorder: Thoracicalcarea; Gale, 2015

Orders
- Balanomorpha Pilsbry, 1916; Calanticomorpha Chan et al., 2021; Pollicipedomorpha Chan et al., 2021; Scalpellomorpha Buckeridge & Newman, 2006; Verrucomorpha Pilsbry, 1916; †Archaeolepadomorpha Chan et al., 2021; †Brachylepadomorpha Withers, 1923

= Thoracicalcarea =

Superorder of barnacles

Thoracicalcarea is a monophyletic superorder of barnacles in the infraclass Thoracica. It contains seven orders, five extant (Balanomorpha, Calanticomorpha, Pollicipedomorpha, Scalpellomorpha, and Verrucomorpha) and two extinct (Archaeolepadomorpha and Brachylepadomorpha).
