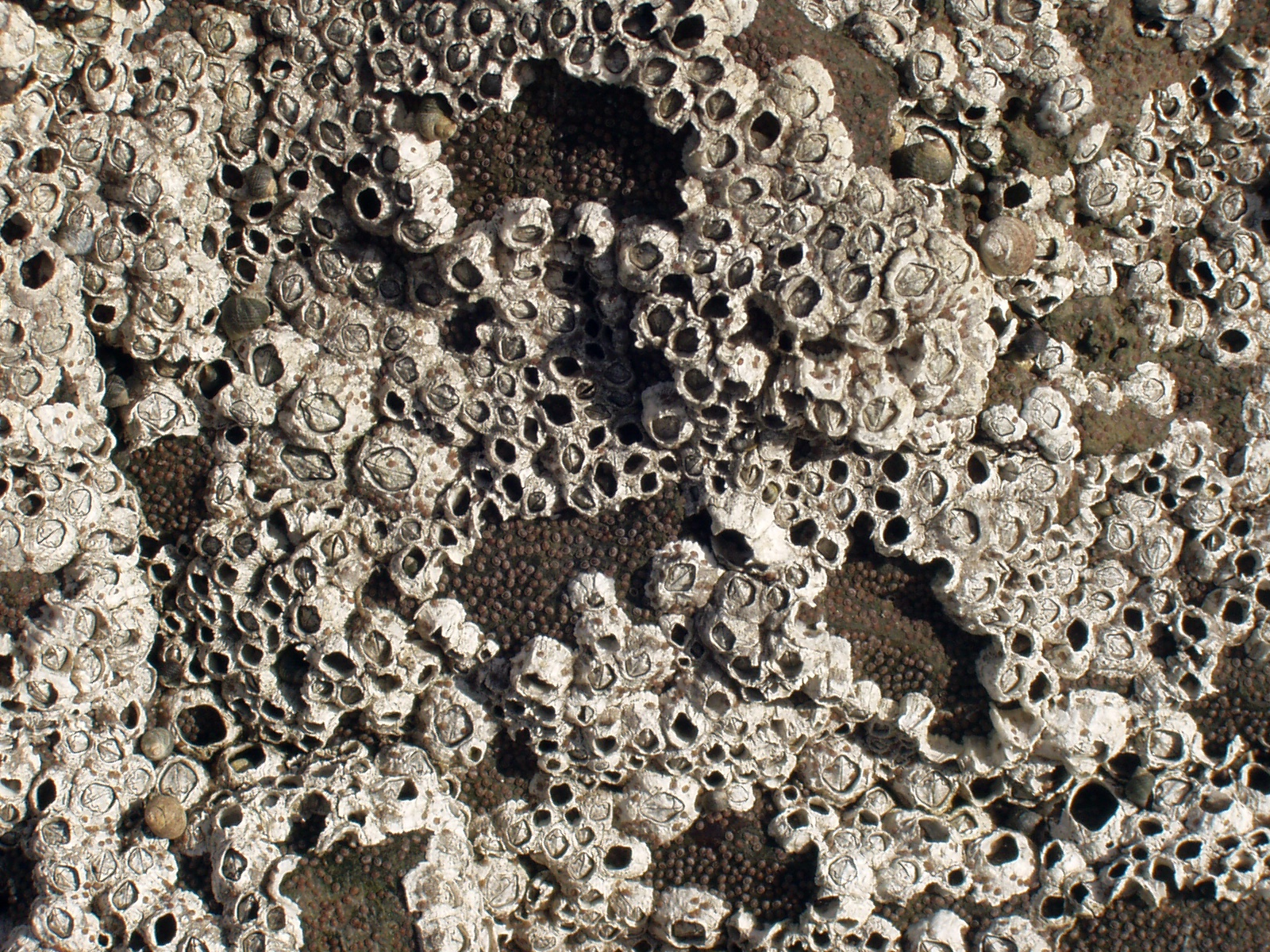
- Semibalanus balanoides

Scientific classification
- Kingdom: Animalia
- Phylum: Arthropoda
- Class: Thecostraca
- Subclass: Cirripedia
- Infraclass: Thoracica
- Superorder: Thoracicalcarea
- (unranked): Sessilia
- Order: Balanomorpha; Pilsbry, 1916

Superfamilies
- Balanoidea Leach, 1817; Chthamaloidea Darwin, 1854; Coronuloidea Leach, 1817; Elminioidea Chan et al., 2021; † Pachydiadematoidea Chan et al., 2021

= Balanomorpha =

Suborder of barnacles

The Balanomorpha are an order of barnacles, containing familiar sessile shelled acorn barnacles of the seashore. The order contains these families:

- Austrobalanidae Newman & Ross, 1976
- Balanidae Leach, 1817 (acorn barnacles)
- Bathylasmatidae Newman & Ross, 1971
- Catophragmidae Utinomi, 1968
- Chelonibiidae Pilsbry, 1916 (turtle barnacles)
- Chionelasmatidae Buckeridge, 1983
- Chthamalidae Darwin, 1854 (star barnacles)
- Coronulidae Leach, 1817 (whale barnacles)
- Elminiidae Foster, 1982
- Pachylasmatidae Utinomi, 1968
- Pyrgomatidae Gray, 1825 (coral barnacle)
- Tetraclitidae Gruvel, 1903
- Waikalasmatidae Ross & Newman, 2001
- † Pachydiadematidae Chan et al., 2021
