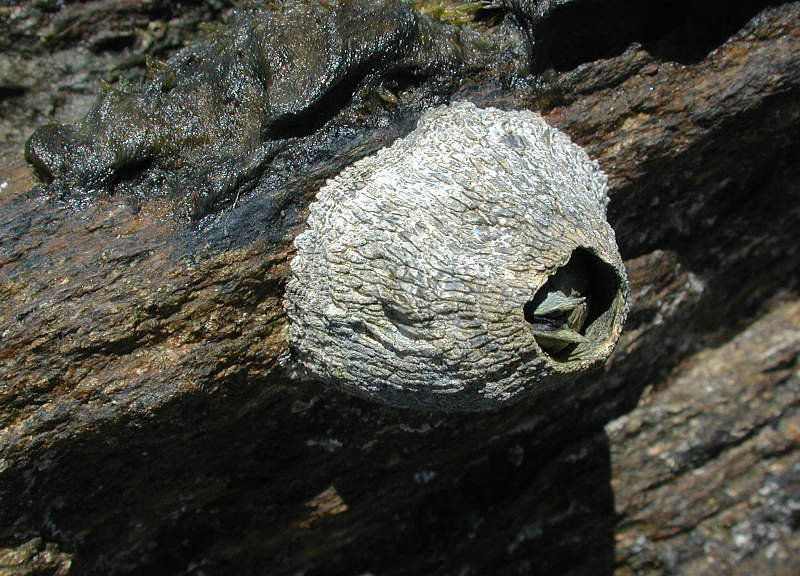
- A barnacle (Cirripedia) of the family Balanidae, Mission Beach, Queensland, Australia, 2001.
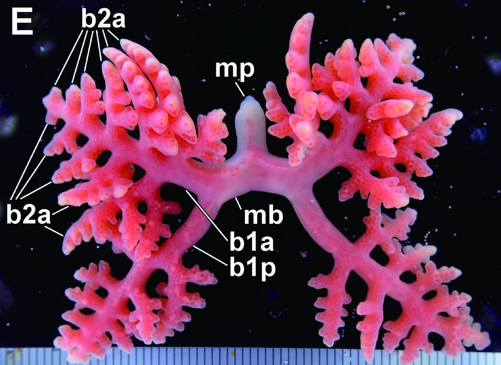
- Dendrogaster tobasuii, a parasitic member of Ascothoracida

Scientific classification
- Kingdom: Animalia
- Phylum: Arthropoda
- Clade: Pancrustacea
- Superclass: Multicrustacea
- Class: Thecostraca; Gruvel, 1905

Subclasses
- Facetotecta; Ascothoracida; Cirripedia

= Thecostraca =

Thecostraca Temporal range: Carboniferous–Recent

Class of crustaceans

Thecostraca (from Ancient Greek θήκη (thḗkē) 'box' and ὄστρακον (óstrakon) 'shell') is a class of marine invertebrates containing over 2,200 described species. Many species have planktonic larvae which become sessile or parasitic as adults.

The most prevalent subgroup are the barnacles (subclass Cirripedia), constituting a little over 2,100 known species.

The subgroup Facetotecta contains a single genus, Hansenocaris, known only from the tiny planktonic nauplii called "y-larvae". These larvae have no known adult form, though it is suspected that they are parasites, and their affinity is uncertain. Some researchers believe that they may be larval tantulocaridans. No larval tantulocaridans are currently known.

The group Ascothoracida contains about 110 species, all parasites of coelenterates and echinoderms.

The nauplius larvae (sometimes absent) can be both lecithotrophic (non-feeding) and planktotrophic (feeding), and is followed by a larval stage called the cyprid, which is always lecithotrophic. The cypridoid larvae are referred to as the y-cyprid in the Facetotecta, the a-cyprid in the Ascothoracida, and the c-cyprid, or just cyprid, in the Cirripedia.

== Classification ==
This article follows Chan et al. (2021) and the World Register of Marine Species in placing Thecostraca as a class of Crustacea and in the following classification of thecostracans down to the level of orders. Previously, Thecostraca was considered a subclass of Maxillopoda. Significant changes in the organization of Cirripedia's orders, families, and genera were introduced in 2021 by Chan et al. and accepted by the World Register of Marine Species.

Class Thecostraca Gruvel, 1905

- Subclass Ascothoracida Lacaze-Duthiers, 1880
  - Order Laurida Grygier, 1987
  - Order Dendrogastrida Grygier, 1987
- Subclass Facetotecta Grygier, 1985
- Subclass Cirripedia Burmeister, 1834
  - Infraclass Acrothoracica Gruvel, 1905
    - Order Lithoglyptida Kolbasov, Newman & Hoeg, 2009
    - Order Cryptophialida Kolbasov, Newman & Hoeg, 2009
  - Infraclass Rhizocephala Müller, 1862
  - Infraclass Thoracica Darwin, 1854
    - Superorder Phosphatothoracica Gale, 2019 (paraphyletic)
      - Order Eolepadomorpha Chan et al., 2021 †
      - Order Iblomorpha Buckeridge & Newman, 2006
    - Superorder Thoracicalcarea Gale, 2015
      - Order Calanticomorpha Chan et al., 2021
      - Order Brachylepadomorpha Withers, 1923 †
      - Order Archaeolepadomorpha Chan et al., 2021 †
      - Order Verrucomorpha Pilsbry, 1916
      - Order Scalpellomorpha Buckeridge & Newman, 2006
      - Order Pollicipedomorpha Chan et al., 2021
      - Order Balanomorpha Pilsbry, 1916

== Phylogeny ==
The following cladogram depicts the internal relationships of the Thecostraca as of 2021.

- Thecostraca
  - Facetotecta
  - - Ascothoracida
      - Laurida
      - Dendrogastrida
    - Cirripedia
      - - Acrothoracica
          - Cryptophialida
          - Lithoglyptida
      - - Thoracica
          - Iblomorpha
          - Eolepadomorpha†
          - Thoracicalcarea
            - Archaeolepadomorpha †
            - - Pollicipedomorpha
              - - Calanticomorpha
                - Scalpellomorpha
                - - Brachylepadomorpha†
                  - Sessilia
                    - Verrucomorpha
                    - Balanomorpha
        - Rhizocephala
