= List of prehistoric barnacles =

This list of prehistoric barnacles is an incomplete, and ongoing listing of all barnacle genera known from the fossil record:

- Acasta
- Actinobalanus
- Aporolepas
- Archaeolepas
- Arcoscalpellum
- Armatobalanus
- Arossia
- Austrobalanus
- Austromegabalanus
- Austrominius
- Balanus
- Bassettina
- Bathylasma
- Blastolepas
- Brachylepas
- Bryozobia
- Calantica
- Catolasmus
- Catomerus
- Catophragmus
- Ceratoconcha
- Chamaesipho
- Chelonibia
- Chesaconcavus
- Chionelasmus
- Chirona
- Chthamalus
- Concavus
- Coronula
- Cretiscalpellum
- Creusia
- Cryptolepas
- Cyprilepas
- Dosima
- Elminius
- Emersonius
- Endosacculus
- Eoacasta
- Eoceratoconcha
- Eolasma
- Eolepas
- Eoverruca
- Epopella
- Euscalpellum
- Fistulobalanus
- Fosterella
- Graviscalpellum
- Hesperibalanus
- Hexechamaesipho
- Hexelasma
- Ibla
- Illilepas
- Kathpalmeria
- Lepas
- Lophobalanus
- Loriculina
- Mclellania
- Megabalanus
- Membranobalanus
- Mesolasma
- Mesoscalpellum
- Neolepas
- Neoscalpellum
- Nesochthamalus
- Notobalanus
- Notochthamalus
- Octomeris
- Oxynaspis
- Pachydiadema
- Pachylasma
- Palaeobalanus
- Paraconcavus
- Pectinoacasta
- Platylepas
- Poecilasma
- Pollicipes
- Priscansermarinus
- Proverruca
- Pseudoacasta
- Pseudoctomeris
- Pycnolepas
- Pyrgoma
- Rehderella
- Rogerella (trace fossil)
- Scalpellum
- Schreteriella
- Scillaelepas
- Semibalanus
- Smilium
- Solidobalanus
- Stramentum
- Tamiosoma
- Tasmanobalanus
- Tessarelasma
- Tesseroplax
- Tesseropora
- Tetraclita
- Tetrinis
- Titanolepas
- Trilasmis
- Trypetesa
- Ulophysema
- Verruca
- Virgiscalpellum
- Waikalasma
- Waiparaconus
- Zeascalpellum
- Zeugmatolepas

== See also ==
- List of prehistoric brittle stars
- List of prehistoric sea cucumbers
- List of crinoid genera
