= Chamaesipho grebneffi =

†Chamaesipho grebneffi Temporal range: Oligocene

Scientific classification
- Domain: Eukaryota
- Kingdom: Animalia
- Phylum: Arthropoda
- Class: Thecostraca
- Subclass: Cirripedia
- Order: Balanomorpha
- Family: Chthamalidae
- Genus: Chamaesipho
- Species: C. grebneffi

Binomial name
- Chamaesipho grebneffi Buckeridge, et al., 2014: 7

Species of barnacle

Chamaesipho grebneffi is the first extinct member of the Notochthamalinae to be described, and the oldest chthamaloid barnacle known. This species is a fully derived Chamaesipho, and indicates a considerable antiquity for Chthamaloidea.

Three extinct species of Chthamalus from the middle Miocene of the faluns of Touraine, France were described in 2008 by Carriol. the New Zealand species is Oligocene, and considerably older.

== Discussion ==
Like the three living species of Chamaesipho, the shell of C. grebneffi begins with 6 plates, fusing completely at about 2 mm diameter. Freegrown specimens show a stellate basal outline. The scutum is highly distinctive in tergal margin equal in length to basal margin. In all other Chamaesipho, tergal margin is much shorter than basal. The tergum is not definitely identified.

Chamaesipho grebneffi is interpreted, from wear patterns on the shell, to have occupied high littoral positions on shore. Entire assemblage described by Buckeridge indicates shallow agitated waters of several habitat zones.

=== Nomenclature ===
- Chamaesipho brunnea Moore. Buckeridge, 1983b: 80 (citation of lower Miocene shells without opercular plates).
- Chamaesipho grebneffi Buckeridge, 2014: 7 (original description).
- Type locality: late Oligocene (near Duntroonian/Waitakian stage boundary), Chatton Formation, Cosy Dell farm, Southland, New Zealand. Known definitely only from this locality.
