= Chamaesipho tasmanica =

Scientific classification
- Kingdom: Animalia
- Phylum: Arthropoda
- Clade: Pancrustacea
- Class: Thecostraca
- Subclass: Cirripedia
- Order: Balanomorpha
- Family: Chthamalidae
- Genus: Chamaesipho
- Species: C. tasmanica

Binomial name
- Chamaesipho tasmanica Foster & Anderson, 1986: 58

Species of barnacle

Chamaesipho tasmanica is an intertidal shoreline barnacle of Australia. Its principal range centers in New South Wales, and Tasmania. Columnar colonies can be found on high intertidal rocks relatively free of dense seaweed. Individuals are small, less than 15 mm, and grayish in color.

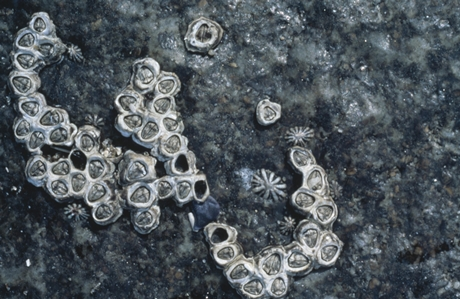
Cluster of Chamaesipho tasmanica Foster and Anderson, 1986, from Port Phillips, Victoria, Australia

== Definition and discussion ==
Chamaesipho tasmanica is a small species, with carinorostral diameter of about 10 mm, much smaller than Chamaesipho brunnea, and similar in size to Chamaesipho columna. Crowded colonies become columnar.

The scutum possesses a clear rounded adductor ridge, best developed of all species of Chamaesipho. Articular ridge is large, rounded, with deep articular furrow. The tergum is higher than the other two species, with a broad distinct articular furrow, and 3-7 tergal depressor crests, and no tergal spur. Card setae are present only on anterior rami of cirrus I and cirrus II.

=== Nomenclature and synonymy ===
- Chamaesipho tasmanica Foster & Anderson, 1986: 58 (original description); Poltarukha, 2006 (supplemental description and cirral setation formulae).
- Chamaesipho columna (Spengler, 1790) in part of authors (Australian localities only); see Foster & Anderson, 1986: 59 for Australian references list.
- Type locality: Manly Beach (south end), Sydney, Australia, approximately 41.331999°S 174.799261°E).
- Type specimens repository: Holotype: Australian Museum, Sydney, P35692. Paratypes: Australian Museum, P35693; National Museum of New Zealand, Wellington, NMNZ Cr. 3359.

=== Vernacular name ===
Locally, this species is called the honeycomb barnacle, from its appearance in crowded colonies.

== Geographic and environmental data ==
The natural range of Chamaesipho tasmanica is restricted to Australian waters, principally New South Wales and Tasmania. Northernmost reported locality is Cape Byron in northern New South Wales. West of Tasmania, it is known as far as Point Sinclair in Great Australian Bight. The species has been noted once at Lord Howe Island.

Chamaesipho tasmanica is found on rocks in high intertidal zone in exposed areas. It will not settle on other substrates, and will not colonize sheltered areas. C. tasmanica is subject to whelk predation, so will avoid seaweed covered locations which give shelter to whelks.
