= Chamaesipho =

Chamaesipho Temporal range: Oligocene–Recent

Scientific classification
- Domain: Eukaryota
- Kingdom: Animalia
- Phylum: Arthropoda
- Class: Thecostraca
- Subclass: Cirripedia
- Order: Balanomorpha
- Family: Chthamalidae
- Subfamily: Notochthamalinae
- Genus: Chamaesipho; Darwin, 1854470

Genus of barnacles

Chamaesipho is a genus of four-plated notochthamaline barnacles in the Pacific Ocean limited to Australian/New Zealand temperate waters. They are intertidal in preference, and tend to form crowded columnar colonies. They can be identified in the field by having a four-plated wall, an unfused rostrum, and narrow opercular plates. Elminius, which also inhabits the same area, has four plates in its shell wall. However, in Elminius, the rostrum and rostrolatera are fused completely, and the compound rostrum receives the alae of the adjacent carinolaterals. In Chamaesipho, the unfused rostrum bears alae, and closely resembles the carina in appearance.

== Definition and Discussion ==
The primary shell wall is four plated, reduced from six by fusion of rostrolatera and carinolaterals during ontogeny. No sutural interfolding is observed. With age, all plate sutures become concrescent. The basis is membraneous. Opercular plates are deeply articulated, but do not fuse together. The scutum bears a visible lateral depressor pit, and a scutal adductor ridge which ranges from nearly absent/indistinct to rounded prominent. The tergum is pitted internally. There is no trace of a tergal spur, and the tergal depressor area is wide, with prominent crests.

In soft part morphology, caudal appendages are absent. The mandible is tridentate, or quadridentate, and may have short teeth on a combed lower margin.

Full reference lists for Chamaesipho brunnea and C. columna to 1976 are to be found in Newman & Ross, 1976.43 See Poltarukha, 2006 for 1976-2006 significant citations.

=== Included species (3) ===
- Chamaesipho brunnea Moore, 1944
- Chamaesipho columna (Spengler, 1790) (Type Species)
- †Chamaesipho grebneffi Buckeridge, Lee & Robinson, 2014
- Chamaesipho tasmanica Foster & Anderson, 1986

== Identification Key to Species of Chamaesipho ==
- 1. Articular margin of scutum equal in length to basal margin ................................................................................ C. grebneffi
- a. Articular margin of scutum markedly shorter than basal margin ........................................................................................ 2
- 2. Articular lobe of scutum large, rectangular; scutal adductor ridge absent or very vague; shell large, to >19 mm; shell and body colored brown .................................................................................................................................................... C. brunnea
- a. Articular lobe of scutum smaller, rounded; scutal adductor ridge clear; shell smaller; shell white ......................................... 3
- 3. Scutal adductor ridge short, distinct; shell small, white, <10 mm diameter ......................................................... C. columna
- a. Scutal adductor ridge longer, rounded, clear; shell gray, crowded colonies honeycomb-like ............................... C. tasmanica

(Modified from Poltarukha, 2006)

== Geographic range and Habitat ==
As presently defined, Chamaesipho is found in the upper littoral to sublittoral zone of Australia, Tasmania, and New Zealand. Normally, exposed, higher littoral zones are preferred. No verifiable records of Chamaesipho are known outside of Australia and New Zealand. Darwin, 1854, described Chamaesipho scutelliformis, a living species from South China Sea, with considerable reservations as to generic assignment.472 Foster, in 1982, proposed the genus Chinochthamalus to receive this highly unusual form. In his original description of Chamaesipho columna, Spengler appears to have used abnormally large shells listed as from Otaheite (Tahiti). In Foster and Anderson, 1986, these shells are considered to be likely Epopella, from New Zealand, and mislabeled.

The only previously known fossil record was a Miocene occurrence from New Zealand ascribed questionably to Chamaesipho brunnea. No opercular plates were present in this material, thus exact species placement cannot be determined. Chamaesipho grebneffi from the late Oligocene of New Zealand was recently described by Buckeridge, et al., with opercular plates present. The four completely fused shell plates show that Chamaesipho was fully derived on generic level in Paleogene times.
