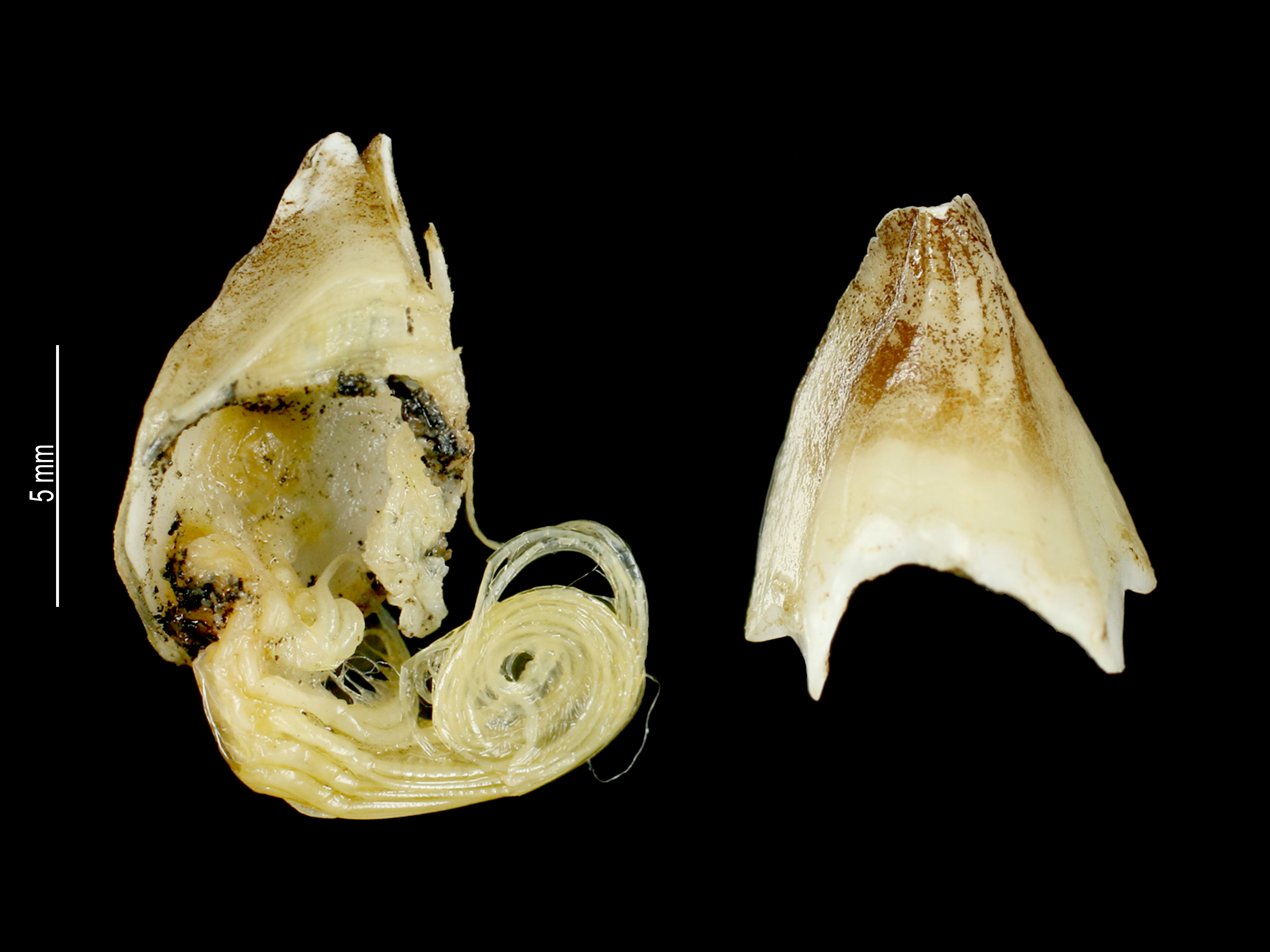
- Eochionelasmus ohtai, North Fiji Basin, Japan, depth 1990m

Scientific classification
- Kingdom: Animalia
- Phylum: Arthropoda
- Class: Thecostraca
- Subclass: Cirripedia
- Order: Balanomorpha
- Family: Chionelasmatidae
- Genus: Eochionelasmus
- Species: E. ohtai

Binomial name
- Eochionelasmus ohtai Yamaguchi, 1990

= Eochionelasmus ohtai =

Species of barnacle

Eochionelasmus ohtai is a species of symmetrical sessile barnacle in the family Chionelasmatidae.

== Subspecies ==
These subspecies belong to the species Eochionelasmus ohtai:

- Eochionelasmus ohtai manusensis Yamaguchi & Newman, 1997
- Eochionelasmus ohtai ohtai Yamaguchi, 1990
