= Austrominius modestus =

- Austrominius modestus and Semibalanus balanoides

Scientific classification
- Kingdom: Animalia
- Phylum: Arthropoda
- Clade: Pancrustacea
- Class: Thecostraca
- Subclass: Cirripedia
- Order: Balanomorpha
- Family: Elminiidae
- Genus: Austrominius
- Species: A. modestus

Binomial name
- Austrominius modestus (Darwin, 1854)

Synonyms
- Elminius modestus Darwin, 1854

Species of barnacle

Austrominius modestus (syn. Elminius modestus) is a species of barnacle in the family Elminiidae, native to Australia, Tasmania and New Zealand, but now spread to Britain and the north west coasts of Europe. It reaches a maximum size of about 10 millimetres (3/8 in) in diameter.

== Description ==
A. modestus is a pearly grey, semi-translucent barnacle. It is composed of four distinct plates and leans a little to one side.

== Distribution and habitat ==
A. modestus originated in Australia and was first seen in British waters, in Chichester Harbour, during the Second World War. It was believed to have arrived on the hulls of ships, or possibly the larval stages travelled in bilge water. It has become very common in southern England and Wales and is spreading northwards, but the spread may be limited by the temperature of the sea. It is found on the upper middle shore and is tolerant of low salinity levels where fresh water enters the sea. It avoids exposed positions. It had reached the Scottish Borders by 1960 and Shetland by 1978. It is found on the Atlantic coasts of Europe from Gibraltar to Germany.

== Ecology ==
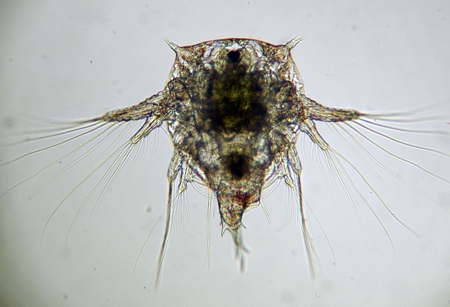
Nauplius of A. modestus

A. modestus is a suspension feeder. It has feathery appendages which beat rhythmically to draw plankton and other organic particles into the shell for consumption. Eggs are laid and develop into nauplius larvae which are released into the phytoplankton. These then develop into cyprid larvae which later settle and cement themselves onto a rocky substrate.

In the British Isles, A. modestus competes with Semibalanus balanoides, whereas in southern Europe it also competes with Chthamalus spp. It is particularly successful because it grows fast, tolerates reduced salinity, has a lower temperature tolerance than Chthamalus spp and a higher tolerance than Balanus spp. It is also a threat to native species because it reaches maturity in its first season and can produce several broods of larvae per year. It has an extended habitat as it grows both high up the shore and in the neritic zone.
