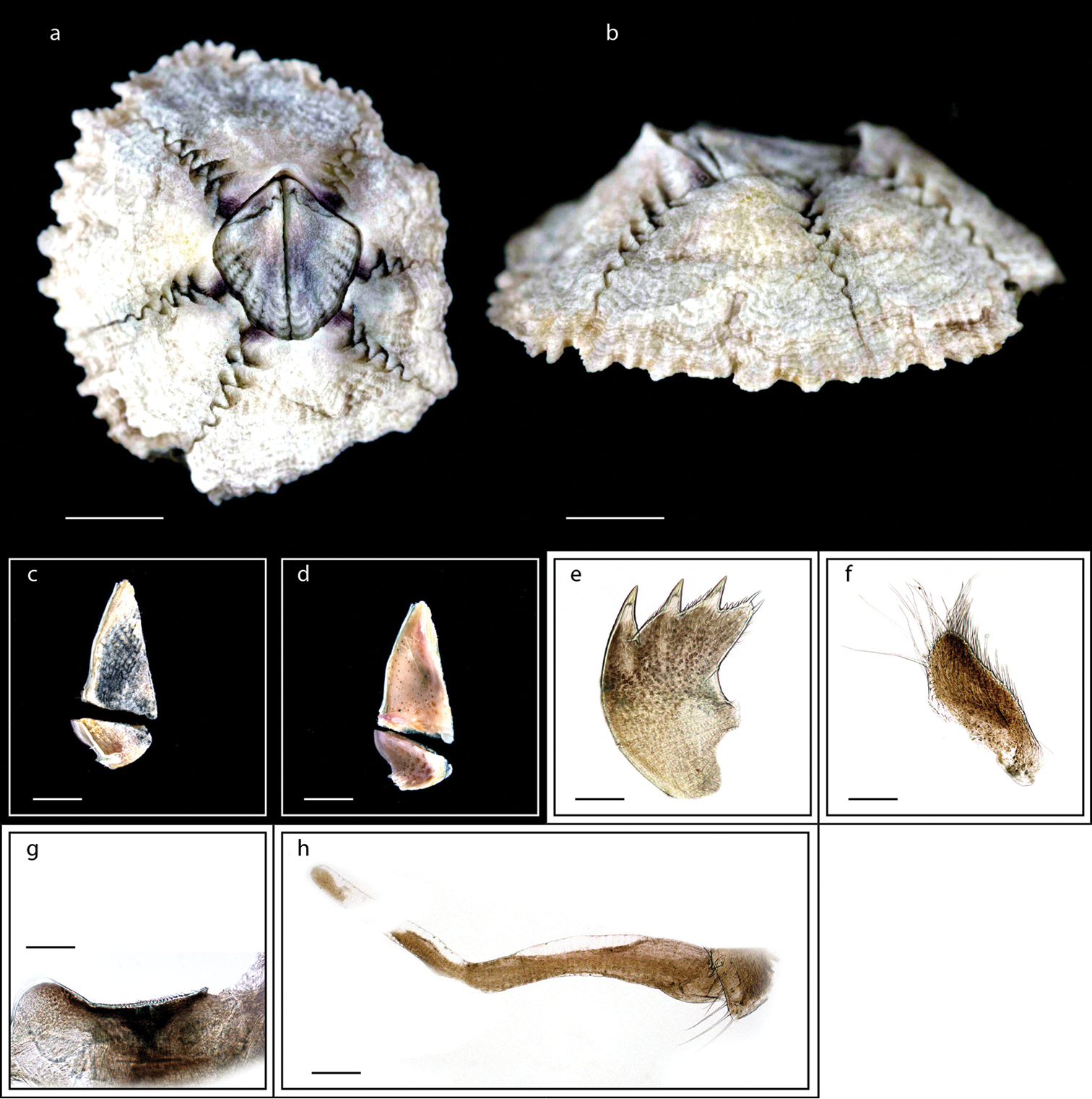
- Nesochthamalus intertextus

Scientific classification
- Domain: Eukaryota
- Kingdom: Animalia
- Phylum: Arthropoda
- Class: Thecostraca
- Subclass: Cirripedia
- Order: Balanomorpha
- Family: Chthamalidae
- Genus: Nesochthamalus; Foster & Newman, 1987
- Species: N. intertextus

Binomial name
- Nesochthamalus intertextus (Darwin, 1854)

Synonyms
- Chthamalus intertextus Darwin, 1854

= Nesochthamalus =

Genus of barnacles

The barnacle genus Nesochthamalus was erected by Foster & Newman, 1987, to include sole species Chthamalus intertextus originally named by Darwin in 1854. It is widespread on islands in Western Pacific Ocean, including Hawaii, and presents combinations of unusual features which make easily recognizable for field workers. These include dirty white shell exterior with deep purple colored interior, operculars colored purple. Opercular plates on each side calcify together in all but youngest individuals, and cannot be separated or easily distinguished from each other. This feature is shared only by Rehderella belyaevi, but in latter species, scutum and tergum can be distinguished by raised ridge replacing old articular margin. Unique feature of Nesochthamalus is its basis. In young individuals, it is entirely membraneous, and with age, becomes secondarily calcareous progressively inwards, leaving only the center membraneous. As the basis calcifies, it rises off the substrate forming a saucer shape when viewed from the side. In addition, interior of shell is secondarily calcified.

== Diagnosis and Discussion ==
Nesochthamalus intertextus is notable and distinctive in its outer shell and basis structure. General shape is flattened, with relatively large oval aperture. Crowded colonies do not become columnar, as in Chamaesipho. Unworn specimens are dirty white, and show vertical ribbing, prominent growth ridges, and wavy or chevroned sutures between shell plates. Because of its intertidal habitat, most specimens are eroded, particularly in their upper, older portions. As wear progresses, plate sutures become straighter. Interior of shell is colored deep violet, more intensely at plate sutures. This color only shows on exterior on unworn sections between ribs. Interior surface of shell plates is covered in small pits.

In young specimens, basis is entirely membraneous. As the animal grows, basis calcifies progressively inwards, leaving only central portion membraneous. As this happens, layers of secondary calcareous material form on inside of shell. This secondary calcification and basis are also colored purple, and serve to halt further enlargement of shell size. As calcification proceeds, outer parts of the animal are raised off substrate, showing convex, saucer-shaped side view.

Opercular plates are unusual in being completely fused on each side, with no trace left of scutal/tergal articulation, except in youngest individuals. Where scutum and tergum are separable, they are equal in size, and colored deep violet, with tergum darker than scutum. Tergum shows clear spur, and 4 tergal depressor muscle crests. Otherwise, these plates are nearly featureless, except for numerous pits on inside surface.

=== Synonymy and Nomenclature ===
==== Nesochthamalus ====
- Nesochthamalus Foster & Newman, 1987: 326, (Original Description): Poltarukha, 2006: 75, (discussion).
- Type species: Chthamalus intertextus Darwin, 1854: 467, by original designation.

==== Nesochthamalus intertextus ====
- Chthamalus intertextus Darwin, 1854: 467 (original description); Pope, 1965: 29; (extensive re-description, discussion).
- Nesochthamalus intertextus (Darwin). Foster & Newman, 1987: 326 (generic reassignment); Poltarukha, 1996: 993; 2006: 76; 2008: 75; (discussions, supplementary descriptions, habitat and range data).
- Euraphia intertexta (Darwin). Newman & Ross, 1976: 41; (complete reference list to 1976): Zevina et al., 1992: 79; (junior synonym).
- Type locality: "Philippine Archipelago; Mus. Cuming", as stated by Darwin's description, and verified by Pope, 1965:35 as type locality. In the 19th century, precise type localities were not given. Darwin did not give broad geographic ranges, and usually general locality given at beginning of species descriptions can be taken as type locality.
- Type specimens and repository: Pope, 1965 reported a group of specimens in British Museum (Natural History) labeled "Philippines - ex Museum Cuming" as probably type material. No holotype or lectotype has been selected.

== Habitat and Geographical Distribution ==
Nesochthamalus can be found in mid-littoral environments, and does not generally form densely packed colonies as are characteristic of Chamaesipho. Nesochthamalus intertextus is widespread on islands in West and Central Pacific Ocean. Southernmost reported occurrence is Port Moresby, New Guinea, and is absent from Australia. Other reports include Indonesia, Philippine Archipelago (type area), Taiwan, Japan, Okinawa, Ryukyu Islands, Fiji, Tuamotu, and Hawaii. It may be reasonably expected to be found throughout Micronesia and Melanesia.35 To this list can be added Vietnam.
