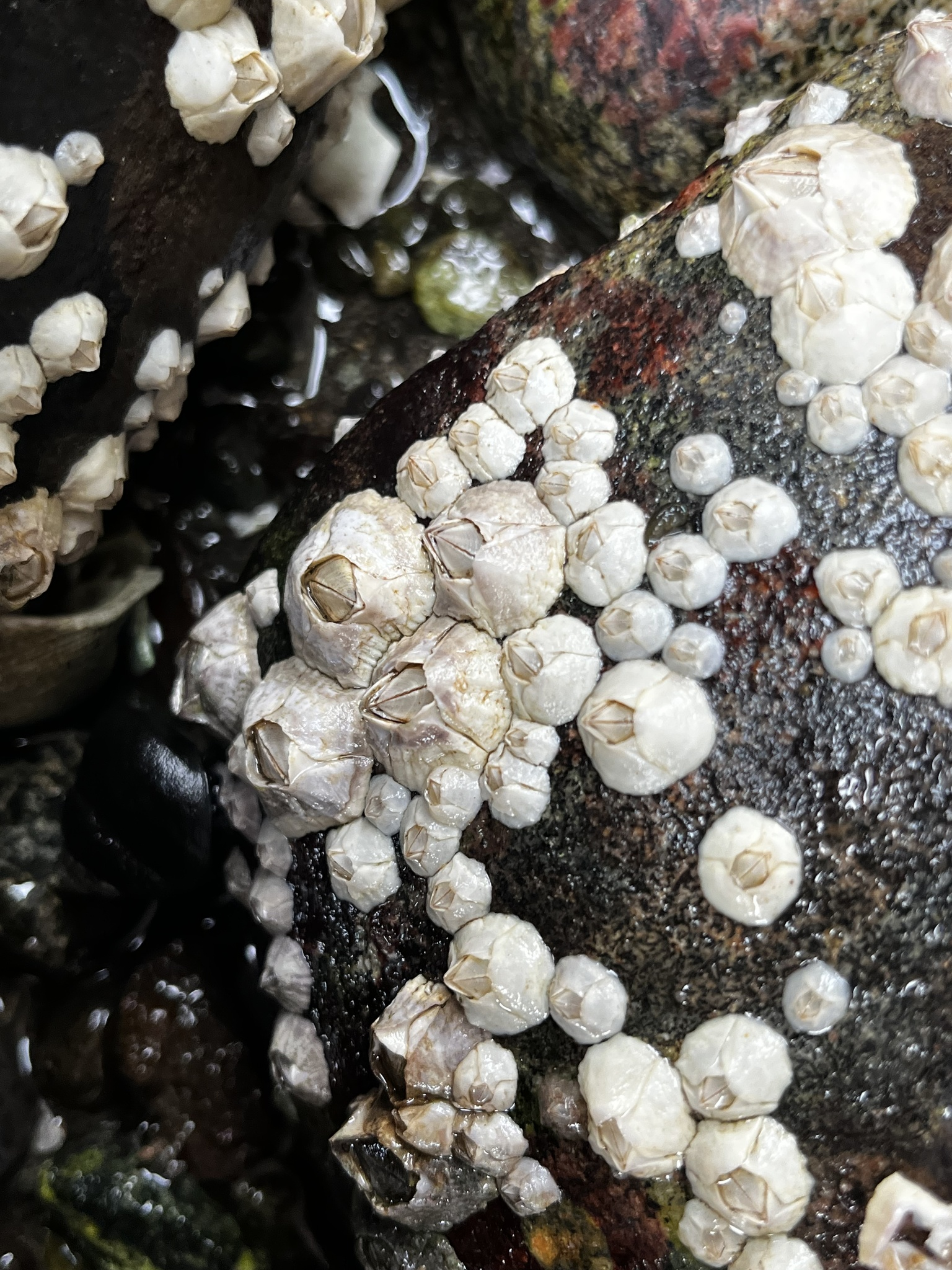

Scientific classification
- Kingdom: Animalia
- Phylum: Arthropoda
- Class: Thecostraca
- Subclass: Cirripedia
- Order: Balanomorpha
- Family: Elminiidae
- Genus: Elminius
- Species: E. kingii

Binomial name
- Elminius kingii Gray, 1831

= Elminius kingii =

Species of barnacle

Elminius kingii is a species of symmetrical sessile barnacle in the family Elminiidae.

== Description ==
Elminius kingii lives in the southeast Pacific Ocean and southwest Atlantic Ocean near Chile and Argentina. They lie in the depth range of 0–10 meters often found on rocks, shell and wood intertidal areas. Length, size and weight has not been recorded. Eggs hatch into planktonic nauplii and leave the mantel cavity. Then they undergo six naupliar instars succeed by non feeding cypris larva. Then thenaupy will metamorphism into adults.
