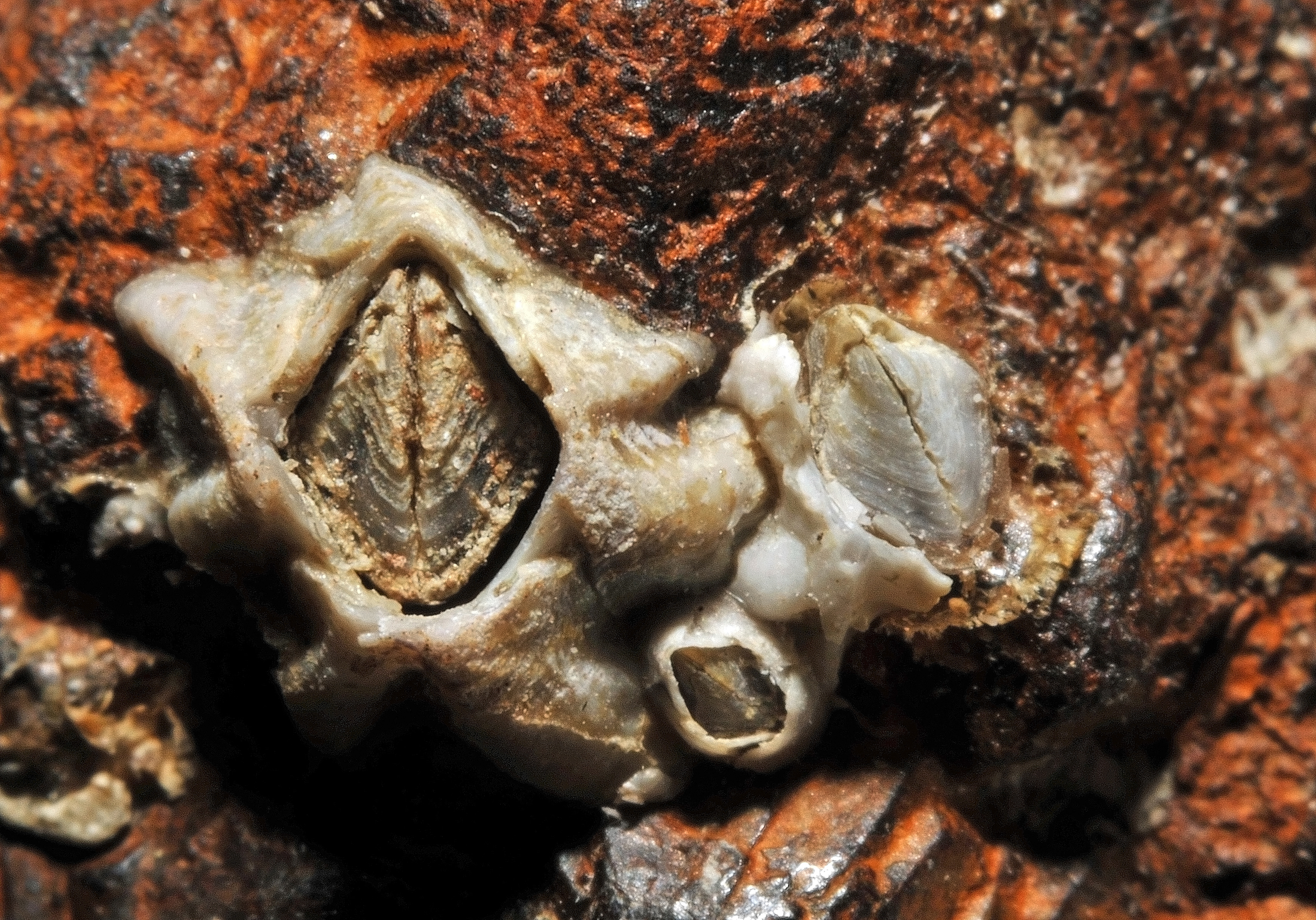
- Microeuraphia depressa, Portugal

Scientific classification
- Kingdom: Animalia
- Phylum: Arthropoda
- Class: Thecostraca
- Subclass: Cirripedia
- Order: Balanomorpha
- Family: Chthamalidae
- Genus: Microeuraphia
- Species: M. depressa

Binomial name
- Microeuraphia depressa (Poli, 1791)

= Microeuraphia depressa =

Species of crustaceans

Microeuraphia depressa is a species of star barnacle in the family Chthamalidae. This species has previously been classified in the genera Chthamalus and Euraphia.
