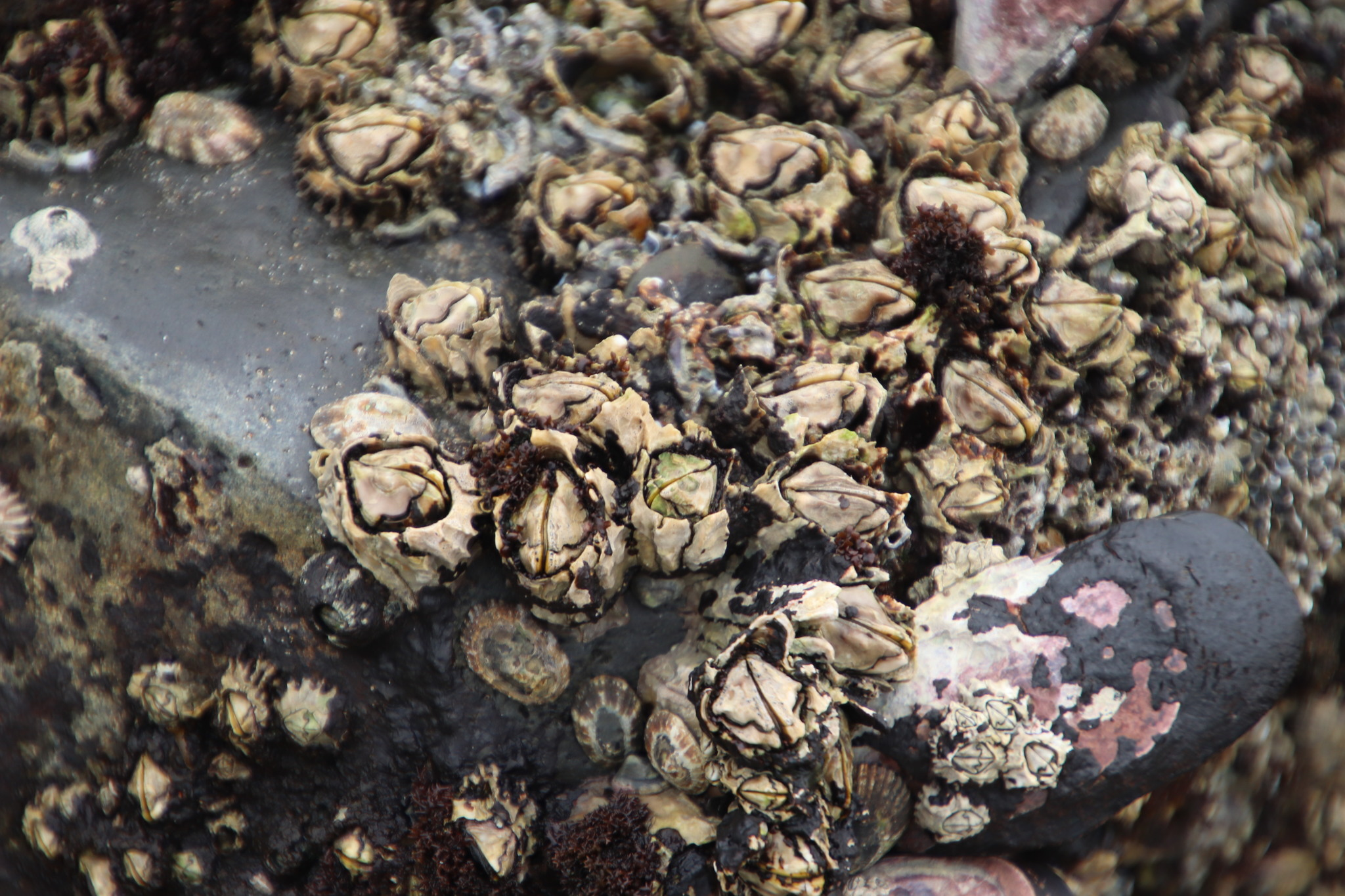
- Octomeris angulosa, eightshell barnacle, South Africa

Scientific classification
- Kingdom: Animalia
- Phylum: Arthropoda
- Class: Thecostraca
- Subclass: Cirripedia
- Order: Balanomorpha
- Family: Chthamalidae
- Genus: Octomeris
- Species: O. angulosa

Binomial name
- Octomeris angulosa (Sowerby, 1825)

= Octomeris angulosa =

Species of barnacle

Octomeris angulosa, the eightshell barnacle, is a species of star barnacle in the family Chthamalidae.
