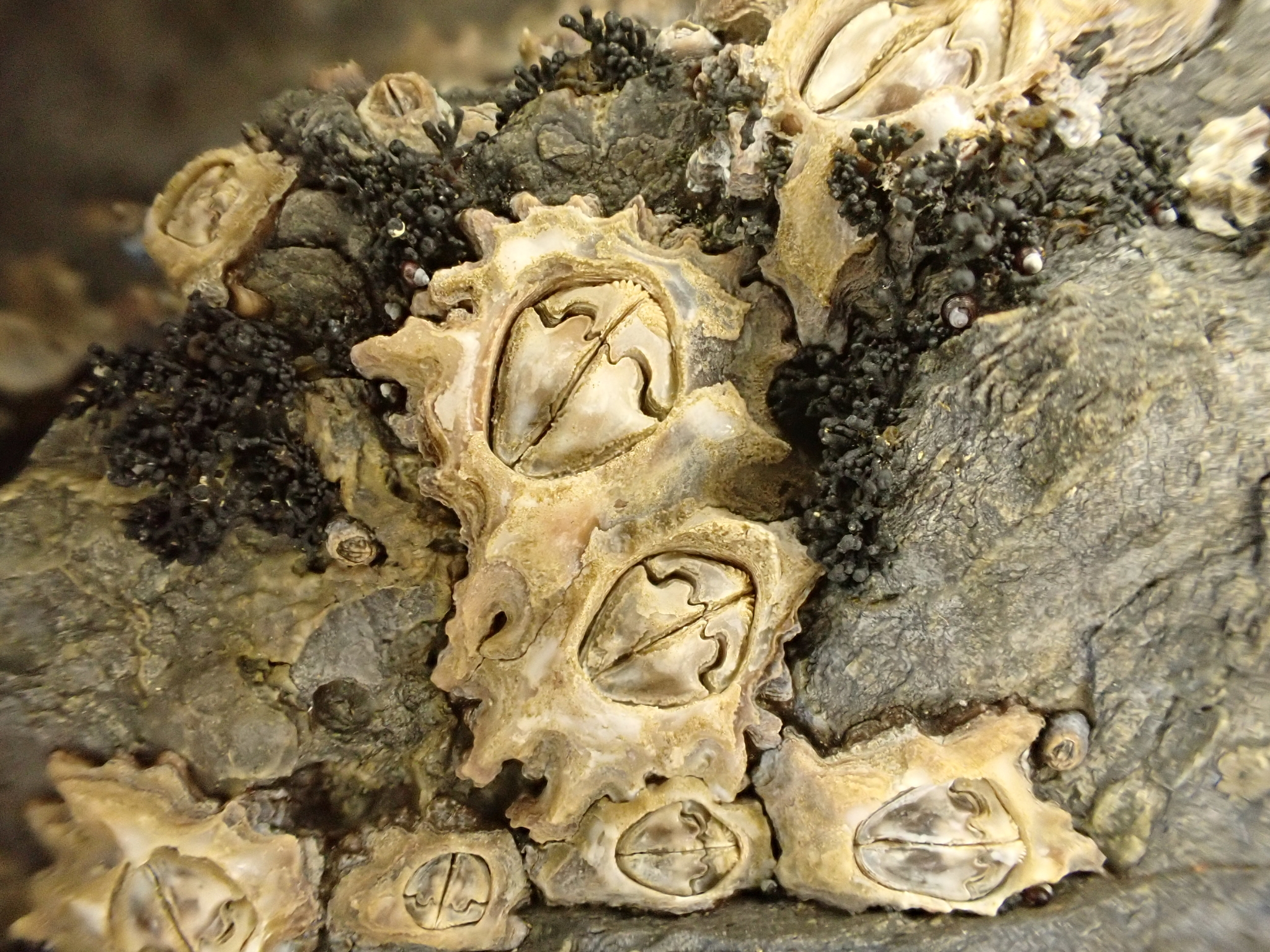

Scientific classification
- Domain: Eukaryota
- Kingdom: Animalia
- Phylum: Arthropoda
- Class: Thecostraca
- Subclass: Cirripedia
- Order: Balanomorpha
- Family: Chthamalidae
- Genus: Chamaesipho
- Species: C. brunnea

Binomial name
- Chamaesipho brunnea Moore, 1944

= Chamaesipho brunnea =

Chamaesipho brunnea Temporal range: Miocene–Recent

Species of barnacle

Chamaesipho brunnea is an intertidal barnacle common in New Zealand, in both the North Island and the South Island. Juveniles have six shell wall plates, reducing to four in adults, and with age, all plates become concrescent, with no trace of sutures inside or out. Shell is brown colored. The related, and sometimes associated Chamaesipho columna is much smaller in size, by nearly half, while Elminius, which can associate with both species, also has four shell wall plates, but plates remain distinct at all stages. The shell of C. columna corrodes to a pitted surface, while that of C. brunnea has a lamellar corrosion.

== Diagnosis and discussion ==
The shell in non-crowded specimens of Chamaesipho brunnea is usually low conic, brown with prominent growth ridges basally, corroded upper sections are whiter and smoother. Crowded individuals become columnar. Shell wall in juveniles, to 4 mm maximum diameter consists of six plates, which then reduce to four by fusion of carinolaterals with rostrolatera. Complete fusion of wall is accomplished by reproductive maturity, 5–6 mm diameter. No trace of plate sutures is visible inside or outside of shell. Adult shell plates are thick. Maximum size is about 19 mm rostrocarinal diameter, with aperture about 10 mm.

The scutum is wider than high, and distinguished by its comparatively large, rectangular articular ridge. The interior shows a smooth surface, with clearly defined shallow or deep adductor pit and shallow lateral depressor pit. Scutal adductor ridge, a character of the genus, is nearly absent, or poorly expressed. The tergum is trapezoidal, with protruding rounded articular ridge. There is no spur, and the interior is featureless except for about 7 prominent crests for the tergal depressor muscle. These crests are visible on the exterior.

Diagnostic soft part features include a dark brown body with black cirri, and mandible with three, sometimes four teeth. First tooth is separated from rest by large gap. The lower edge bears a row of fine bristles without larger teeth.

=== Nomenclature and synonymy ===
- Chamaesipho brunnea Moore, 1944:320 (original description); Newman & Ross, 1976:43 (complete reference list as at 1976); Poltarukha, 2006 (detailed supplemental description)
- non Chthamalus stellatus (Poli). Borradaile, 1916: 135
- Type locality: Lyall Bay, Wellington, New Zealand (approximately 41.331999°S 174.799261°E)
- Types: Holotype at Dominion Museum, New Zealand; paratypes reposed at Dominion Museum, Canterbury College, and Auckland Museum.
- Fossil record: Miocene (Otaian), New Zealand

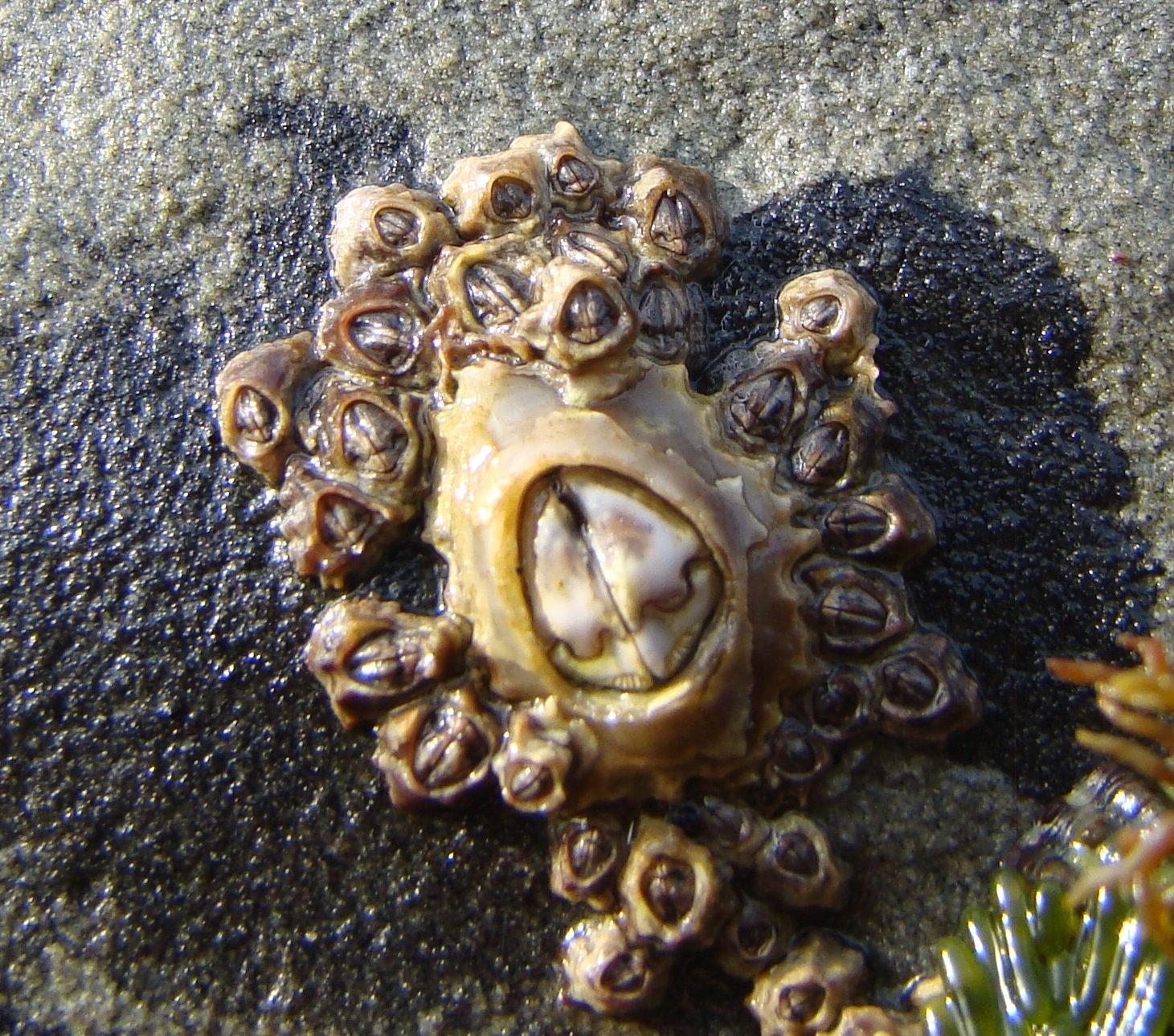

== Geography and environmental data ==
Intertidal, prefers exposed high energy locations between upper surf zone above high tide mark to neap tide level. In less agitated conditions, populations are less dense. Where range overlaps with that of Chamaesipho columna, C. brunnea will always be found above the zone of C. columna. In more protected areas, C. columna takes over.

Chamaesipho brunnea is found naturally only on New Zealand shores. Its range overlaps extensively with C. columna. All coasts of North Island fitting environmental preferences are colonized. On the South Island, it is not found on, or south of, Stewart Island. On the Chatham Islands, only C. brunnea is present. As this species breeds primarily in spring and summer, water temperatures may be controlling factor in distribution.
