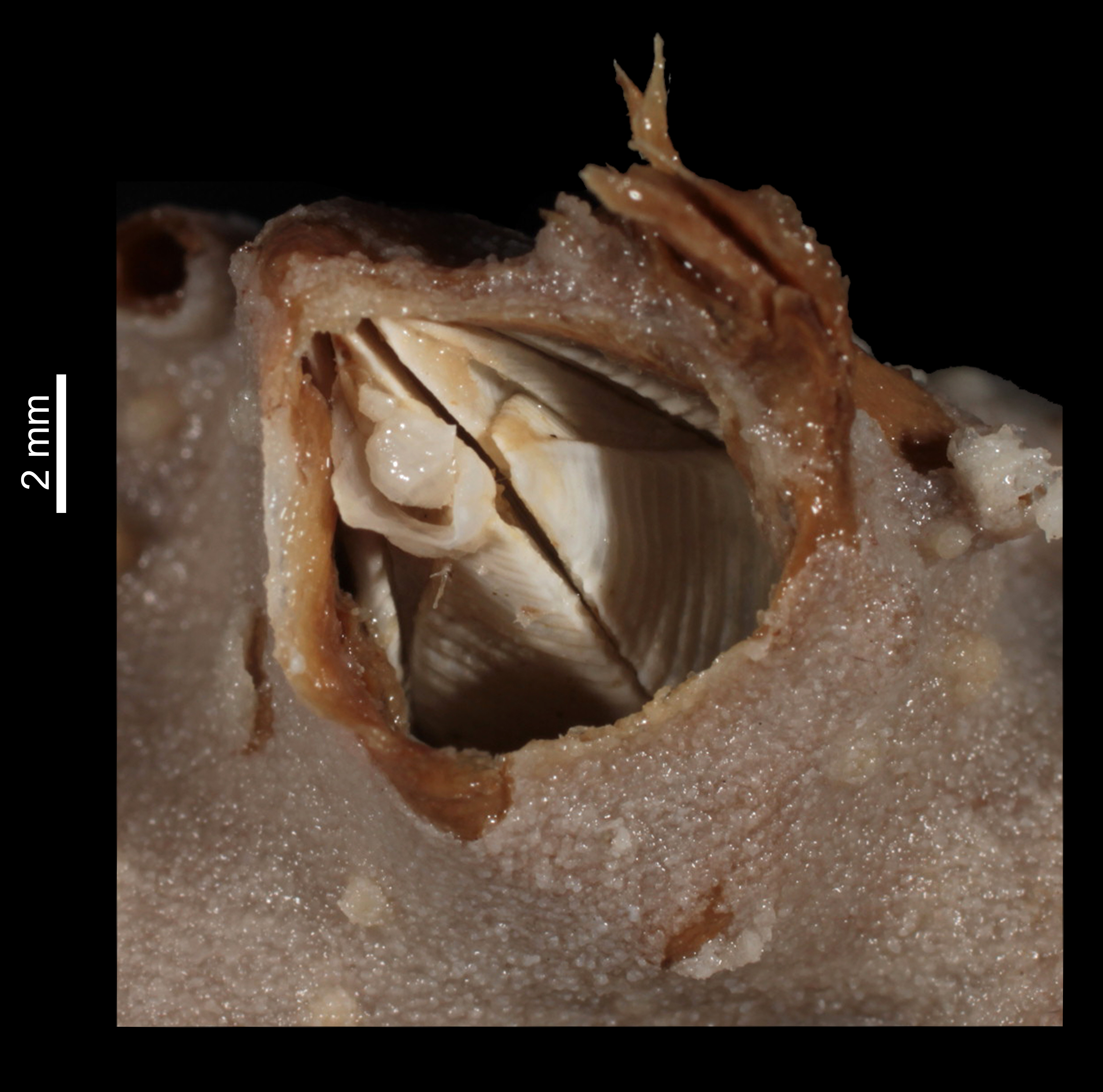
- Chionelasmus crosnieri, South Pacific

Scientific classification
- Kingdom: Animalia
- Phylum: Arthropoda
- Class: Thecostraca
- Subclass: Cirripedia
- Order: Balanomorpha
- Family: Chionelasmatidae
- Genus: Chionelasmus
- Species: C. crosnieri

Binomial name
- Chionelasmus crosnieri Buckeridge, 1998

= Chionelasmus crosnieri =

Species of barnacle

Chionelasmus crosnieri is a species of symmetrical sessile barnacle in the family Chionelasmatidae.
