= Euraphia hembeli =

Scientific classification
- Kingdom: Animalia
- Phylum: Arthropoda
- Clade: Pancrustacea
- Class: Thecostraca
- Subclass: Cirripedia
- Order: Balanomorpha
- Family: Chthamalidae
- Genus: Euraphia
- Species: E. hembeli

Binomial name
- Euraphia hembeli Conrad, 1837

Species of barnacle

Euraphia hembeli is a species of star barnacles in the family Chthamalidae. It was first described by Timothy Abbott Conrad in 1837. The species occurs throughout the Indo-Pacific, including the Cocos Islands and Pitcairn Islands, and has also been recorded in the Andaman Sea, the Malay Archipelago, and the Hawaiian Islands.

== Description ==
Euraphia hembeli is a sessile barnacle that attaches to hard surfaces in tropical marine environments. It has a conical shell and reaches a maximum length of approximately 7.5 cm. Like other members of the superorder Thoracica, it undergoes a planktonic larval stage before settling and metamorphosing into its adult form.

== Distribution and habitat ==
Euraphia hembeli occurs throughout the tropical Indo-Pacific. It is found in the Cocos Islands and Pitcairn Islands, and has also been recorded in the Andaman Sea, the Malay Archipelago, and the Hawaiian Islands. It attaches to hard substrates in intertidal coastal areas.
