= Euraphiinae =

Family of barnacles

In the past, Euraphiinae has been considered a subfamily of barnacles of the family Chthamalidae. Research published in 2021 by Chan et al. resulted in the genera of the three subfamilies Euraphiinae, Chthamalinae, and Notochthamalinae being assigned directly to the family, without subfamily groupings, and this subfamily is no longer used.
