= Tetrachthamalus =

Scientific classification
- Kingdom: Animalia
- Phylum: Arthropoda
- Class: Thecostraca
- Subclass: Cirripedia
- Order: Balanomorpha
- Family: Chthamalidae
- Genus: Tetrachthamalus; Newman, 1967

Genus of crustaceans

Tetrachthamalus is a genus of star barnacles in the family Chthamalidae. There are at least two described species in Tetrachthamalus.

== Species ==
These species belong to the genus Tetrachthamalus:

- Tetrachthamalus oblitteratus Newman, 1967
- Tetrachthamalus sinensis Ren, 1980
