= Pseudoeuraphia =

Scientific classification
- Kingdom: Animalia
- Phylum: Arthropoda
- Class: Thecostraca
- Subclass: Cirripedia
- Order: Balanomorpha
- Family: Chthamalidae
- Genus: Pseudoeuraphia; Poltarukha, 2000
- Species: P. montgomeryi

Binomial name
- Pseudoeuraphia montgomeryi (Foster, 1990)

Genus of crustaceans

Pseudoeuraphia is a genus of star barnacles in the family Chthamalidae. There is one described species in Pseudoeuraphia, P. montgomeryi.
