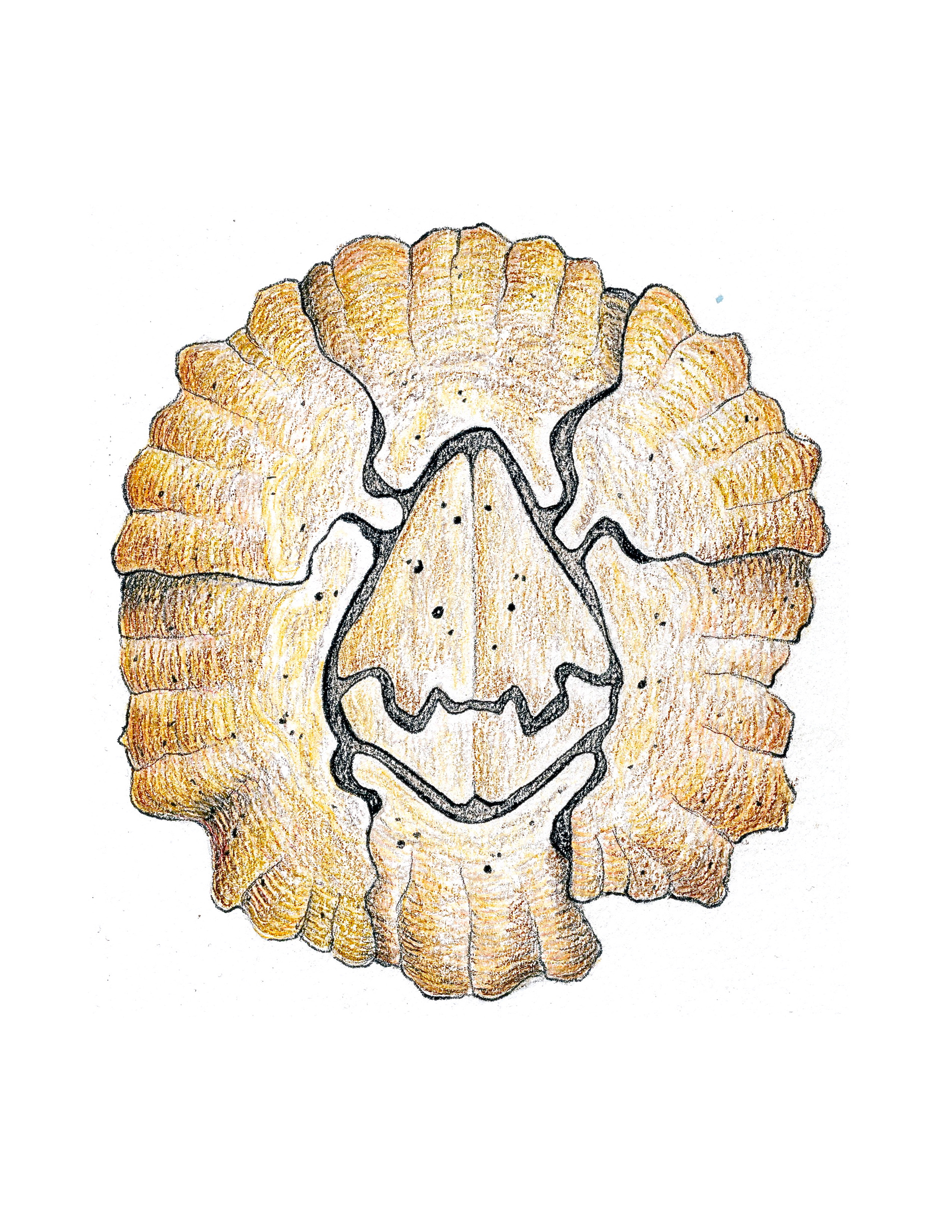
- Top view by Melissa Merrill

Scientific classification
- Kingdom: Animalia
- Phylum: Arthropoda
- Clade: Pancrustacea
- Class: Thecostraca
- Subclass: Cirripedia
- Order: Balanomorpha
- Family: Chthamalidae
- Genus: Notochthamalus; Foster & Newman, 1987
- Species: N. scabrosus

Binomial name
- Notochthamalus scabrosus (Darwin, 1854)

Synonyms
- Chthamalus scabrosus Darwin, 1854

= Notochthamalus =

Genus of barnacles

Notochthamalus scabrosus, the only species in the genus Notochthamalus, is a species of barnacle found along the south-western and south-eastern coasts of South America, from Peru to the Falkland Islands. The species is found almost exclusively higher in the intertidal zone than the mussel Perumytilus, often codistributed with the confamilial barnacle Jehlius cirratus and Balanus flosculus.

== Diagnosis and discussion ==
Three barnacles of Notochthamalus scabrosus (the one on the bottom left is of the genus Jehlius)

Notochthamalus is composed of 6 compartmental plates, composed of a carina, rostrum, and paired carinolatera and rostrolatera. Sutures between plates made up of poorly developed oblique folded laminae with membraneous basis. Plates are colored dull purplish brown, weathering to gray. Free-growing shellis are conic, crowded colonies become cylindrical, with plate sutures obscured. Opercular plates are narrow and deeply interlocked. The interior of the tergum shows a tergal depressor muscle pit with overhang and no crests, or only relics thereof. Neither shell nor opercular plates show secondary fusion with age. The best character for field identification are the undulations along the tergal-scutal margins. Given the overall appearance of the operculum of Notochthamalus, it is sometimes called the "vampire barnacle".

=== Nomenclature and synonymies ===
==== Notochthamalus ====
- Notochthamalus Foster & Newman, 1987; (original description).
- Type species: Chthamalus scabrosus Darwin, 1854: 468, original designation by Foster & Newman, 1987, and by monotypy.

==== Notochthamalus scabrosus ====
- Chthamalus scabrosus Darwin, 1854;468 (original description): Newman & Ross, 1976,42 (see for pre-1976 bibliography).
- Notochthamalus scabrosus (Darwin). Foster & Newman, 1987, (generic reassignment): Poltarukha, (discussion, supplementary description).
- Type locality: Not given in Darwin, 1854, or Pilsbry, 1916.
- Type specimens: Not given in Darwin, 1854. Pilsbry's 1916 reference specimens from Valparaíso, Chile are USNM No. 48089.323

== Geographic range and habitat ==
Notochthamalus scabrosus prefers exposed upper littoral habitats, and can be found on the South American coastline from Peru through Chile, Chiloe Archipelago, and Tierra del Fuego. It co-occurs there with Jehlius cirratus. In the Atlantic Ocean, it is very common on the Falkland Islands.468
