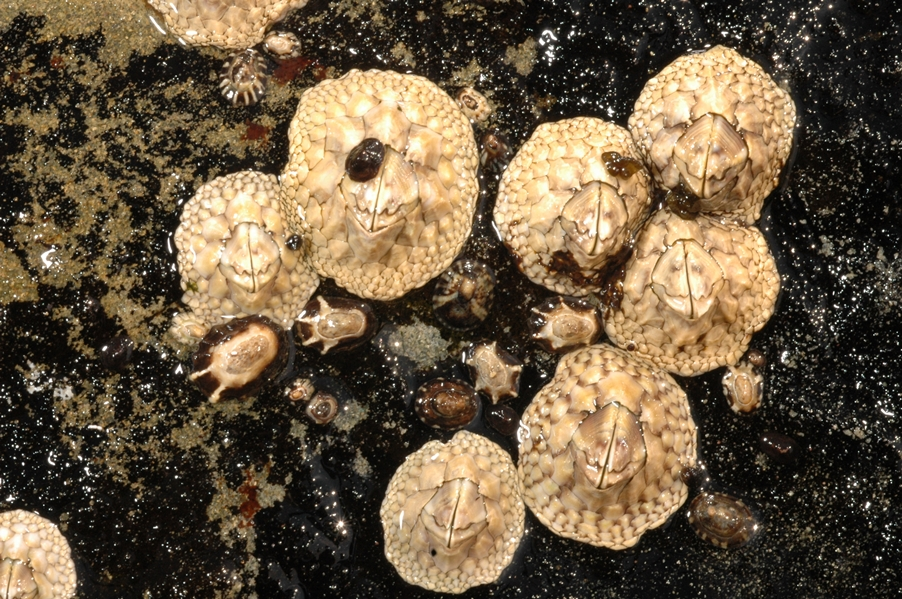
- Catomeris polymerus small cluster, not crowded. Picture is very clear, showing operculars, shell plates, and whorls of imbricating basal plates.

Scientific classification
- Kingdom: Animalia
- Phylum: Arthropoda
- Class: Thecostraca
- Subclass: Cirripedia
- Order: Balanomorpha
- Family: Catophragmidae
- Genus: Catomerus; Pilsbry, 1916
- Species: C. polymerus

Binomial name
- Catomerus polymerus (Darwin, 1854)

Synonyms
- Catophragmus polymerus Darwin, 1854

= Catomerus =

Genus of barnacles

Catomerus is a monotypic genus of intertidal/shallow water acorn barnacle that is found in warm temperate waters of Australia. The genus and species is very easily identified by whorls of small plates surrounding the base of the primary shell wall; no other shoreline barnacle species in the Southern Hemisphere has that feature. This species is considered to be a relic, as these plates are found only in primitive living lineages of acorn barnacles or in older fossil species. The fact that this is an intertidal species is unusual, because living primitive relic species are often found in more isolated habitats such as deep ocean basins and abyssal hydrothermal vents.

== Diagnosis and discussion ==
Catomerus is characterized by eight primary shell wall plates, with the rostrolatus entering the sheath, a membraneous basis, and up to eight whorls of basal imbricating plates. The imbricating plates are strongly carinate medially, and are reduced in height, extending only partly up the shell wall. The scutum has a well defined lateral depressor muscle depression.

The opercular plate and soft part morphology were re-described in detail by Poltarukha, 2006. A full synonymy of C. polymerus as at 1976 is provided by Newman & Ross, 197640

Unlike all other known Balanomorpha, Catomerus has both ovigerous frenae and ovigerous branchiae. This is a plesiomorphic condition, as ovigerous frenae are a characteristic of pedunculate barnacles. This structure is not reported in the structurally less derived Chionelasmatidae or Pachylasmatidae. The ovigerous structures, as folds (branchiae) or finger-like projections (frenae) are tissues to which fertilized eggs adhere to incubate.

== Nomenclature ==
- Type species: Catophragmus polymerus (Darwin, 1854):487
  - Fixation: monotypy by Pilsbry, 1916:335
- Type locality: Living, Twofold Bay, New South Wales, Australia (37°30′S 149°55′E, approximately)
- Holotype: British Museum

== Habitat and geography ==
The maximum observed geographic range of Catomerus is from New South Wales to Western Australia, and Tasmania, where it mostly inhabits the northern coast. Within this range, occurrences are not continuous, and apparently constrained by temperature, substrate preference, and wave action. Catomerus will not grow around abundant mussels.

Catomerus prefers warm temperate seas, and breeds mainly during the austral winter, at temperatures ranging from 14 °C to 17 °C, and sublittoral to lower eulittoral water depths.
