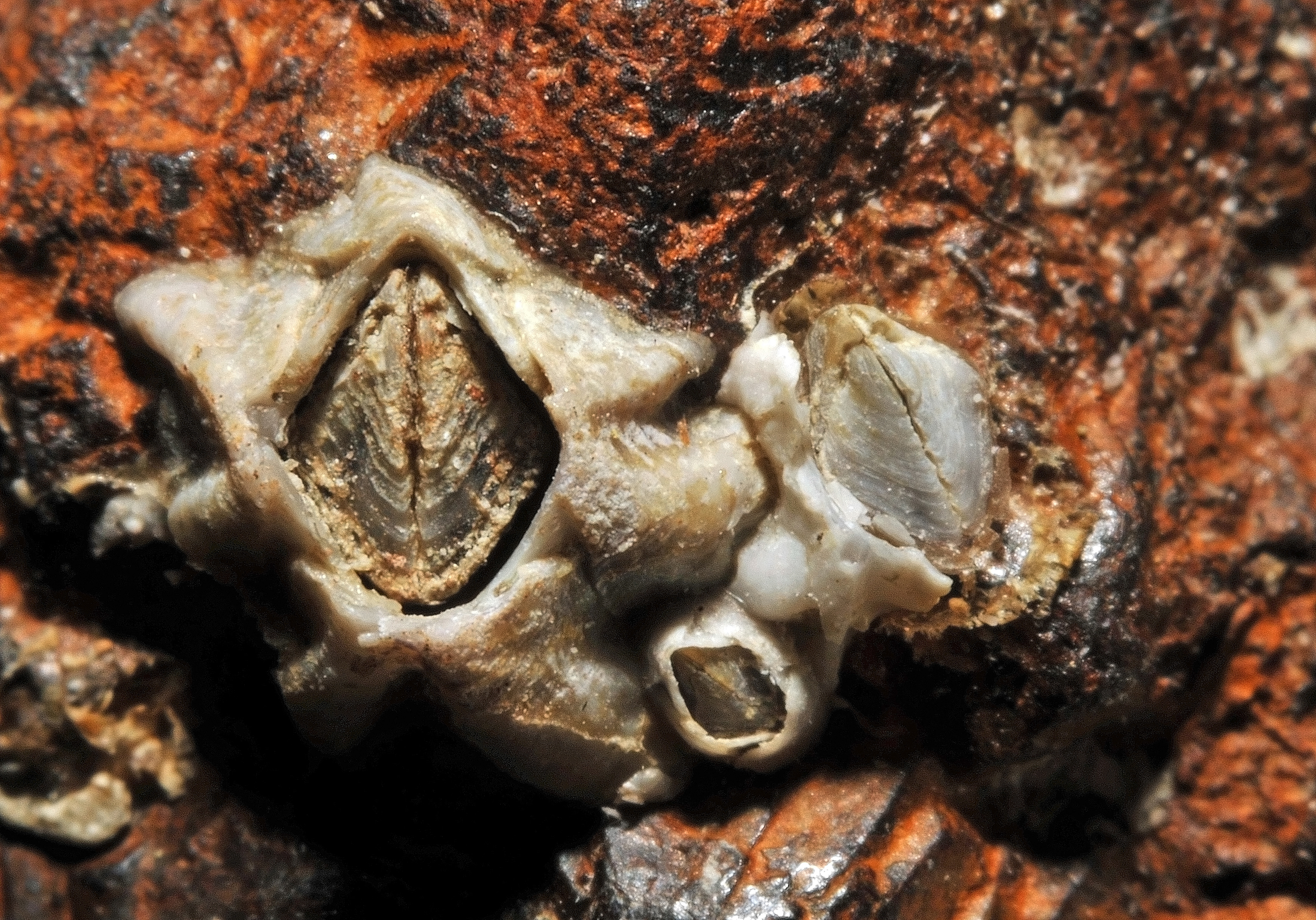
- Microeuraphia depressa, Portugal

Scientific classification
- Kingdom: Animalia
- Phylum: Arthropoda
- Class: Thecostraca
- Subclass: Cirripedia
- Order: Balanomorpha
- Family: Chthamalidae
- Genus: Microeuraphia; Poltarukha, 1997

= Microeuraphia =

Genus of crustaceans

Microeuraphia is a genus of star barnacles in the family Chthamalidae. There are about eight described species in Microeuraphia.

== Species ==
These species belong to the genus Microeuraphia:

- Microeuraphia aestuarii (Stubbings, 1963)
- Microeuraphia apelloefi (Nilsson-Cantell, 1921)
- Microeuraphia depressa (Poli, 1791)
- Microeuraphia eastropacensis (Laguna, 1987)
- Microeuraphia imperatrix (Pilsbry, 1916)
- Microeuraphia permitini (Zevina & Litinova, 1970)
- Microeuraphia rhizophorae (De Oliveira, 1940)
- Microeuraphia withersi (Pilsbry, 1916)
