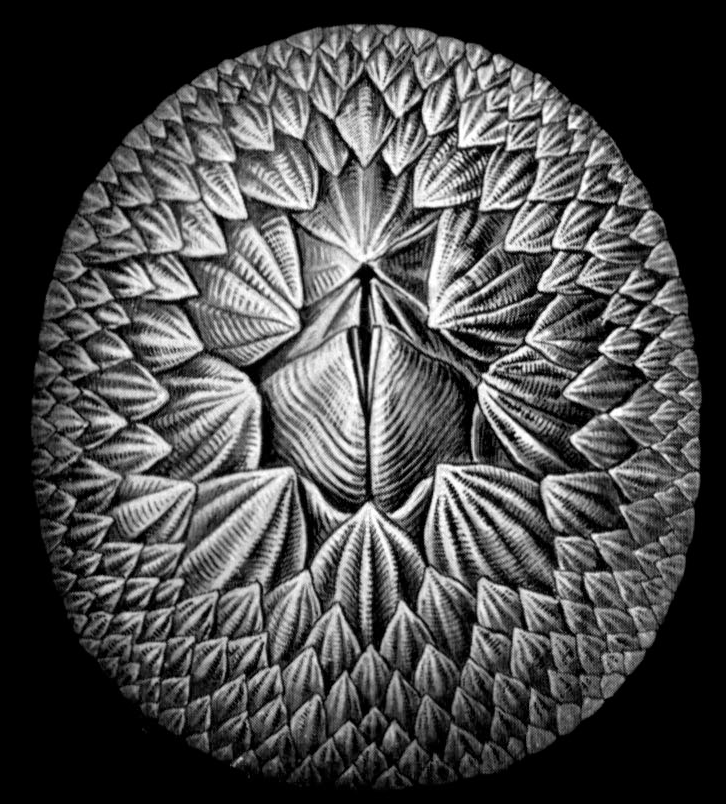

Scientific classification
- Kingdom: Animalia
- Phylum: Arthropoda
- Clade: Pancrustacea
- Class: Thecostraca
- Subclass: Cirripedia
- Order: Balanomorpha
- Family: Catophragmidae
- Genus: Catophragmus; Sowerby, 1826
- Species: C. imbricatus

Binomial name
- Catophragmus imbricatus Sowerby I, 1827

= Catophragmus =

Genus of barnacles

Catophragmus is one of three genera of the family Catophragmidae. It is a shallow water acorn barnacle of the Tropical Western Atlantic and Caribbean. It characterized by small accessory imbricating plates surrounding the base of the shell wall. It is monotypical.

== Characteristics ==
The shell wall has eight free plates, with no fusion, all entering the sheath. In contrast to Catolasmus, the other Northern Hemisphere catophragmid genus, imbricating plates extend only partway up the primary shell wall, and usually have four whorls, as opposed to 10. Many specimens have been recovered with few or no accessory remaining plates. The imbricating whorls are small and apparently deciduous, explained as a result of grazing gastropods.

The base is calcareous, thin, and solid. Where the base attaches to the shell wall, cavities matching small teeth are evident on the basal edge of the wall plates.

The scutum differs from Catolasmus in showing a well defined lateral depressor muscle pit. The labrum bears teeth and bristles, unlike Catolasmus.

Sowerby's publication appeared in either 1826 or 1827. Sykes (1906) concluded 1826 was the correct date.

== Nomenclature ==
- Type species: Catophragmus imbricatus Sowerby, 1826
  - Fixation: monotypy, by Sowerby, 1826
- Type locality: Antigua, leeward Islands, (17°09′N 61°49′W), attached to shell of Tetraclita porosa
- Types: two specimens in the British Museum

== Habitat ==
C^{.} imbricatus inhabits the lower littoral zone throughout the Western Atlantic (Bermuda) and West Indies. Although originally found on Antigua, it was not present there in 1998. Ross and Newman reported occurrences in Cuba, Cozumel, and Islota Aves. These populations show sufficient differences in morphology to possibly represent 2 or more species.
