= Catophragmidae =

Catophragmidae Temporal range: Cretaceous–recent

Scientific classification
- Kingdom: Animalia
- Phylum: Arthropoda
- Clade: Pancrustacea
- Class: Thecostraca
- Subclass: Cirripedia
- Order: Balanomorpha
- Superfamily: Chthamaloidea
- Family: Catophragmidae; Utinomi, 1968 nom. trans. Newman & Ross, 197636

Family of barnacles

The Catophragmidae are a family of barnacles in the superfamily Chthamaloidea with eight shell wall plates (a rostrum plate, carinal plates, paired rostrolateral plates, carinolateral plates I and II), surrounded by several whorls of imbricating plates. The basis is membranous.

This family occupies lower to upper midlittoral warm seas of the Pacific Coast of Central America, Caribbean, Bermuda, and Australia/Tasmania. These populations are highly disjunct and can be seen as relictual.

The family contains these genera: All genera are at present monotypic.

- Catolasmus Ross & Newman, 2001
- Catomerus Pilsbry, 1916
- Catophragmus Sowerby, 1827

The Catophragmidae have historically suffered from a lack of systematic attention. Ross and Newman, 2001 published a revision of the family, proposing one new genus and creating two subfamilies: Catophragminae in the northern hemisphere and Catomerinae in the southern hemisphere. The family was discussed as representing very early balanomorph lineages. The known species conserve many plesiomorphic traits. In 2021, a reclassification by Chan et al. resulted in the removal of the subfamilies and one genus.
