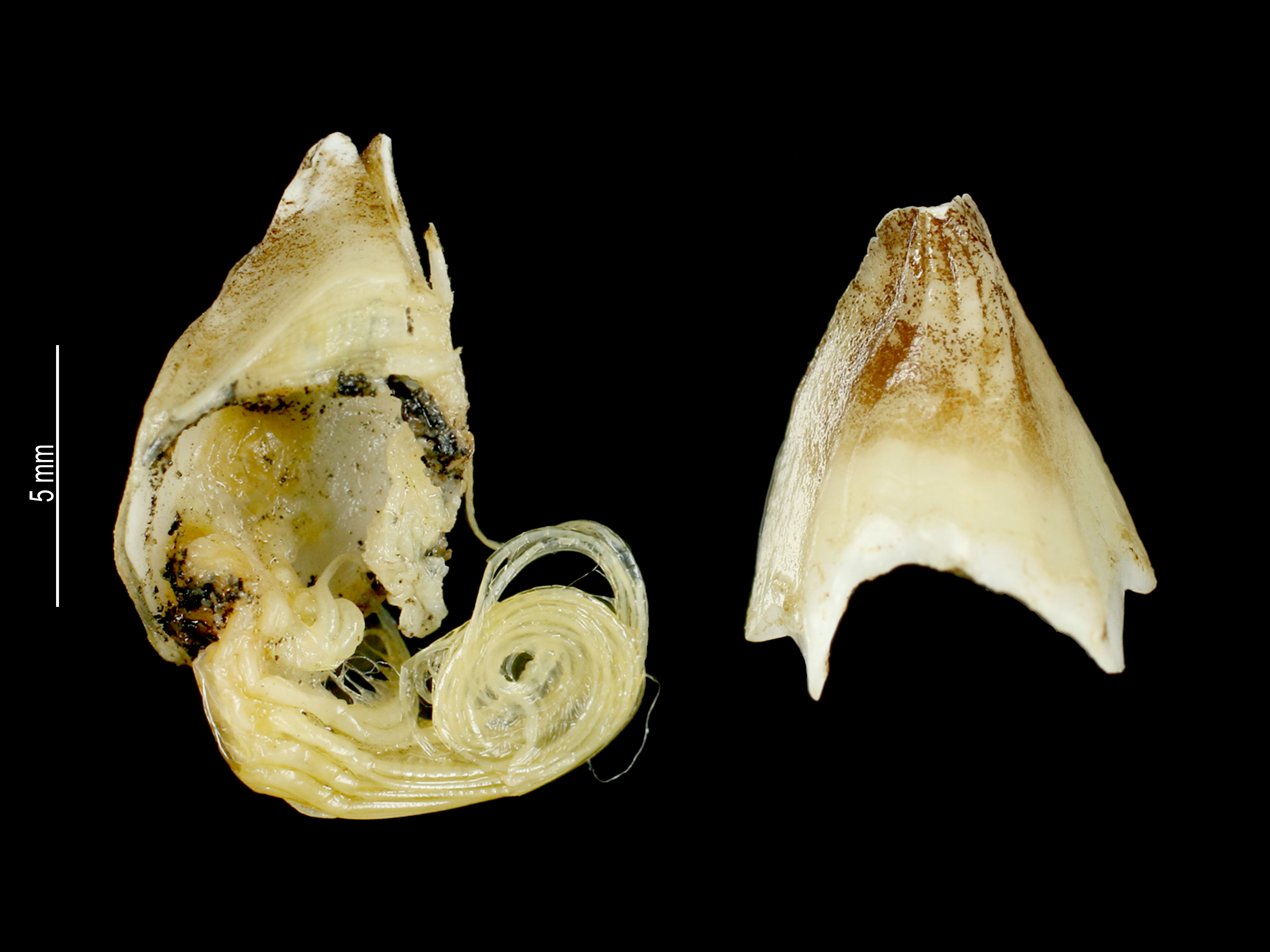
- Eochionelasmus ohtai, North Fiji Basin, Japan, depth 1990m

Scientific classification
- Kingdom: Animalia
- Phylum: Arthropoda
- Class: Thecostraca
- Subclass: Cirripedia
- Order: Balanomorpha
- Family: Chionelasmatidae
- Genus: Eochionelasmus; Yamaguchi, 1990

= Eochionelasmus =

Genus of crustaceans

Eochionelasmus is a genus of symmetrical sessile barnacles in the family Chionelasmatidae. There are at least two described species in Eochionelasmus.

== Species ==
These species belong to the genus Eochionelasmus:

- Eochionelasmus ohtai Yamaguchi, 1990
- Eochionelasmus paquensis Yamaguchi & Newman, 1997
