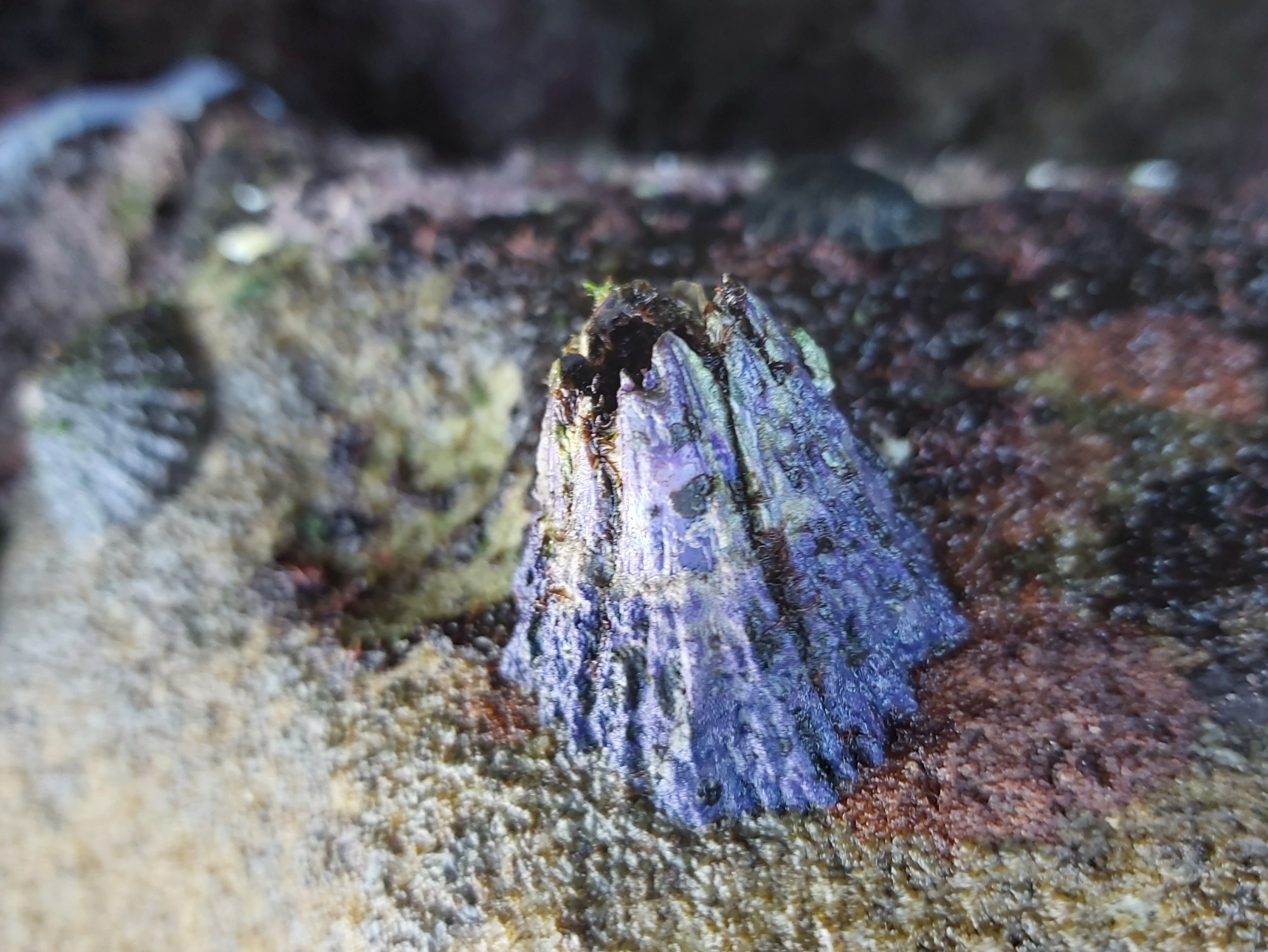

Scientific classification
- Kingdom: Animalia
- Phylum: Arthropoda
- Class: Thecostraca
- Subclass: Cirripedia
- Order: Balanomorpha
- Family: Austrobalanidae
- Genus: Austrobalanus
- Species: A. imperator

Binomial name
- Austrobalanus imperator (Darwin, 1854)

= Austrobalanus imperator =

Species of barnacle

Austrobalanus imperator is a species of barnacle in the family Austrobalanidae. It is endemic to Australia and occurs on the east coast (New South Wales, Queensland).

== Subspecies ==
These subspecies belong to the species Austrobalanus imperator:

- Austrobalanus imperator aotea Buckeridge, 1983
- Austrobalanus imperator imperator (Darwin, 1854)
