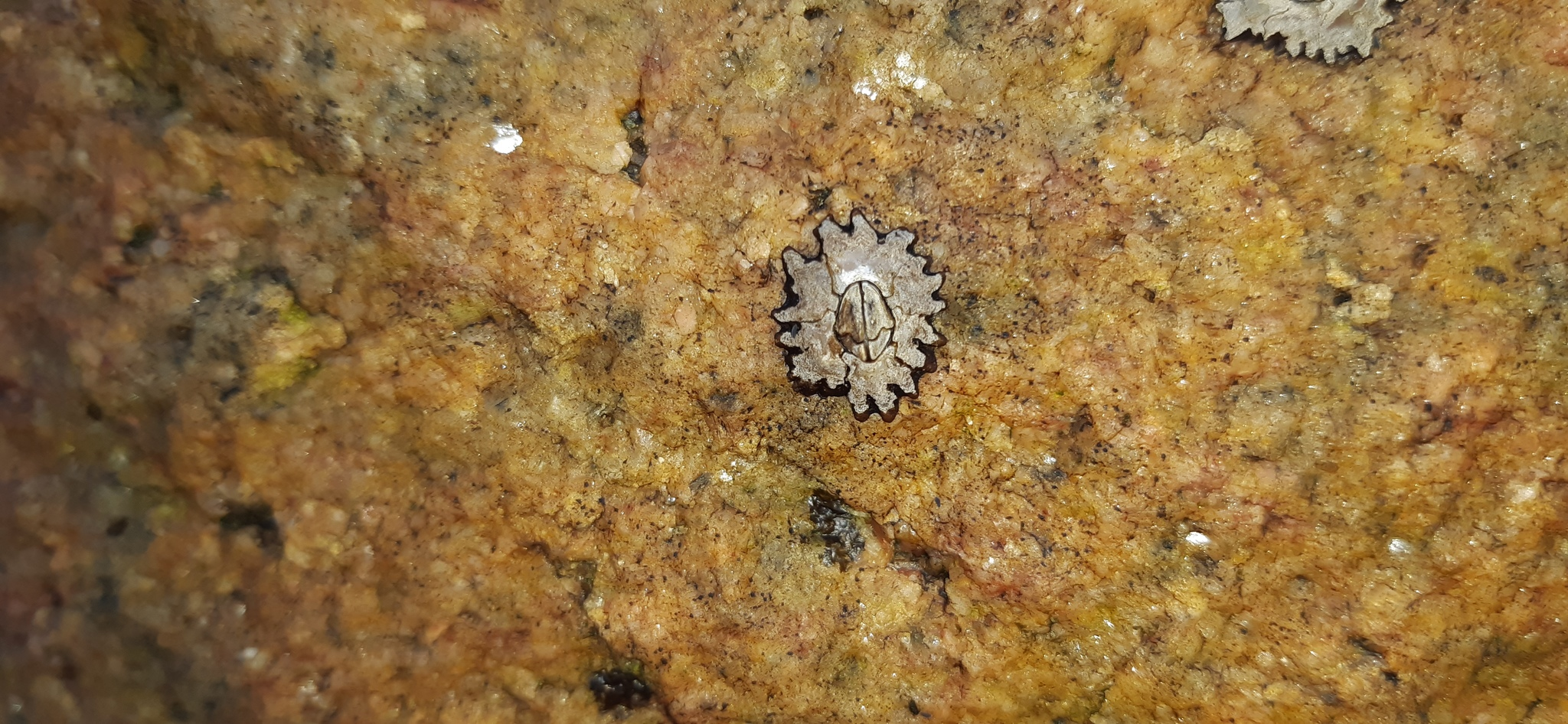
- Jehlius cirratus, Chile

Scientific classification
- Kingdom: Animalia
- Phylum: Arthropoda
- Class: Thecostraca
- Subclass: Cirripedia
- Order: Balanomorpha
- Family: Chthamalidae
- Genus: Jehlius
- Species: J. cirratus

Binomial name
- Jehlius cirratus (Darwin, 1854)

= Jehlius cirratus =

Species of crustaceans

Jehlius cirratus is a species of star barnacle in the family Chthamalidae. This species was formerly in the genus Chthamalus.
