= Euraphia =

Scientific classification
- Kingdom: Animalia
- Phylum: Arthropoda
- Class: Thecostraca
- Subclass: Cirripedia
- Order: Balanomorpha
- Family: Chthamalidae
- Genus: Euraphia; Conrad, 1837

Genus of crustaceans

Euraphia is a genus of star barnacles in the family Chthamalidae. There are at least three described species in Euraphia.

== Species ==
These species belong to the genus Euraphia:

- Euraphia calcareobasis (Henry, 1957)
- Euraphia devaneyi Foster & Newman, 1987
- Euraphia hembeli Conrad, 1837
