= Caudoeuraphia =

Scientific classification
- Kingdom: Animalia
- Phylum: Arthropoda
- Class: Thecostraca
- Subclass: Cirripedia
- Order: Balanomorpha
- Family: Chthamalidae
- Genus: Caudoeuraphia; Poltarukha, 1997
- Species: C. caudata

Binomial name
- Caudoeuraphia caudata (Pilsbry, 1916)

Genus of crustaceans

Caudoeuraphia is a genus of star barnacles in the family Chthamalidae. There is one described species in Caudoeuraphia, C. caudata.
