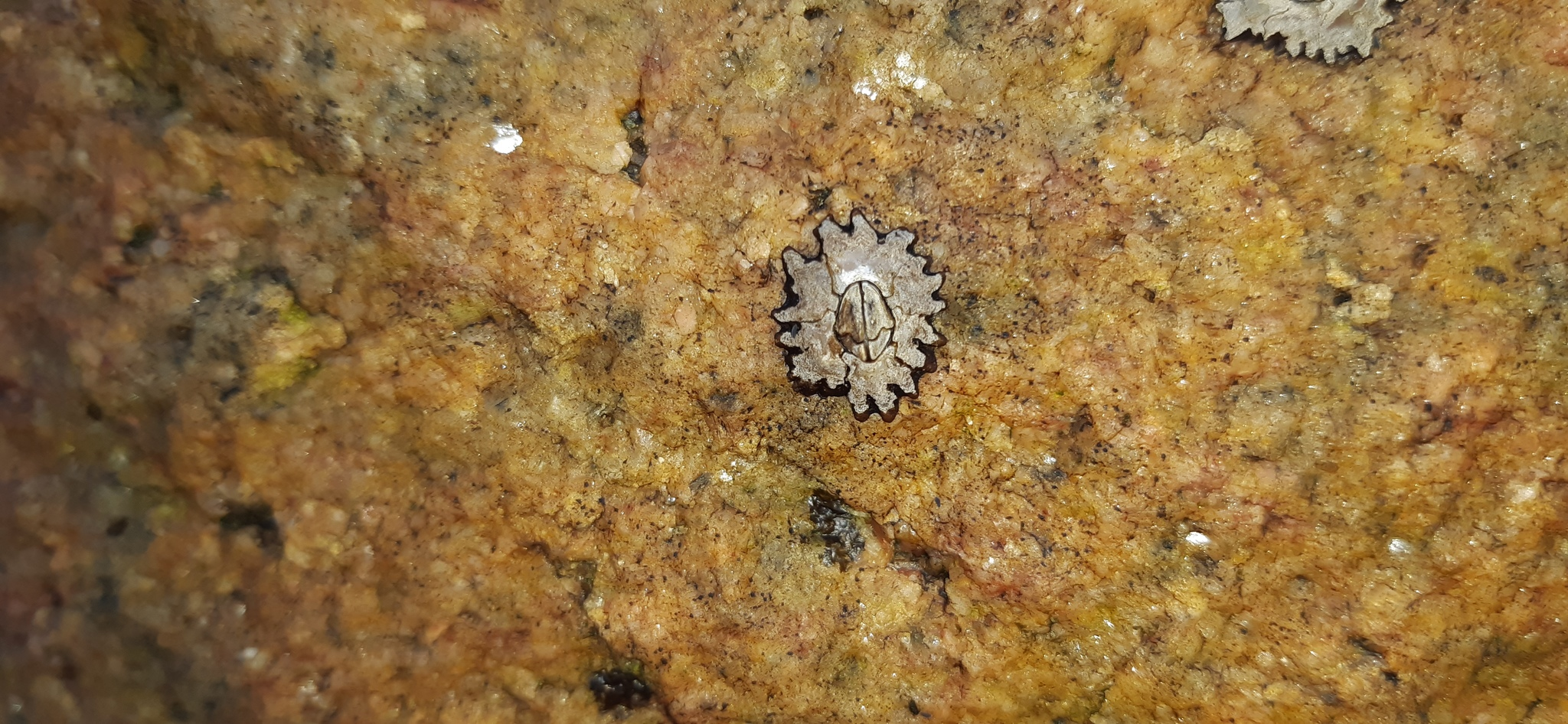
- Jehlius cirratus

Scientific classification
- Kingdom: Animalia
- Phylum: Arthropoda
- Class: Thecostraca
- Subclass: Cirripedia
- Order: Balanomorpha
- Family: Chthamalidae
- Genus: Jehlius; Ross, 1971

= Jehlius =

Genus of crustaceans

Jehlius is a genus of star barnacles in the family Chthamalidae. There are at least two described species in Jehlius.

== Species ==
These species belong to the genus Jehlius:

- Jehlius cirratus (Darwin, 1854)
- Jehlius gilmorei Ross, 1971
