= Hexechamaesipho =

Scientific classification
- Kingdom: Animalia
- Phylum: Arthropoda
- Clade: Pancrustacea
- Class: Thecostraca
- Subclass: Cirripedia
- Order: Balanomorpha
- Family: Chthamalidae
- Genus: Hexechamaesipho; Poltarukha, 1996
- Species: H. pilsbryi

Binomial name
- Hexechamaesipho pilsbryi (Hiro, 1936)

Genus of crustaceans

Hexechamaesipho is a genus of star barnacles in the family Chthamalidae. There is one described species in Hexechamaesipho, H. pilsbryi.
