= Chinochthamalus =

Scientific classification
- Kingdom: Animalia
- Phylum: Arthropoda
- Class: Thecostraca
- Subclass: Cirripedia
- Order: Balanomorpha
- Family: Chthamalidae
- Genus: Chinochthamalus; Foster, 1980
- Species: C. scutelliformis

Binomial name
- Chinochthamalus scutelliformis (Darwin, 1854)

Genus of crustaceans

Chinochthamalus is a genus of star barnacles in the family Chthamalidae. There is one described species in Chinochthamalus, C. scutelliformis.
