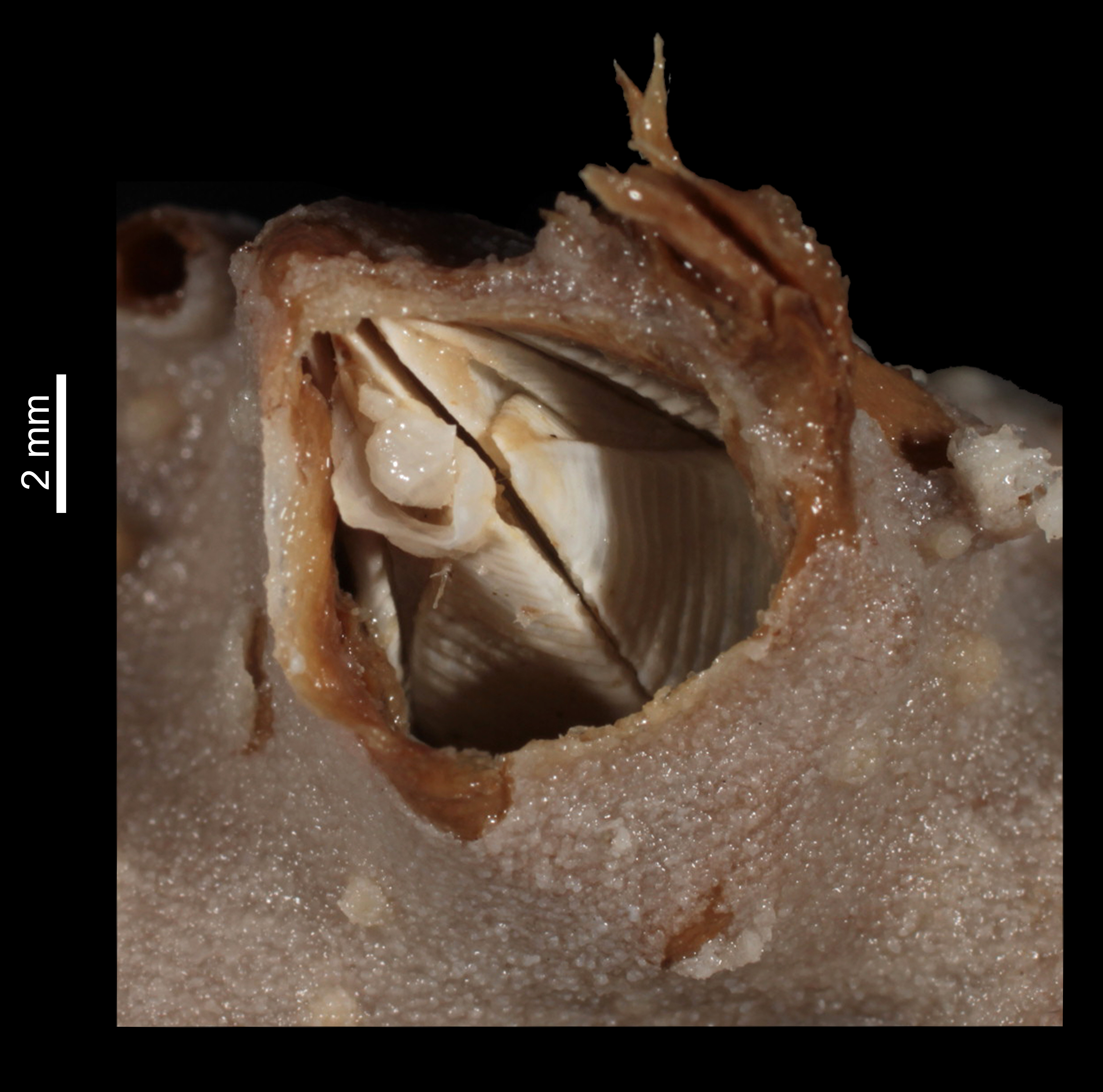
- Chionelasmus crosnieri, South Pacific

Scientific classification
- Kingdom: Animalia
- Phylum: Arthropoda
- Clade: Pancrustacea
- Class: Thecostraca
- Subclass: Cirripedia
- Order: Balanomorpha
- Family: Chionelasmatidae
- Genus: Chionelasmus; Pilsbry, 1911

= Chionelasmus =

Genus of crustaceans

Chionelasmus is a genus of symmetrical sessile barnacles in the family Chionelasmatidae. There are at least two described species in Chionelasmus.

== Species ==
These species belong to the genus Chionelasmus:

- Chionelasmus crosnieri Buckeridge, 1998
- Chionelasmus darwini (Pilsbry, 1907)
