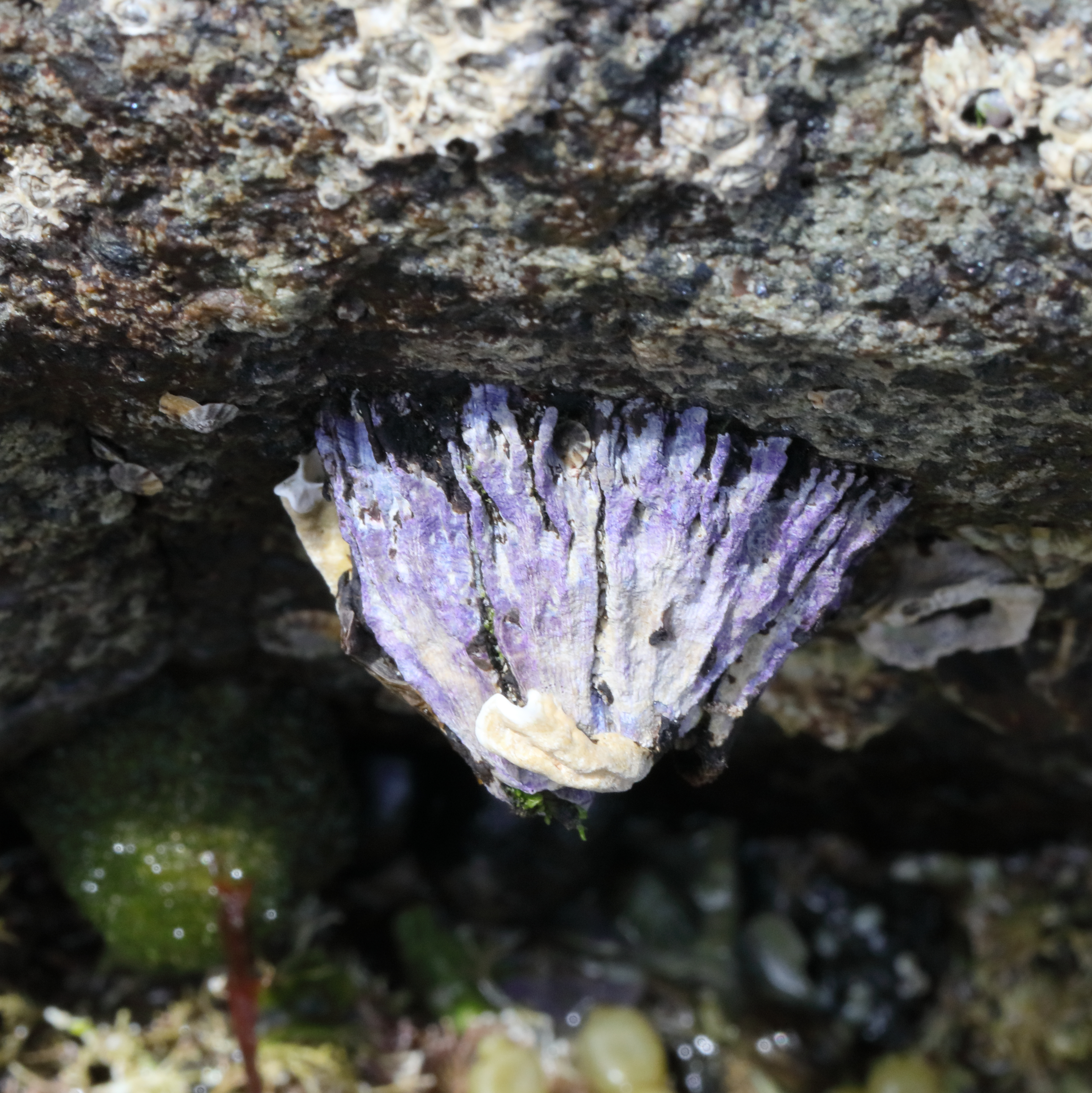
- Austrobalanus imperator, Australia

Scientific classification
- Kingdom: Animalia
- Phylum: Arthropoda
- Class: Thecostraca
- Subclass: Cirripedia
- Order: Balanomorpha
- Superfamily: Coronuloidea
- Family: Austrobalanidae; Newman & Ross, 1976
- Genus: Austrobalanus; Pilsbry, 1916

= Austrobalanus =

Austrobalanus Temporal range: Lutetian - Present, 47.8–0 Ma

Genus of crustaceans

Austrobalanus is a genus of symmetrical sessile barnacles in the family Austrobalanidae, the sole genus of the family. There are three described species in Austrobalanus, one of which is only known from the fossil record.

== Species ==
These species belong to the genus Austrobalanus:

- † Austrobalanus antarcticus Buckeridge, 2000
- Austrobalanus imperator (Darwin, 1854)
- Austrobalanus macdonaldensis Buckeridge, 1983
