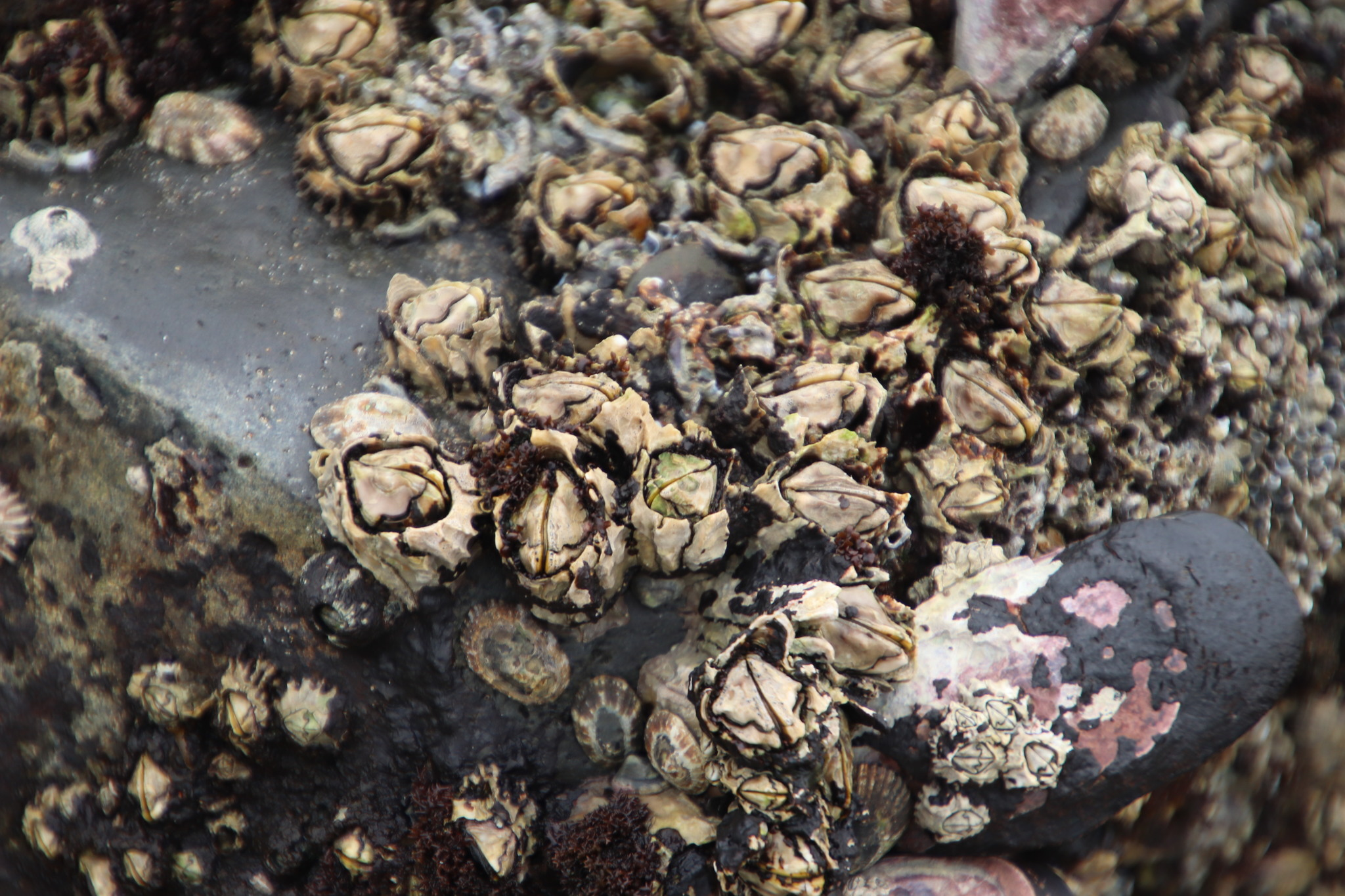
- Octomeris angulosa, eightshell barnacle, South Africa

Scientific classification
- Kingdom: Animalia
- Phylum: Arthropoda
- Class: Thecostraca
- Subclass: Cirripedia
- Order: Balanomorpha
- Family: Chthamalidae
- Genus: Octomeris; Sowerby, 1825

= Octomeris =

Genus of crustaceans

Octomeris is a genus of star barnacles in the family Chthamalidae. There are at least three described species in Octomeris.

== Species ==
These species belong to the genus Octomeris:

- Octomeris angulosa (Sowerby, 1825) (eightshell barnacle)
- Octomeris brunnea Darwin, 1854
- Octomeris intermedia Nilsson-Cantell, 1921
