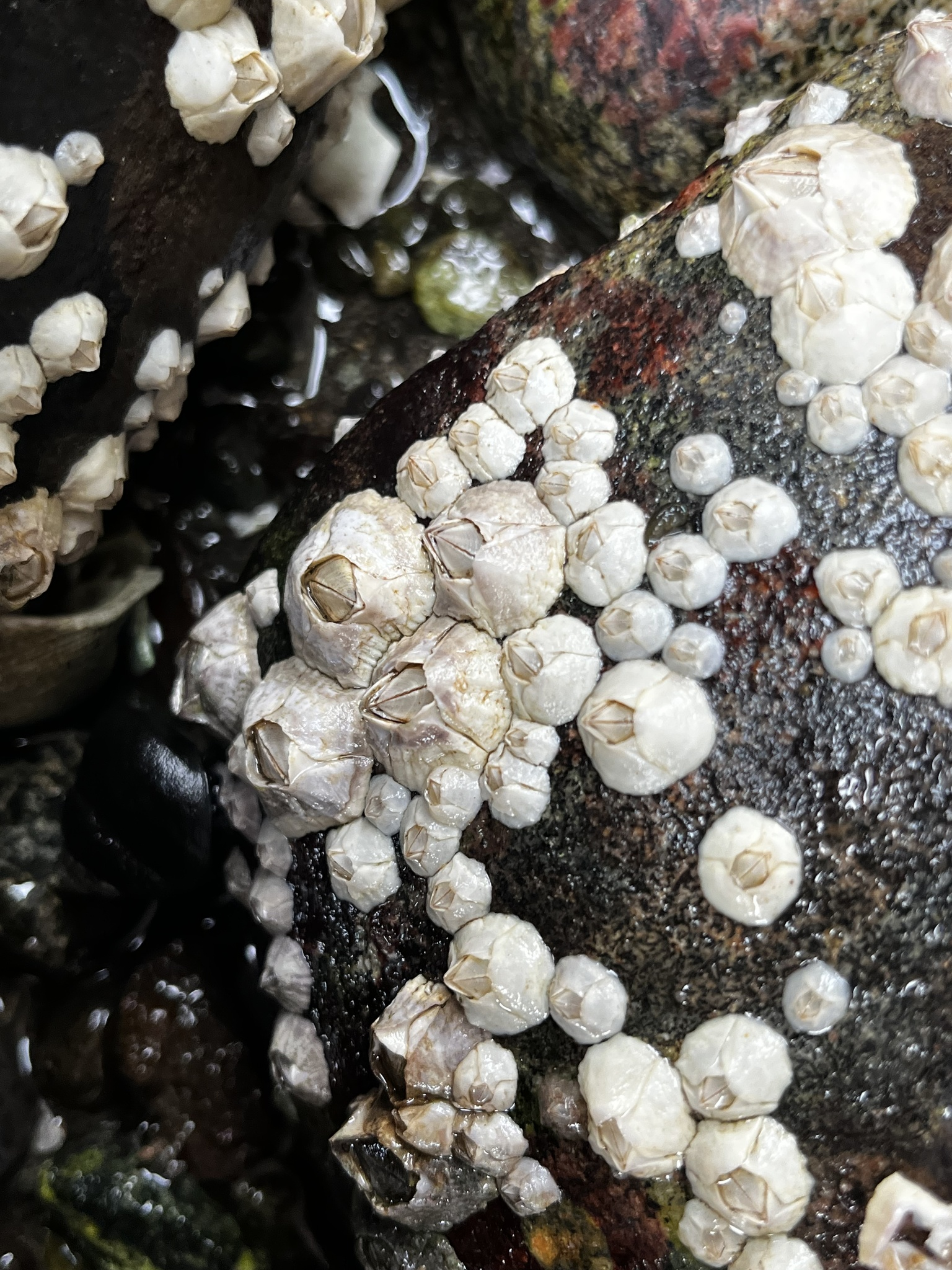
- Elminius kingii

Scientific classification
- Kingdom: Animalia
- Phylum: Arthropoda
- Clade: Pancrustacea
- Class: Thecostraca
- Subclass: Cirripedia
- Order: Balanomorpha
- Family: Elminiidae
- Genus: Elminius; Leach, 1825

= Elminius =

Genus of barnacles

Elminius is a genus of barnacles in the family Elminiidae, containing these species:

- Elminius kingii Gray, 1831
- Elminius cristallinus Gruvel, 1907

Several species previously placed in the genus Elminius have been transferred to Austrominius, Epopella, Matellonius, and Protelminius.
