= Rehderella =

Scientific classification
- Domain: Eukaryota
- Kingdom: Animalia
- Phylum: Arthropoda
- Class: Thecostraca
- Subclass: Cirripedia
- Order: Balanomorpha
- Family: Chthamalidae
- Genus: Rehderella; Foster & Newman, 1987
- Species: R. belyaevi

Binomial name
- Rehderella belyaevi (Zevina & Kurshakova, 1973)

Genus of barnacles

Rehderella is an unusual and monotypic barnacle genus restricted to Easter Island and Pitcairn Island. Rehderella belyaevi is its only species.

Two other barnacle species are found in the intertidal zone of these islands. Euraphia devaneyi is much larger, and possesses calcareous basis. Tesseropora sp. has four shell plates with a single row of pores in shell wall. Both Euraphia and Rehderella have six shell wall plates. Rehderella differs from both in its membraneous basis and fusion of opercular plates on each side.

Nesochthamalus intertextus is the only other Pacific Ocean barnacle with fused opercular plates. Nesochthamalus possesses a partially calcareous saucer-shaped basis, and fused opercular plates which show no visible trace of former articulation. Rehderella shows a line at the former articulation.

== Diagnosis and discussion ==
Shell wall of six plates with membraneous basis, and no basal infolding of shell wall. Sutures between wall plates are straight, and do not fuse at any time during its life cycle. The animal is small, about 5 mm length, and flattened, with a pinkish-yellow color.

Opercular plates of Rehderella are distinctive in the scutum and tergum of each side fusing in young stages. A slight step in basal margin marks the former articulation between plates. Scutal adductor scar is deep and narrow, depressor pit indistinct. Tergal depressor crests 6-8, distinct, depending from basal margin.

Soft part distinctions include card setae on cirri develop only after animal reaches a size of 5 mm. Caudal appendages are present, growing longer with age, up to 20 segments in large specimens.

=== Synonymy and nomenclature ===
==== Rehderella ====
- Rehderella Foster & Newman, 1987: 327; (original description): Poltarukha, 2006: 85; (discussion).
- Type species: Chthamalus belyaevi Zevina & Kurshakova, 1973: 187 by original designation.

==== Rehderella belyaevi ====
- Chthamalus belyaevi Zevina & Kurshakova, 1973: 187; (original description): Newman & Ross, 1976: 41; (summary of references).
- Rehderella belyaevi (Zevina & Kurshakova). Foster & Newman, 1987: 327; (generic reassignment): Poltarukha, 1996: 993; (discussion: 2006: 85; (supplementary description, discussion).
- Type locality: Easter Island.
- Types and Repository: Zoological Museum, Moscow State University: Foster & Newman's topotypes; USNM 233268, 233269; British Museum (Natural History) Reg. No. 1987-3.

== Habitat and geographical range ==
This species is found only on Pitcairn Island and Easter Island in the uppermost intertidal and surf zone, where it forms dense colonies. Whelk predation sets lower environmental limits. During times of calm seas, colonies can be exposed to air and sun for extended periods. In this upper zone, dominance is shared by the gastropod Nodolittorina pyramidalis pascua, an algal grazer. Near the base of the barnacle zone, another grazer, Nerita morio becomes more common, along with other fauna.
