= Catolasmus =

Scientific classification
- Domain: Eukaryota
- Kingdom: Animalia
- Phylum: Arthropoda
- Class: Thecostraca
- Subclass: Cirripedia
- Order: Balanomorpha
- Family: Catophragmidae
- Genus: Catolasmus; Ross & Newman, 2001
- Species: C. pilsbryi

Binomial name
- Catolasmus pilsbryi Broch, 1922

Synonyms
- Catophragmus pilsbryi Broch, 1922

Genus of barnacles

Catolasmus is one of two monotypic Catophragmid acorn barnacle genera recognized in the Northern Hemisphere. It is easily identified by its prominent whorls of imbricating plates surrounding the main wall plates. It is quite large, attaining 55 mm diameter. Catolasmus represents one of the relictual lineages of the basal balanomorph radiation.

== Diagnosis and discussion ==
The most obvious diagnostic feature in the field for Catolasmus is the accessory imbricating plates, which are numerous (up to ten whorls, and prominent, nearly covering the primary wall plates. Individual whorl plates are strongly symmetrically ribbed. There are eight primary wall plates, with the rostrolatus entering the sheath, and free from the adjacent rostrum. Wall plates are solid, with no internal ribbing, as in Balanus. The basis is calcareous, thin, and does not form interdigitations with the wall plates.

Soft parts are not specifically diagnostic, except the labrum has no denticles or bristles.

== Nomenclature ==
- Type species: Catophragmus pilsbryi Broch, 1922
  - Fixation: Original designation by Ross and Newman, 2001
- Type locality: Isla Taboga, Panama, 8°47′N 79°33′W
- Holotype:

== Habitat and geography ==
Catolasmus pilsbryi is a lower littoral species found on the Pacific Coast of Panama and Costa Rica. Ross & Newman, 2001, further stated a preference for vertical surfaces in the lower intertidal and subtidal habitats. Colonies are clumped or occur in patches, somewhat separated.
