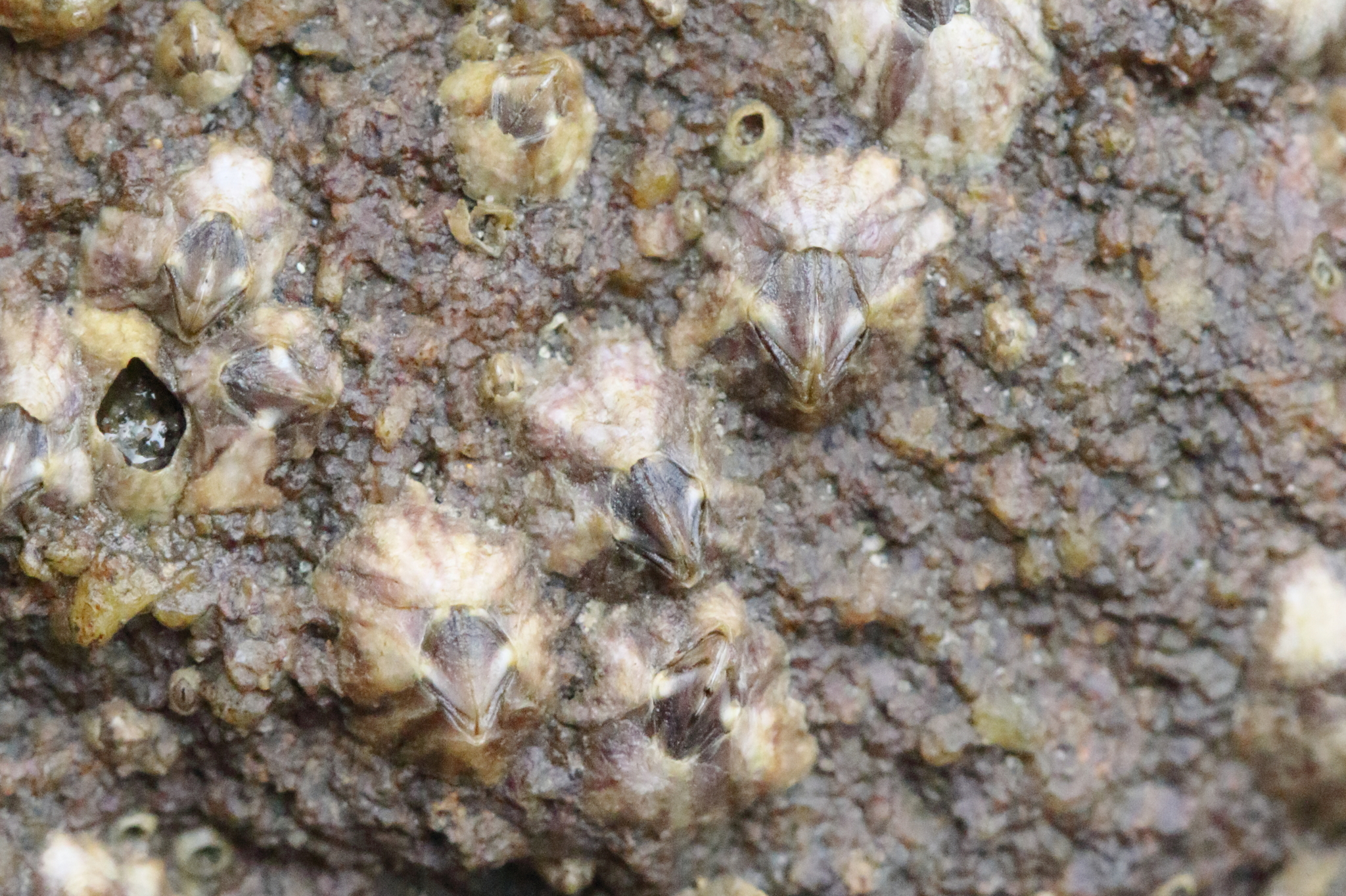
- Hexaminius foliorum

Scientific classification
- Kingdom: Animalia
- Phylum: Arthropoda
- Class: Thecostraca
- Subclass: Cirripedia
- Order: Balanomorpha
- Superfamily: Elminioidea; Chan et al., 2021
- Family: Elminiidae; Foster, 1982

Synonyms
- Elminiinae Foster, 1982

= Elminiidae =

Subfamily of barnacles

Elminiidae is a family of symmetrical, sessile barnacles in the order Balanomorpha. The family includes approximately 5 genera and 12 described species.

== Genera ==
These genera belong to the family Elminiidae:

- Austrominius Buckeridge, 1983
- Elminius Leach, 1825
- Hexaminius Foster, 1982
- Protelminius Buckeridge & Newman, 2010
- † Matellonius Buckeridge, 1983
