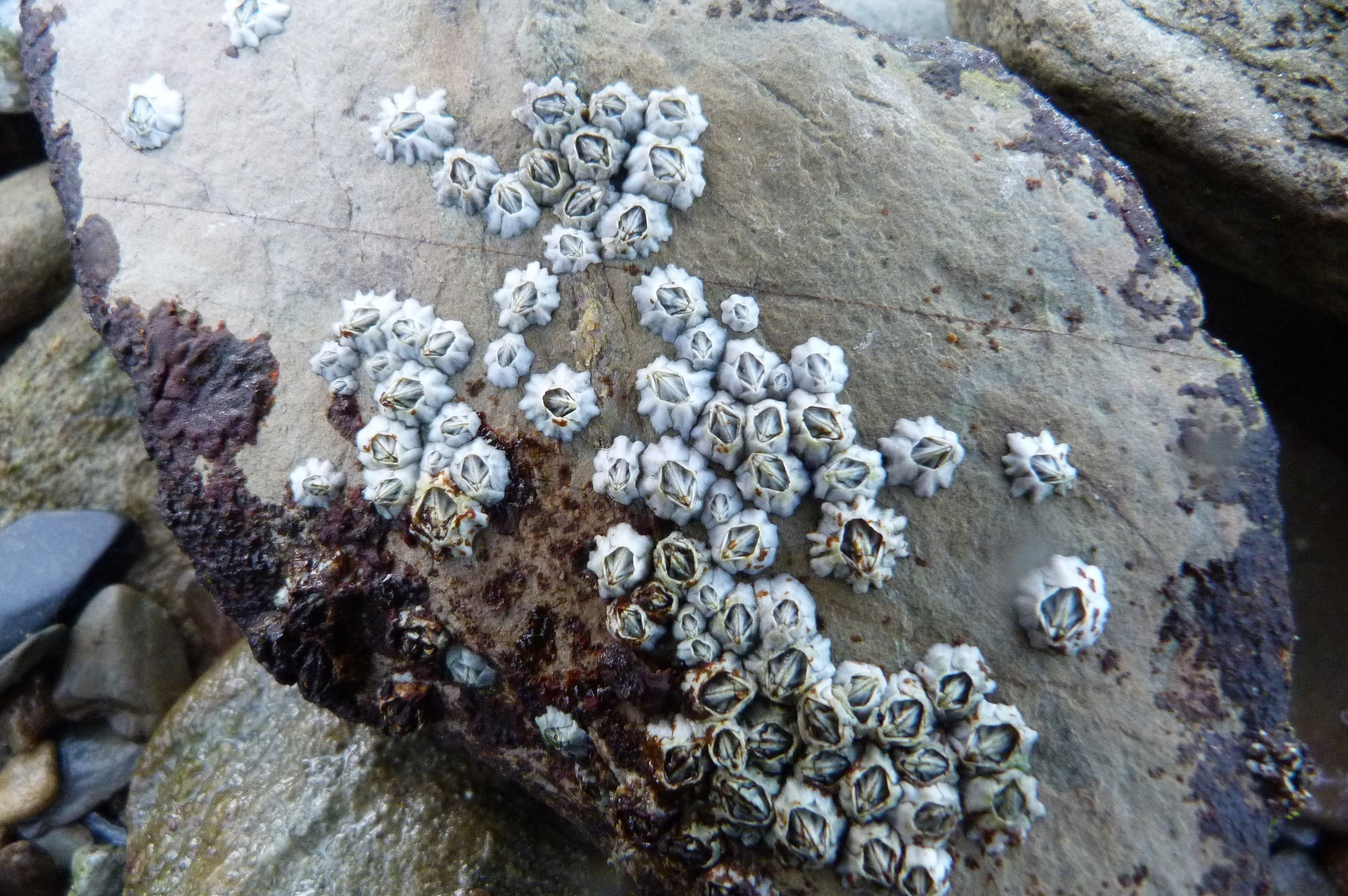
- Austrominius modestus

Scientific classification
- Kingdom: Animalia
- Phylum: Arthropoda
- Class: Thecostraca
- Subclass: Cirripedia
- Order: Balanomorpha
- Family: Elminiidae
- Subfamily: Elminiinae
- Genus: Austrominius; Buckeridge, 1983

Species
- Austrominius adelaidae (Bayliss, 1988); Austrominius covertus (Foster, 1982); Austrominius erubescens (Bayliss, 1994); Austrominius flindersi (Bayliss, 1991); Austrominius modestus (Darwin, 1854); Austrominius placidus (Bayliss, 1994)

= Austrominius =

Genus of crustaceans

Austrominius is a genus of barnacles belonging to the family Elminiidae.

The species of this genus are found in Europe and Australia.
