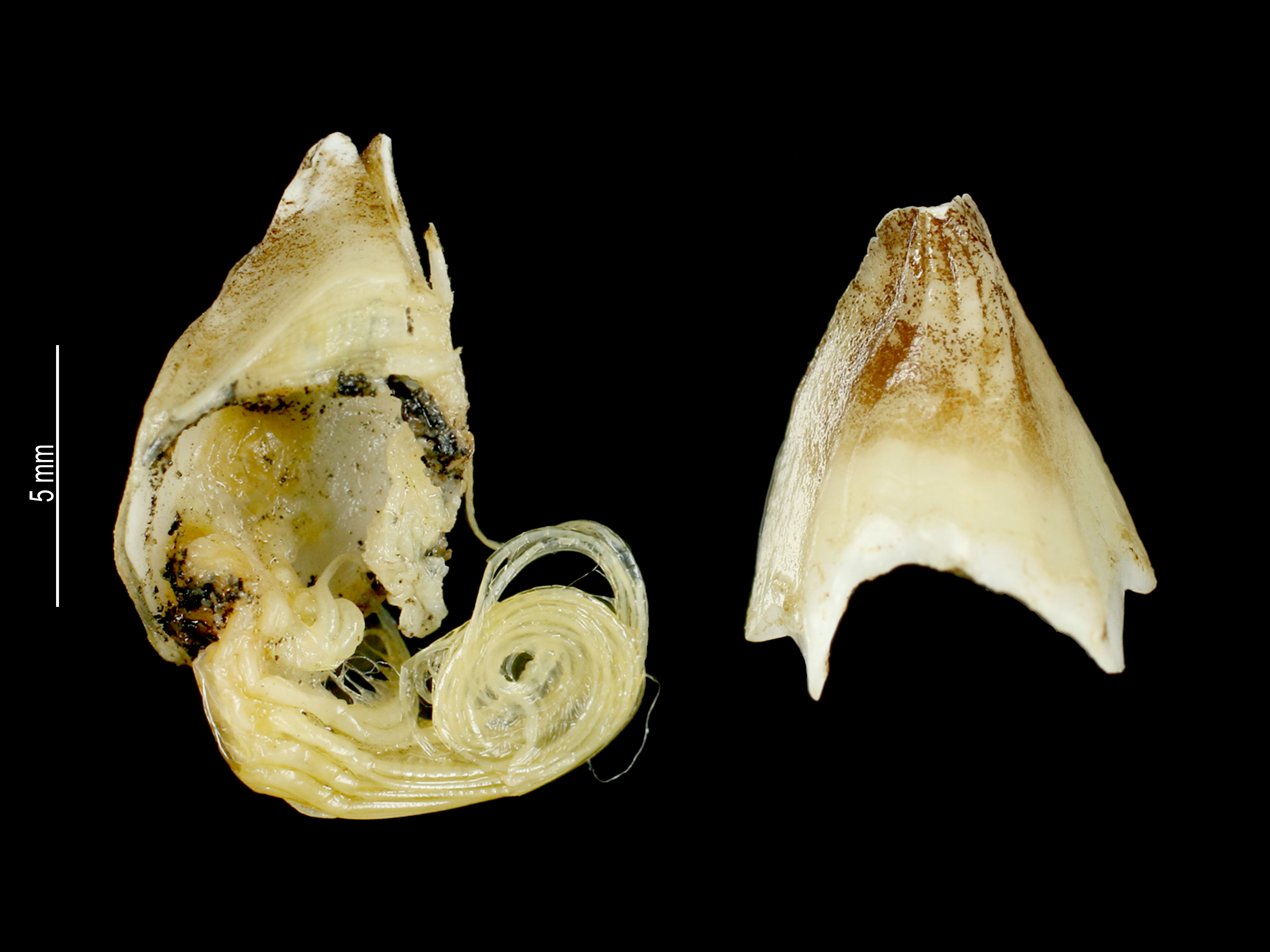
- Eochionelasmus ohtai, Japan

Scientific classification
- Kingdom: Animalia
- Phylum: Arthropoda
- Clade: Pancrustacea
- Class: Thecostraca
- Subclass: Cirripedia
- Order: Balanomorpha
- Superfamily: Chthamaloidea
- Family: Chionelasmatidae; Buckeridge, 1983

= Chionelasmatidae =

Family of crustaceans

Chionelasmatidae is a family of barnacles belonging to the order Balanomorpha.

== Genera ==
- Chionelasmus Pilsbry, 1911
- Eochionelasmus Yamaguchi, 1990
