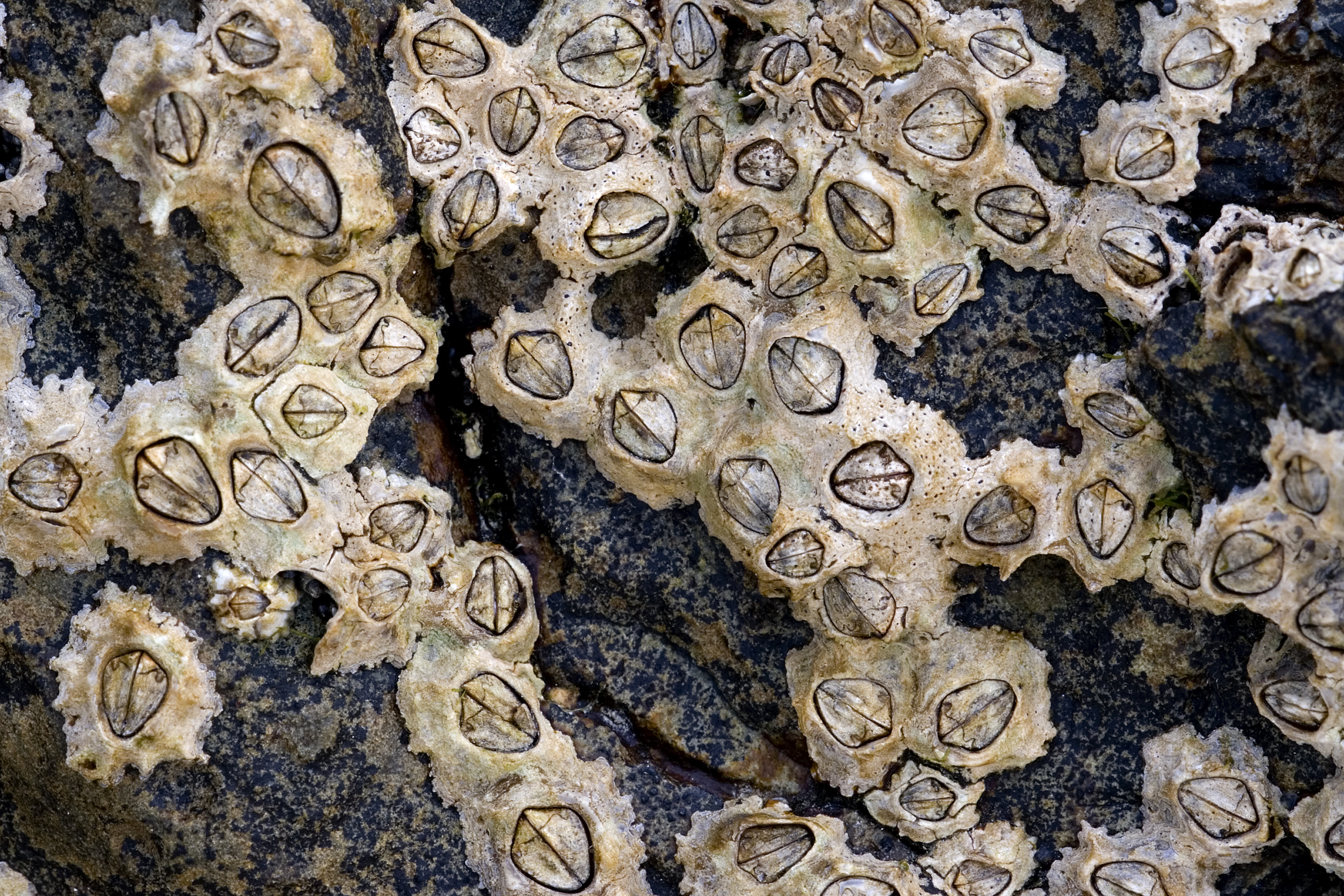
- Chthamalus stellatus

Scientific classification
- Kingdom: Animalia
- Phylum: Arthropoda
- Clade: Pancrustacea
- Class: Thecostraca
- Subclass: Cirripedia
- Order: Balanomorpha
- Superfamily: Chthamaloidea
- Family: Chthamalidae; Darwin, 1854460

= Chthamalidae =

Chthamalidae Temporal range: Oligocene–recent

Family of crustaceans

The Chthamalidae are a family of chthamaloid barnacles, living entirely in intertidal/subtidal habitats, characterized by a primary shell wall of eight, six, or four plates, lacking imbricating plate whorls, and either membraneous or more rarely calcareous basis. They are not found below immediate subtidal habitats, and more likely are found in the highest tier of shallow-water barnacle fauna. They can be found in the most rigorous wave-washed locations, and some species are found in the surf zone above high tide mark, only receiving water from wave action at high tide. The family includes at least 56 recognized species.

== Definition and discussion ==
The shell wall consists of eight wall plates, which reduce to six, and four in some species. Plate reduction is accomplished by fusion of rostrolatera with adjacent laterals, or initially by suppression of carinolatus II, reducing plate number from eight to six. Unlike the superfamilies Coronuloidea and Balanoidea, the rostrum rarely fuses with rostrolatus. In soft parts, caudal appendages are rare, and the mandible usually has three or four teeth, rarely five, and frequently bears fine bristles. Cirri I and II, sometimes III, bear specialized setae to comb net-forming cirri for food particles. These are termed comb setae, which are thin spines bearing fine bristles, and card setae (also known as grapple setae). Card setae are grapple-like or wool carder-like in appearance.

The other chthamaloid family, Catophragmidae, differs from Chthamalidae in possessing whorls of imbricating basal plates. In field work, this is the easiest characteristic to observe.

Taxonomic classification of chthamalid barnacles has proven challenging because of the preferred environment, resulting in convergence of shell and opercular form. Characters used in classification are weighted heavily to soft part morphology. As this requires time and specialized equipment, effort is made in this project to aid identification for field and biodiversity surveyors. Usually, any given region harbors less than three chthamalid species, which will usually concentrate to preferred microhabitats. Becoming familiar with what should be expected in each area narrows the range of species dramatically. Then, unusual finds can be spotted and sampled for further lab study.

DNA sequence data and allozyme analyses have proved promising in uncovering cryptic species populations. Excellent examples of species that have been separated initially or only using molecular data include the sister species Chthamalus fragilis and Chthamalus proteus, as well as a number of cryptic and sympatric species along the Tropical Eastern Pacific coast of Mexico.

== Subdivisions of Chthamalidae ==
=== Subfamilies ===
In the reorganization of this family published by Chan et al. (2021), the three subfamilies were not retained and genera below are now assigned directly to the family.

=== Overview of genera (14) ===
This is a list of recognized genera in the family Chthamalidae, according to the classification in Chan et al. (2021) and the World Register of Marine Species.

- Octomeris Sowerby, 1825
- Euraphia Conrad, 1837
- Nesochthamalus Foster & Newman, 1987
- Notochthamalus Foster & Newman, 1987
- Rehderella Foster & Newman, 1987
- Chamaesipho Darwin, 1854
- Chthamalus Ranzani, 1817; Type Genus
- Jehlius Ross, 1971
- Tetrachthamalus Newman, 1967
- Chinochthamalus Foster, 1980
- Pseudoctomeris Poltarukha, 1996
- Hexechamaesipho Poltarukha, 1996
- Microeuraphia Poltarukha, 1997
- Pseudoeuraphia Poltarukha, 2000a
- Caudoeuraphia Poltarukha, 1997

== Geographic and environmental overview ==
Members of the Chthamalidae are found in all oceans except the Arctic Ocean, in temperate and tropical zones. They prefer intertidal marine habitats, from lower littoral to upper surf zone, uncommonly sublittoral. All are known from normal marine salinity. Several genera are monotypic. Some of these appear to be relictual, others are speciations on oceanic islands.
