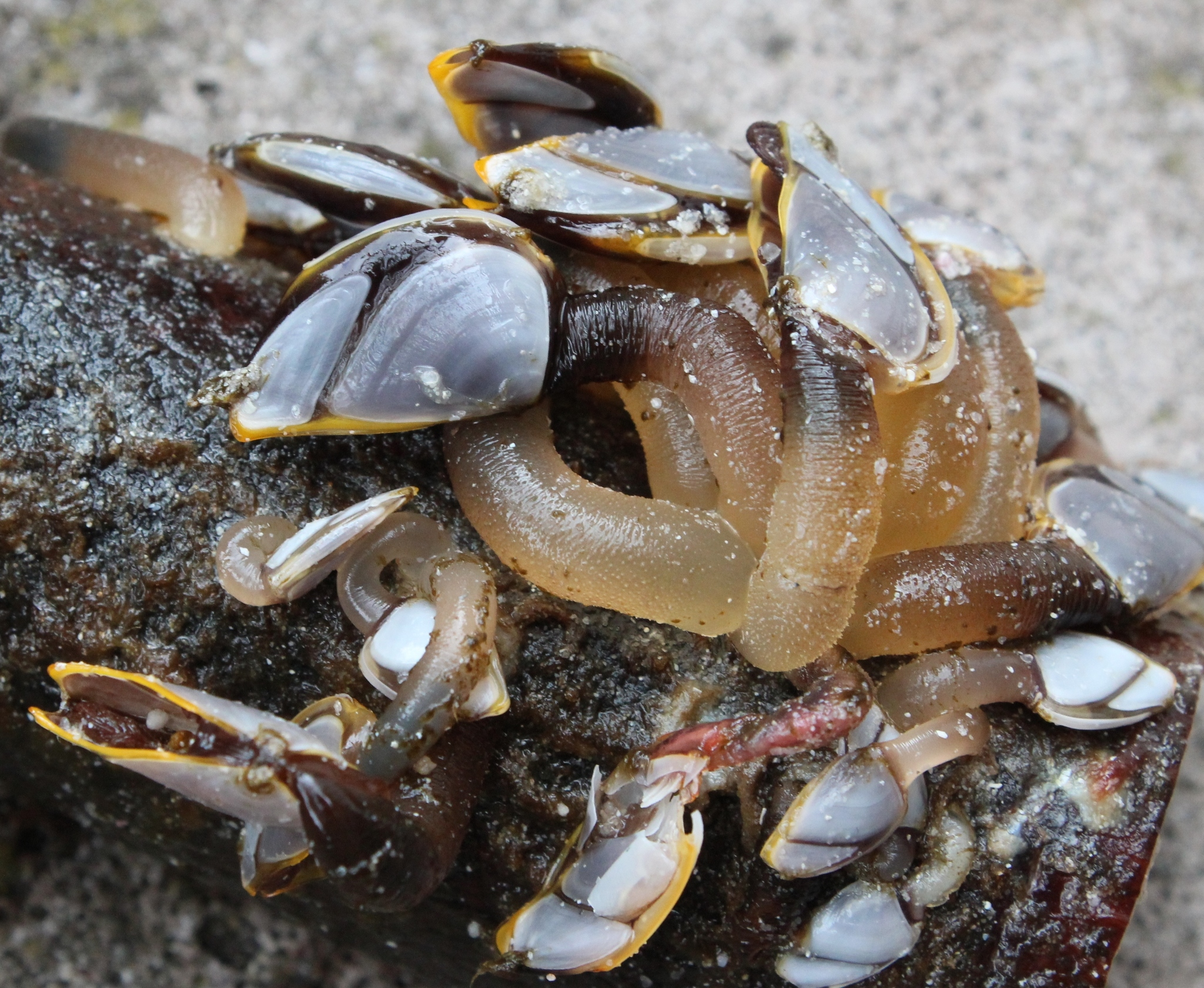
- Lepas testudinata, South Africa

Scientific classification
- Kingdom: Animalia
- Phylum: Arthropoda
- Clade: Pancrustacea
- Class: Thecostraca
- Subclass: Cirripedia
- Order: Scalpellomorpha
- Family: Lepadidae
- Genus: Lepas
- Species: L. testudinata

Binomial name
- Lepas testudinata Aurivillius, 1892

Synonyms
- Lepas elongata (Quoy & Gaimard, 1892); Lepas affinis (Borradaile, 1916)

= Lepas testudinata =

Species of barnacle

Lepas testudinata is a species of goose barnacle in the family Lepadidae. First observed in 1834, Lepas testudinata has undergone several reclassifications, and its relationship to other Lepas species is still the subject of ongoing research. L. testudinata is endemic to temperate waters in the China Seas, Coral Sea, and the Indo-West Pacific, and there are two distinct subgroups within the species. This barnacle species exclusively colonizes free-floating debris and tidewrack, and can form colonies of over 1000 members at a time. Due to this colonization habit, L. testudinata plays a role in biofouling and often serves as a foundation species when preyed upon.

== Taxonomy ==
Lepas testudinata is a species of goose barnacle in the family Lepadidae. The species was likely first observed in 1834 by Jean René Constant Quoy and Joseph Paul Gaimard, and was initially named Lepas elongata. In 1892, Carl Wilhelm Samuel Aurivillius described what he believed to be a separate species as Lepas testudinata, with its official classification as Lepas (Lepas) testudinata. In 1978, Brian Arthur Foster declared Lepas elongata a nomen oblitum since it had not been used since the 1920s. Foster concluded that Lepas elongata is synonymous with Lepas testudinata due to their similar geographical distribution and peduncle structure. In this same paper, Foster also declared Lepas affinis (named by Lancelot Alexander Borradaile, 1916) a synonym.

== Description ==
Lepas testudinata is a planktonic filter feeding barnacle. Their shell is made of two bivalved pieces that are both made up of five symmetrical calcite plates laid on top of one another; this five-plate structure is found in all Lepas species. L. testudinata has a defined abdominal segment and its adductor muscles are situated in front of the head shield. Adults can grow up to 5 centimetres (2.0 in). In 2015, Philipp H. Schiffer and Hans-Georg Herbig hypothesized that the number of plates increased as the species evolved, but a 2012 study by Marcos Pérez-Losada and colleagues argued that the modern day 5-plate structure is a result of secondary loss, or the evolutionary reversion to an ancestral physiology. They concluded that evolutionary pressures are not driving the species to have thicker shells.

Located antero-laterally from the head shield, L. testudinata employs a frontal horn, a sensory organ made up of glandular tissue. Additionally, the species employs a photoreceptive naupliar eye within the mantle cavity. Lepas testudinata has a single, muscular peduncle (also referred to as a stem or a stalk) that can extend from the shell and affix it to an object; the phenotype of this stalk is largely dependent on the object L. testudinata has affixed itself to. When affixed to kelp, the peduncle is smooth and can be up to 25 centimetres (9.8 in) in length. This compares to non-kelp forms that have a short and spiny peduncle. It is still unclear if these two phenotypes represent two distinct lineages within the species or indicate a yet to be understood morphological adaptation.

=== Life cycle ===
Lepas testudinata is hermaphroditic, and the species does not demonstrate sexual dimorphism. L. testudinata reproduces via broadcast spawning, meaning that the eggs are fertilized in the barnacle's mantle cavity. The eggs hatch into nauplii larvae and then pass through six naupliar stages. Following this, they enter a non-feeding cyprid larval stage, known as the settling stage. From there, they metamorphose into their final, adult stage. Similar to other Cirripedia species, L. testudinata employs a set of compound eyes prior to metamorphosis, where they are partially lost and continue to function in a reduced state throughout maturation.

== Ecology and colonization ==
Similar to other species of barnacles, Lepas testudinata forms colonies along tidewrack, driftwood, and man-made items. They do not affix themselves to stationary objects, instead they exclusively prefer mobile, floating objects. This preference has allowed the species to become widespread across temperate oceans in the Southern Hemisphere. L. testudinata, in particular, shows a preference to colonize on the kelp species Ecklonia maxima. The species can regularly form colonies greater than 1000 members and has a tendency to colonize plastic pollution when available. Their colonization of man-made objects is the main factor in the species' dispersal throughout the South African region. Off the coast of New Zealand, the sea slug Fiona pinnata predates Lepas species barnacles, and L. testudinata is often found colonizing the kelp species Durvillaea antarctica.

Along with other species of Lepas barnacles, Lepas testudinata poses a major risk to biofouling damage, as colonies can form on man-made structures and damage them. L. testudinata also functions as a foundation species when their colonies wash ashore, where they are then consumed by scavengers. A 2021 study by Thomas Mesaglio and colleagues found that the presence of washed-up L. testudinata colonies on beaches result in ecological succession that significantly increases the species diversity of the local environment.

== Distribution and evolution ==
L. testudinata is broadly distributed throughout the Southern hemisphere and its range extends into parts of the Northern hemisphere, though it is strictly limited to pelagic, temperate waters. More specifically, it is distributed throughout the China Seas, Coral Sea, and the Indo-West Pacific. The species was not observed in China's seas until the 1990s, and ongoing research seeks to determine if it was accidentally introduced to this region or not. Despite this wide range, L. testudinata is generally considered a rarely observed species. The species has not been evaluated by the IUCN.

Mitochondrial data of L. testudinata shows that there are two subgroups within the species, one in South African waters, and one in Australian waters. While the exact relationship between these subgroups is unknown, Schiffer and Herbig proposed that the genetic deviation of these two groups is caused by L. testudinata's native range being noncontinuous. The species cannot survive in Antarctic waters and the Antarctic current system thus forms a barrier between the South African and Australian subgroups.

Analyses of the 18S gene places L. testudinata within an ingroup to L. anatifera but analysis of the 28S sequence places it within an ingroup to L. australis. Due to the broad similarities in morphology between these three species, their overall phylogeny is considered to be very closely related and is the subject of continued research. The following cladogram shows the phylogenetic position of L. testudinata among select members of the genus Lepas, based upon comparison of the 18S gene:

- Lepas
  - other species
  - - - - L. anserifera
      - - - Lepas testudinata
          - L. anatifera
        - L. australis
