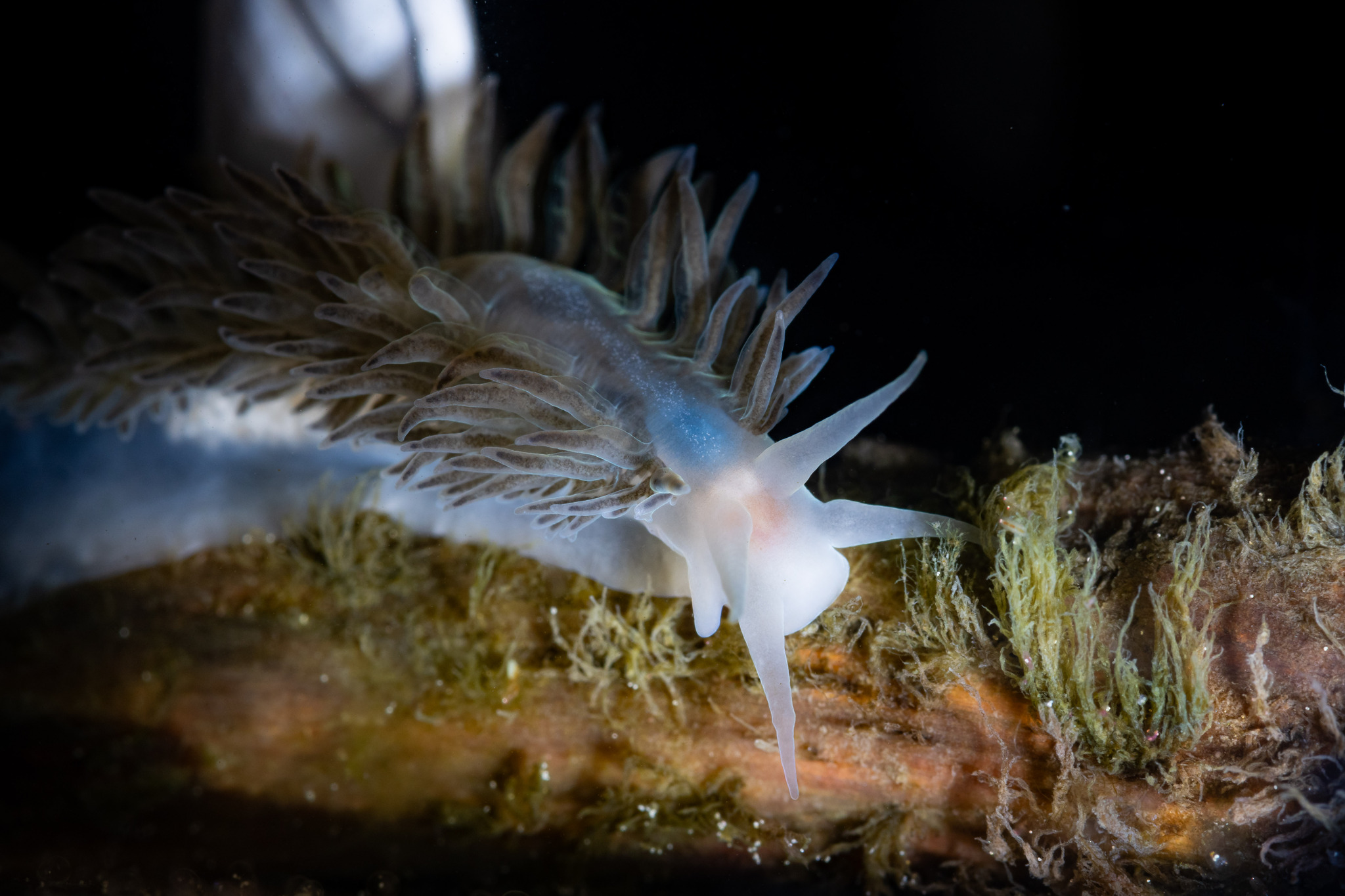
- Fiona pinnata

Scientific classification
- Kingdom: Animalia
- Phylum: Mollusca
- Class: Gastropoda
- Order: Nudibranchia
- Suborder: Aeolidacea
- Family: Fionidae
- Genus: Fiona
- Species: F. pinnata

Binomial name
- Fiona pinnata (Eschscholtz, 1831)

Synonyms
- Limax marinus Förskal, 1775; Eolidia pinnata Eschscholtz, 1831; Eolidia longicauda Quoy & Gaimard, 1832; Oithona nobilis Alder & Hancock, 1851; Fiona nobilis Alder & Hancock, 1855; Fiona atlantica Bergh, 1857; Hymeneaeolis elegantissima A. Costa, 1867; Aeolis plicata Hutton, 1881; Fiona marina var. pacifica Bergh, 1894; Fiona marina Suter, 1913; Fiona pinnata Iredale & O'Donoghue, 1923

= Fiona pinnata =

Species of gastropod

Fiona pinnata, common name Fiona, is a species of small pelagic nudibranch (sea slug), a marine gastropod mollusk in the superfamily Fionoidea. This nudibranch species lives worldwide on floating objects on seas, and feeds mainly on barnacles, specifically goose barnacles in the genus Lepas.

The anatomy of this species is very unusual. It is currently the only named member of the genus Fiona but a 2016 study showed that this species is a species complex. The family Fionidae was expanded in 2016 to include Tergipedidae, Eubranchidae and Calmidae as a result of a molecular phylogenetics study. Features that are characteristic of the genus Fiona include the similar-looking oral tentacles and rhinophores; the cerata with a membrane and lacking a cnidosac; a dorsal anal opening; a reproductive system with two genital openings; two jaws with a cutting-edge, and a radula with only one central denticle in each row of teeth. That one denticle has a central cusp and a few surrounding cusps.

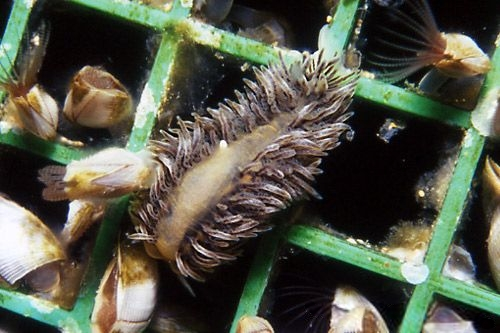
Fiona pinnata

== Distribution ==
Fiona pinnata is found in all seas worldwide, on many different kinds of floating objects.

The type locality is the island location of Sitka, Alaska (Baranof Island), on the extreme northwestern coast of North America.

== Taxonomy ==
A 2016 study showed that this species is a species complex, but did not name the segregate species.

Various names have been created for this species. Limax by Peter Forsskål from 1775 was preoccupied by Johan Ernst Gunnerus in 1770. Alder and Hancock's 1851 name Oithona was preoccupied by a Cyclopoid genus from W. Baird in 1843, so in 1855 they chose instead Fiona from a character in Ossian. Harold John Finlay proposed a new genus Dolicheolis for one of those synonyms Eolidia longicauda in 1927.

== Description ==
The body is elongated and oblong-elliptical. The length of the body is usually about 20 mm, but the largest reported size of the body is 50 mm. Dimensions of a specimen with a total length of 31.7 mm are as follows: 17.7 mm is the body to the tip of cerata, the length of the foot is 14.4 mm, the tail at the end of the foot is 14 mm. The colour of the head and body ranges from white to brown or purple depending on its food. The foot is long and lanceolate, rounded in front and produced into a fine point behind. The margin of the foot is thin, fringed and crumpled, except near the head, where it is simple. It is divided in front, but not produced into propodial tentacles.

The cerata are numerous, elongated, with a membranous fringe on the inner sides. Cerata may seem to be without apparent order but they are set in oblique rows containing from four to six cerata. There are also small cerata near the margins of the body. Cerata on the sides of the back are dark brown, each margined with white. The cerata have no cnidosacs. They are particularly compressed towards the base.

Fiona pinnata has no eyes.

The rhinophores are simple and resemble the oral tentacles. They are distant, subulate, tapering and they project outward. They are not retractile, and are without pockets.

The oral tentacles are shorter, thickened at the base, tapering, projecting laterally and horizontally and curved backward. The mouth is situated on the inferior surface of the head. The mouth is small and the external lip is divided behind on the median line.

The anus is between the cerata on the right side of the body, and its opening is directing dorsally. The genital opening is separate.

Joshua Alder and Albany Hancock (1851) described the tissues of Fiona pinnata as being very tough and firm.

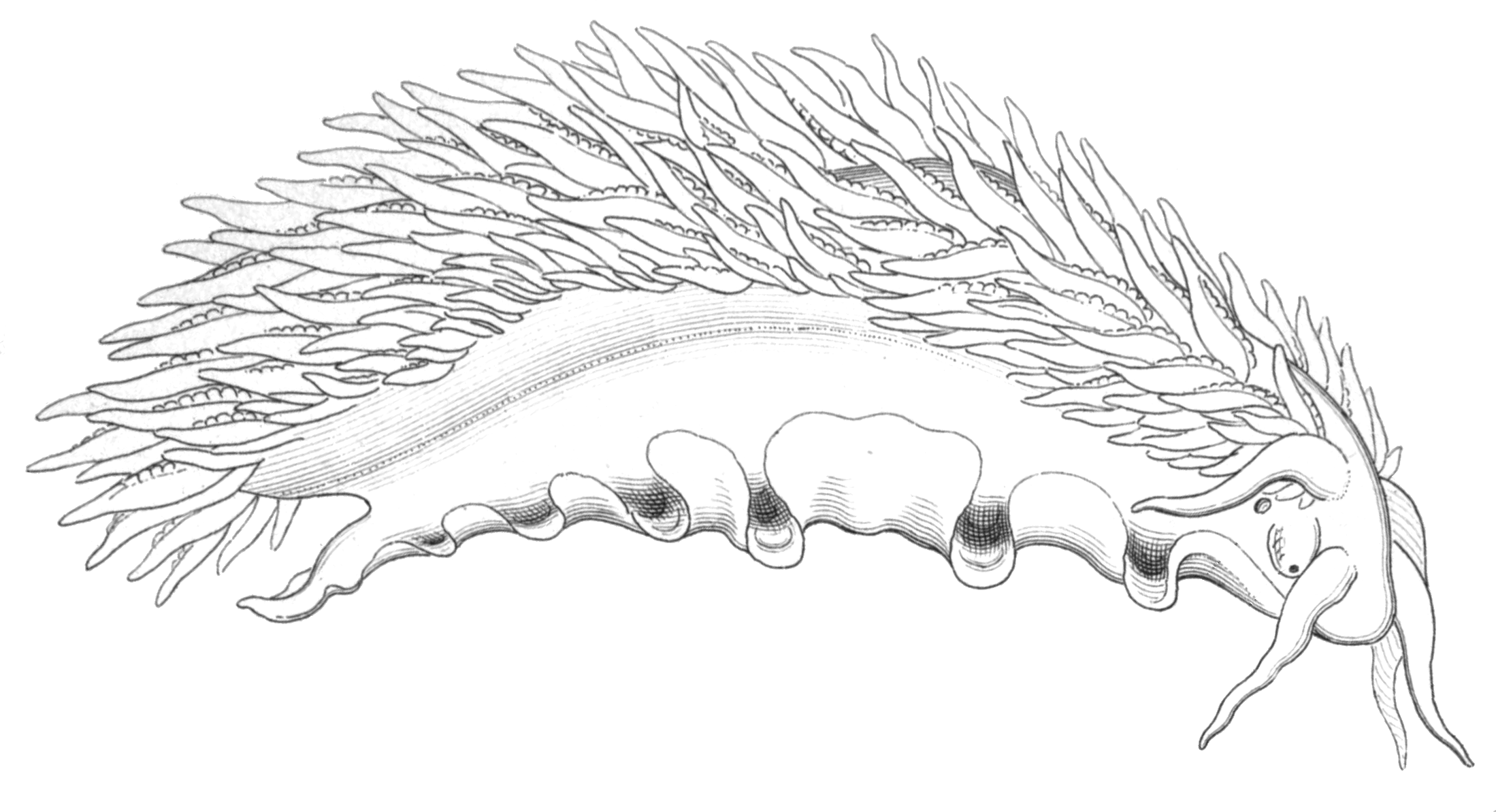
Drawing of Fiona pinnata. The penis is partially extended behind the right tentacle. The genital pore is visible behind the penis.

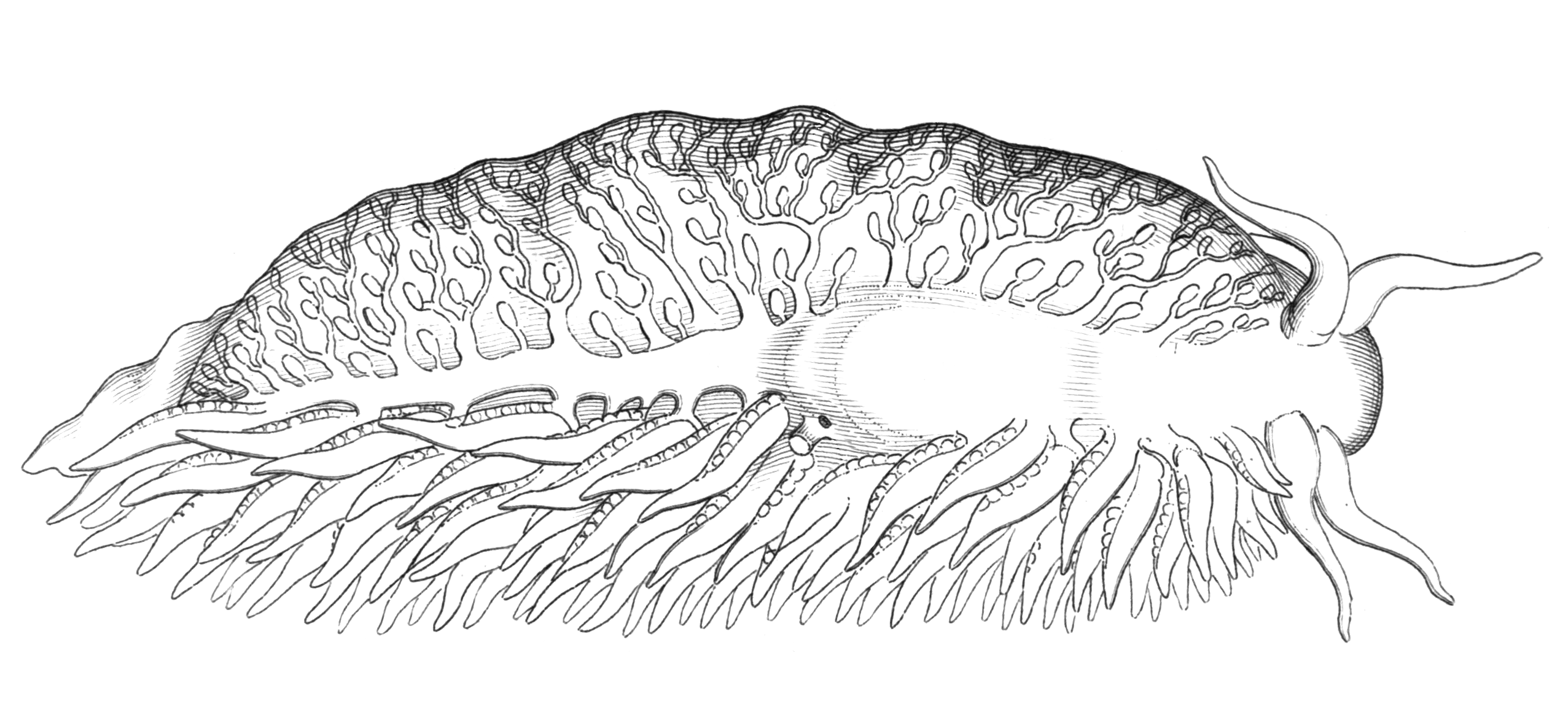
Drawing of dorsal view of Fiona pinnata with cerata removed on the left side. There are visible branches of the digestive gland leading from cerata to the gut. The heart is visible in the centre. The anus is visible as tube-like opening next to the heart. There is also renal pore between heart and anus. (See notes on the image.)

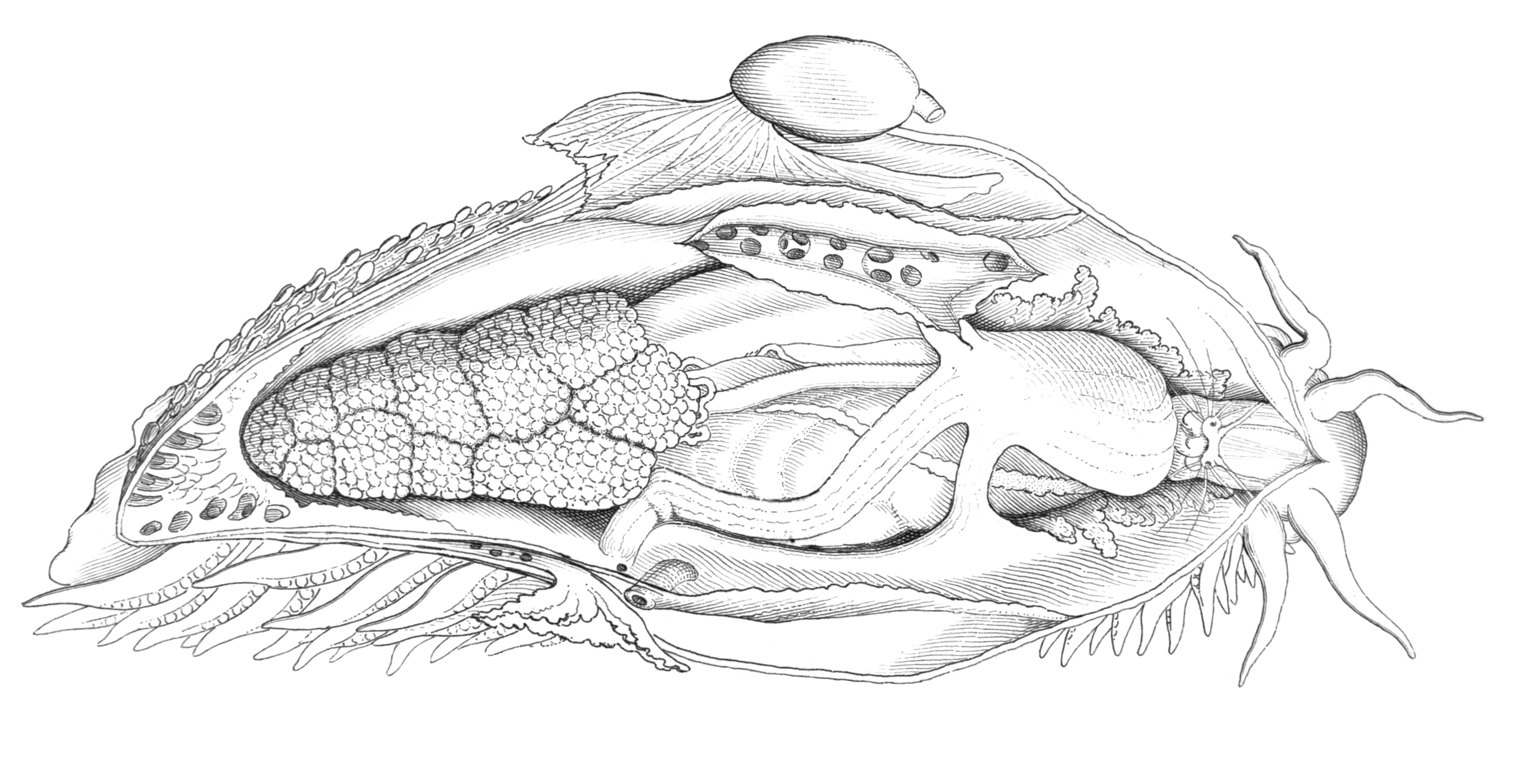
Drawing of dorsal view of internal anatomy of Fiona pinnata. The largest visible organs include (from the right): buccal mass, esophagus and cerebral ganglia around esophagus, stomach, two hepatic ducts leading to the stomach, intestine leading from the stomach and ovotestis (on the left). In the top center is a section through the pericardium and a section though the one of hepatic ducts. (See notes on the image.)

=== Digestive system ===
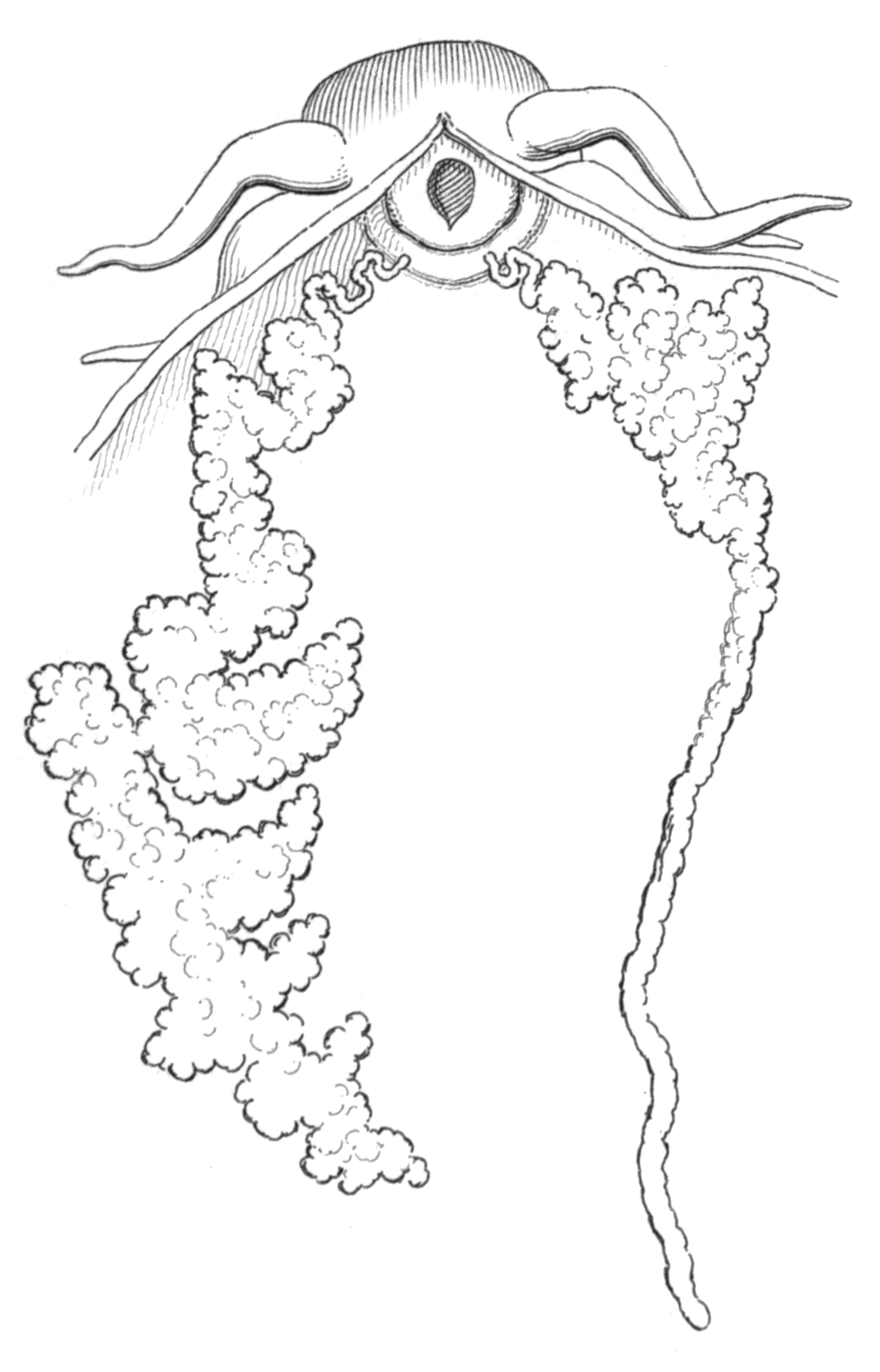
Drawing of mouth and wall around mouth of Fiona pinnata showing salivary glands and salivary ducts. The buccal mass and whole visceral mass is removed.

Digestive system: The channel leading from mouth to the buccal mass is very short and constricted; and, just before it opens into the buccal mass, it receives on either side below, a very slender duct from a large, much folliculated, salivary gland. These glands lie beneath the stomach and extend almost halfway down the body. That on the right side is considerably less than the other, and is somewhat tubular, — distinctly so towards its termination; the one on the left side is much complicated in form, being irregularly and extensively sacculated. The position of these glands is unusual, but there are also other species like Doto fragilis, that open into the channel of the mouth in advance of the buccal mass.

The buccal mass is small, rather long, slender, and irregularly elliptical. There are two corneous plates or jaws at the sides of the buccal mass. It is slightly prolonged behind for the reception of the posterior portion of the radula, and there are muscles are arranged around. Muscles are from dorsal view extensively developed, forming a dense mass, the fibres passing transversely and have their extremities inserted into the dorsal margins of the jaws. These muscles assist in the motion of the jaws. Muscles for moving the whole buccal mass forward are composed of flattened and isolated bands with their extremities attached to the posterior margin of the jaws and to the muscles forming the walls of the channel of the mouth.

Fiona pinnata has two corneous jaws (mandibles), with a denticulate cutting-edge. The posterior portion is flattened. The corneous plates are little short of the size of the buccal mass, and much elongated, well arched and ovate. (When they are entirely isolated, they strongly resemble the shape the valves of a small bivalve of the genus Mytilus). They are smooth, glossy, and of a brownish amber colour, darkest towards the anterior extremity, which gives support to the cutting blade. This is a winglike appendage of no great size, terminating below in a free point, and having the cutting margin arched forward, plain, and nearly at right angles to the general direction of the plate. Above is a small process or fulcrum — the point at which the two plates are articulated. Immediately behind this point there is the dorsal margin of the plates is reflected and expanded into an arched lobe for muscular attachment. The length of the jaw is 2.8 mm. The maximum width and maximum height of the jaw is 1.3 mm.

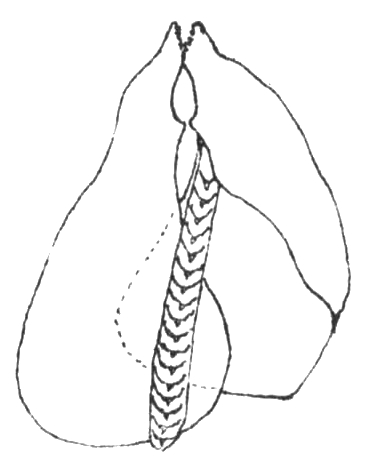
Drawing of the jaws of Fiona pinnata, also showing the radula between them.

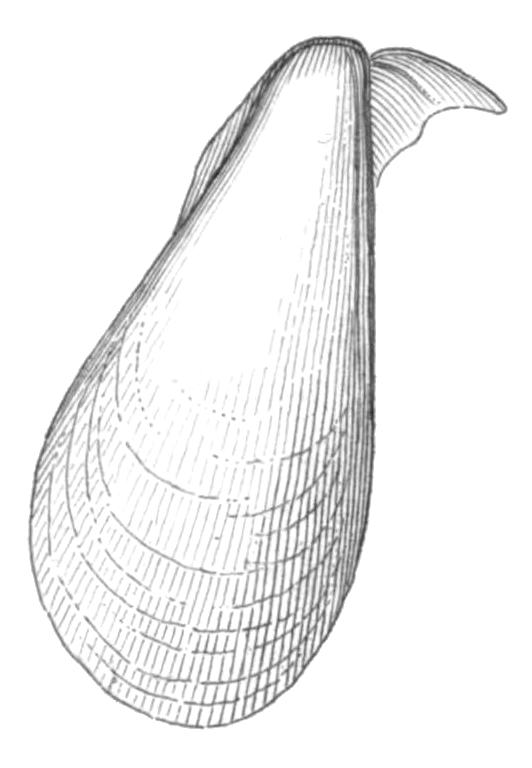
Drawing of external view of the one jaw of Fiona pinnata. Cutting edge is on the top right. Expanded lobe on the dorsal margin for muscular attachment is on the top left.

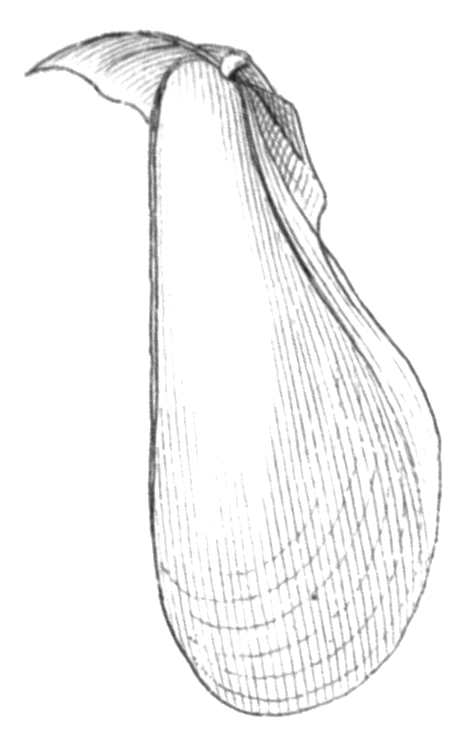
Drawing of internal view of the one jaw of Fiona pinnata. Cutting edge is on the top left. There is visible the point, where the jaws are articulated in the top center. Expanded lobe on the dorsal margin for muscular attachment is on the top right.

The radula is supported on a fleshy ridge that rises up from the floor of the buccal cavity, and extends in the antero-posterior direction from the oesophagus towards the anterior opening. The radula is long, linear, and strap-formed, and is composed of semicircular and crescent-shaped denticles (tiny teeth) of an orange colour. There are 40 rows of teeth in radula: the 15 oldest denticles are in the anterior end, with 22 denticles after the angle and three incomplete denticles in the sheath in the posterior end of the radula. The radula formula is 0+1+0, which means that there is only a single central denticle in each row. There is a pointed spine in the centre, and 6 or 6-7 smaller spines on each side of the denticle. There are also sometimes minute spines at the base of denticle's outer margin. All the spines are a little bent, and have their points directed backwards towards the oesophageal opening. The whole length of the radula is 2.6 mm.

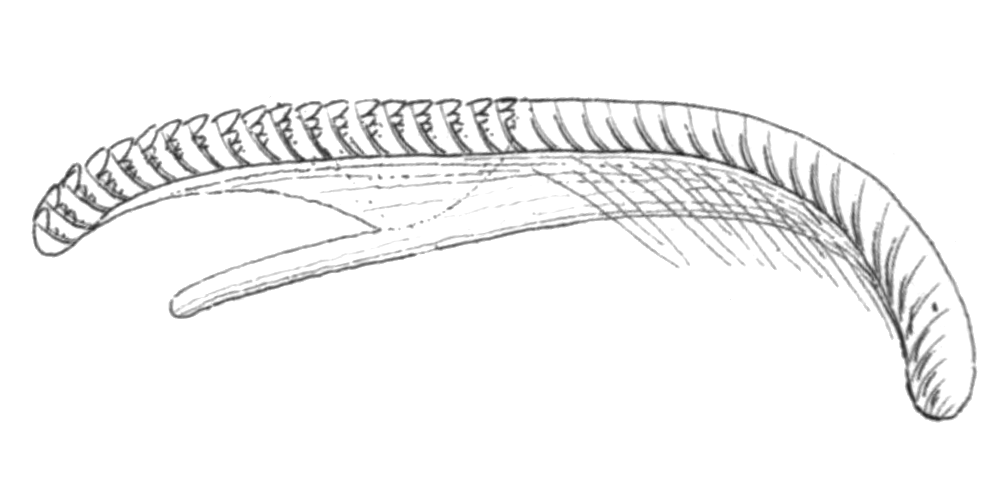
Drawing of lateral view of the radula of Fiona pinnata. Anterior end is on the left.

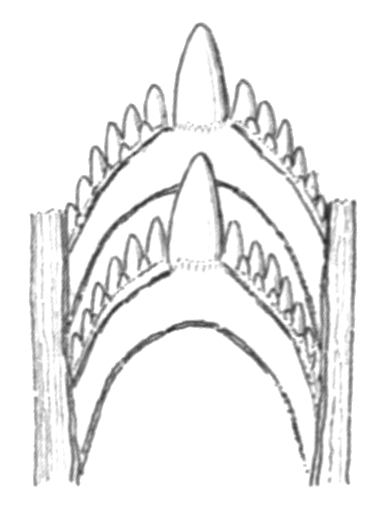
Drawing of two rows from radula of Fiona pinnata. Each row consist of only one denticle, so there are viewed only two denticles.

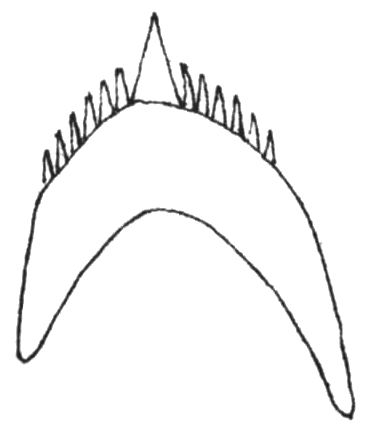
Drawing of a single denticle of Fiona pinnata.

The oesophagus is a short and rather slender tube. It leads from the upper part of the buccal mass towards, and opens into, the anterior margin of a distinct pyriform stomach. The stomach has the broad end forward, is placed above the reproductive system, and lies quite in the anterior portion of the visceral cavity. The internal surface of the stomach is not lamellated. The intestine leads from posterior end of the stomach, and is inclining slightly to the right side and passes backwards to the tubular anus. The anus is placed a little to the right of the median line of the back, immediately behind the heart. The intestinal tube is rather short, of equal diameter throughout, and internally plicated longitudinally.

The hepatic apparatus is very peculiar in this animal. The caudal end of the stomach receives two biliary ducts, one on each side of the intestine. These ducts or hepatic canals are nearly as wide as the intestine, and they are diverging as they leave the stomach, very shortly pass into the skin at the sides of the back, where each opens into a wide channel that extends nearly the whole length of the body. The channels receive numerous branches, which communicate with the glands of the cerata, and as they approach the lateral expansion at the side of the body. These channels are subdivided several times and are irregularly disposed. The anterior portions of the great hepatic channels are connected with two folliculated glandular bodies much and irregularly sacculated. These glands are united to the skin, one on each side near the region of the stomach, and probably form the inner walls of those portions of the channels. Hepatic canals are almost entirely within the skin. The hepatic glands are large, nearly filling the cerata. They are slightly and irregularly sacculated, with the inner surface of the investing membrane lined with a dark granular substance; above, this substance is very abundant, forming a dense mass; below, the membrane in some of the cerata is entirely devoid of it.

The arrangement of the hepatic canals differs from that which prevails in the Eolidida. In Eolis, Embletonia, Doto, Dendronotus, Lomonotus, and Antiopa, the principal canals lie free in the visceral cavity, and in all of them there is a median posterior trunk. In these respects Oithona would appear to resemble Hermaa, in which the whole of the hepatic ramifications are apparently connected with the skin, and there are only two principal trunks, which pass down the sides of the back. It is evident, however, that the digestive system alone sufficiently distinguishes Oithona from all the above genera, not even excepting Hermaa. In the central part of the caudal end of the body, behind the ovary, there is likewise a glandular substance, of a reddish colour, folliculated and apparently branched, in connexion with the branches of the hepatic canals within the skin. These branches at the posterior portion of the body probably form a sort of network of tubes across the dorsal aspect. Such perhaps may be inferred from the appearance the branches present when the skin of the back is divided down the median line. See also MacFarland (1966, page 357).

=== Reproductive system ===
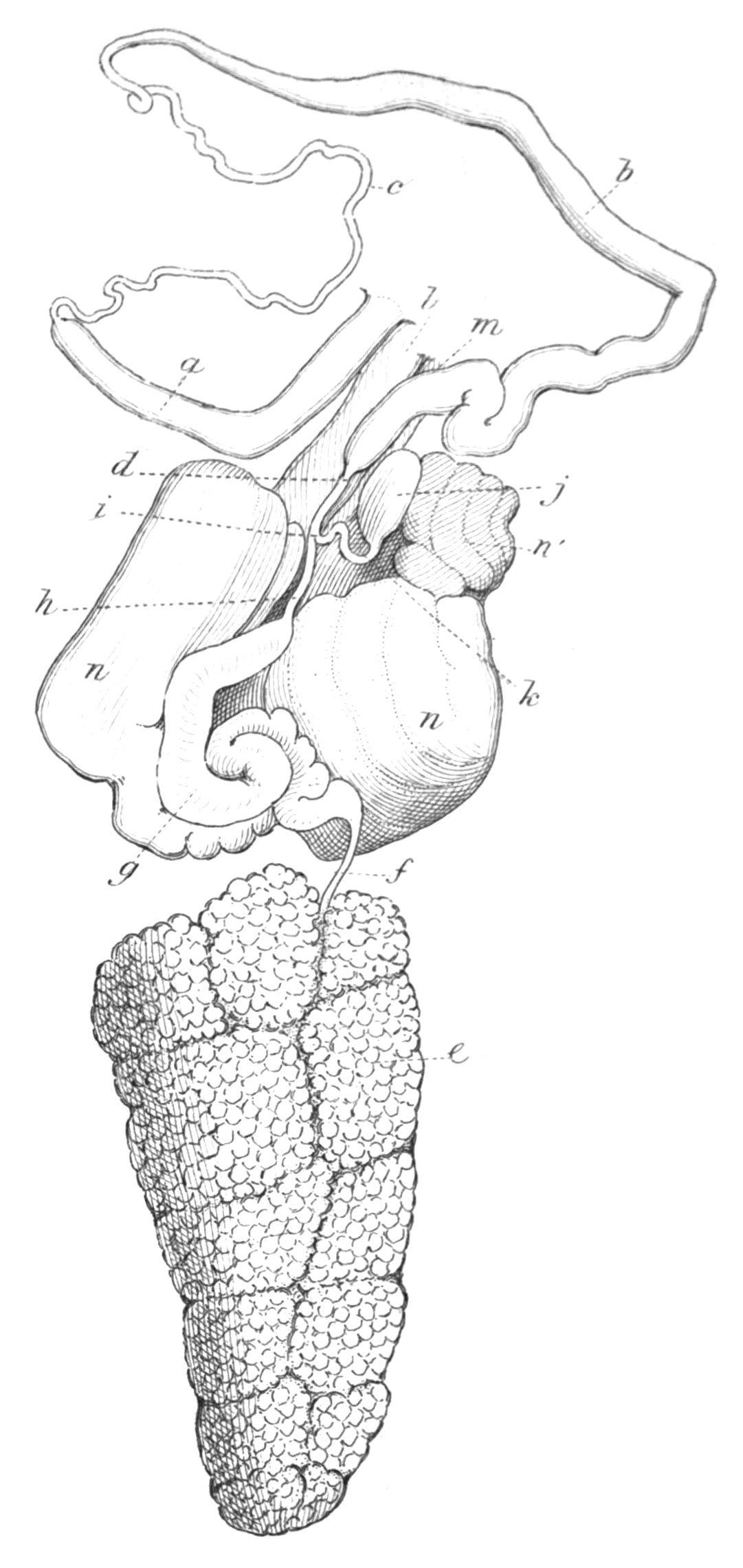
Drawing of reproductive system of Fiona pinnata.

Reproductive system: There are two genital openings on the right side of the head behind the oral tentacle: the opening for the penis and for the (hermaphroditic) genital pore. The reproductive system and the mucous gland is the same as in the genus Aeolidia. The only difference is that there is a distinct vas deferens in Fiona pinnata.

On laying open the dorsal skin, the reproductive organs are found, as usual, to occupy much of the visceral cavity, having the stomach and intestine lying above, and the buccal mass in front. The penis is placed in advance of the other parts, and, in its retracted state, is long, rather slender, and linear. The penis has a conical form during mating. The outer extremity of the penis leads through the wall of the visceral cavity to the external opening, and on its way the sheath or external covering of the penis becomes firmly attached to the muscles of the skin.

The ovotestis (hermaphrodite gland) is yellow with white dots. The ovotestis fills the posterior portion of the visceral cavity, and is composed of large irregular lobules made up almost entirely of eggs, and packed into a dense mass, tapering a little behind and truncated in front.

The testis is a stout flesh-coloured tube, two or three times convoluted. It tapers at one extremity into a long slender duct or vas deferens, which is united to the inner extremity of the penis. The other extremity of the testis suddenly contracts into an equally slender duct, but very much shorter, and is joined by this duct to the oviduct.

The spermoviduct leaves the anterior border of the ovary as a slender tube, but, almost immediately dilating, equals the diameter of the testis. This dilated portion of the spermoviduct rests between the lobes of the mucous gland, and is at first somewhat sacculated and convoluted. Spermoviduct then passes forward and suddenly contracts to its original diameter, and then advances to the anterior border of the mucous gland and receives the duct from the testis as before described. It then bends a little backward and is shortly joined by a duct from the spermatheca. Spermatheca is a small oval membranous sac, lying between the lobes and at the front margin of the mucous gland. The duct, which is short and slender, passes from one end of the sac, and, at the point where the duct is united to the oviduct, it is joined by a tube which comes from the external orifice immediately within the female opening. This tube is the vagina or copulatory channel, and is cemented to the upper wall of the female channel. Just before the vagina reaches the duct of the spermatheca and oviduct, it gives off a branch which sinks into the female channel, and so far may be looked upon as a portion of the oviduct, for it is by this branch that the eggs find their way to the female outlet.

The mucous gland for the secretion of the mucus-like envelope of the eggs, is composed of two lateral lobes separated on the upper surface by a deep fissure. These lobes are semipellucid and are formed of a coarsely convoluted tube, that is on its right side anterior portion opake and flesh-coloured. The two lobes open into the female channel, which is wide and quite long.

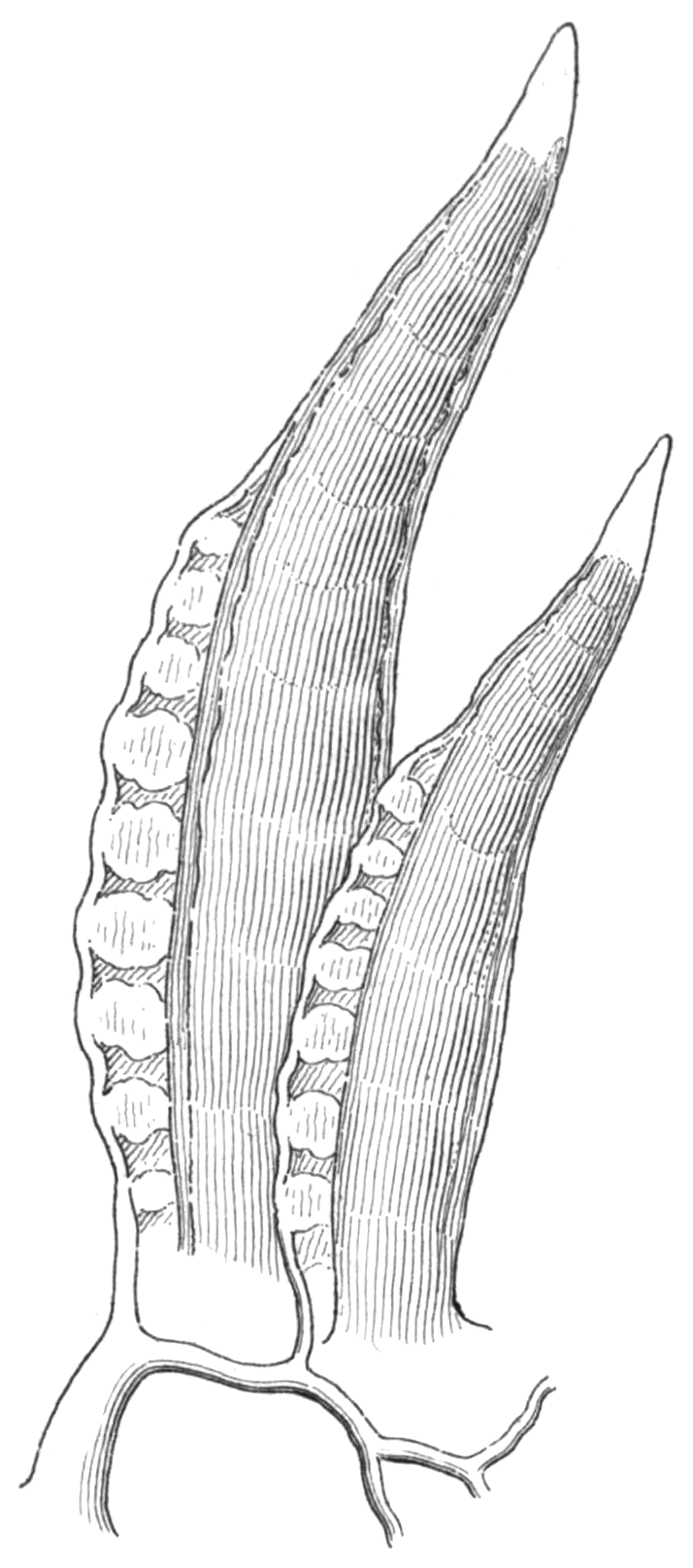
Drawing of cerata of Fiona pinnata. There are small afferent (leading into heart) vessels in cerata with puckered membranous fringe on the inner sides. The vessels are leading to great median trunk and to the heart.

=== Circulatory and respiratory system ===
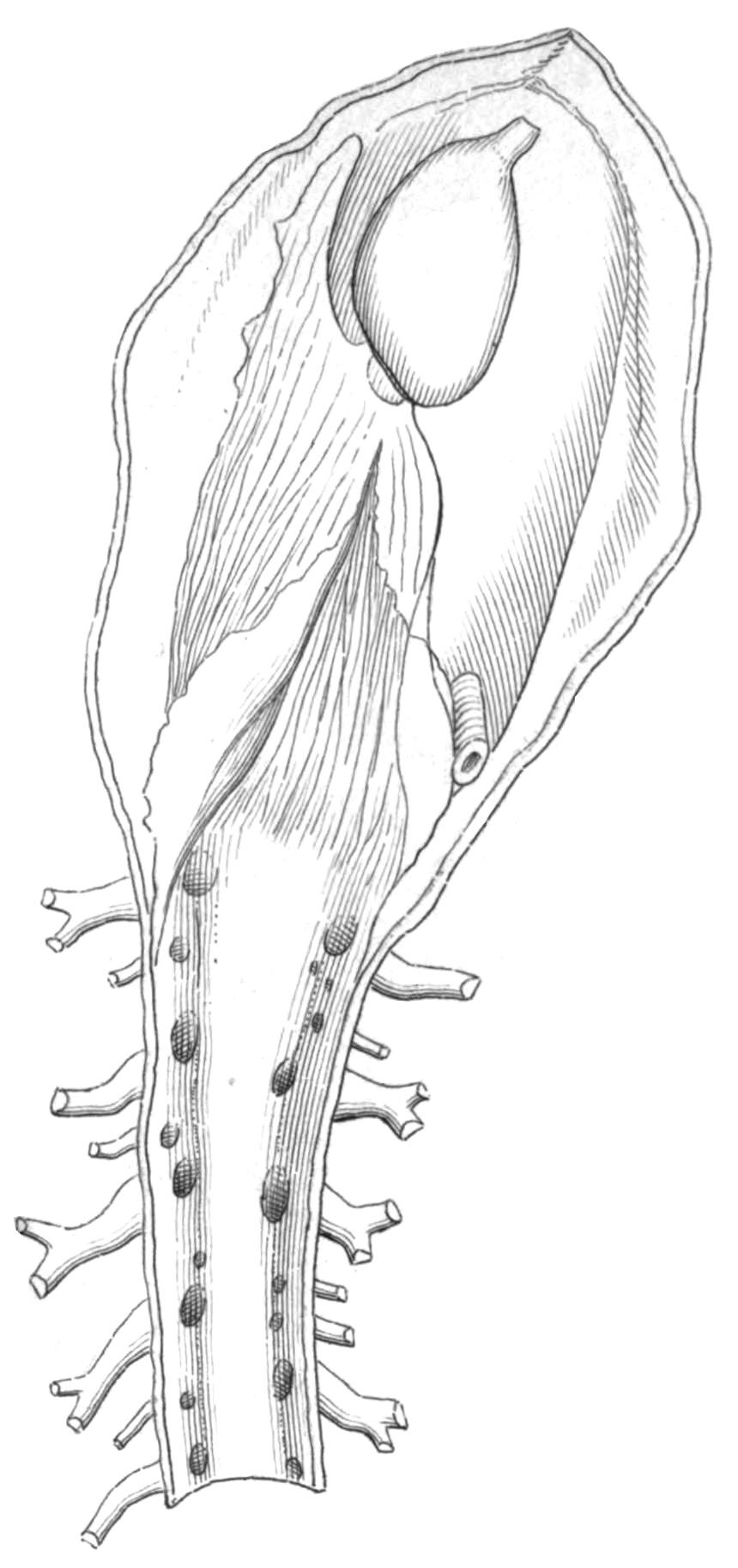
Drawing of heart and open pericardium of Fiona pinnata. There is a ventricle (oval structure on the top) and a part aorta leading from vetricle, auricle (in the centre of the image), "portal heart" (a small tube like structure on the right). The vessels are leading to great median trunk.

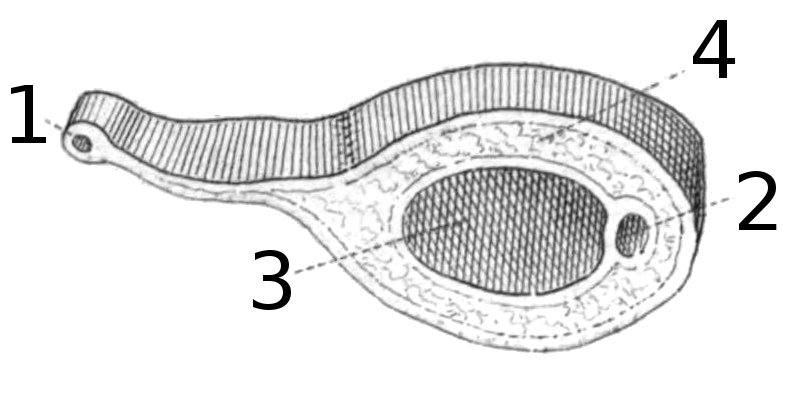
Drawing of cross section of ceras of Fiona pinnata. There are small afferent vessels (1) in cerata with puckerd membranous fringe on the inner sides. The vessels are leading to great median trunk. Efferent vessels (2), gland (3) a "normal" tissue of cerata (4).

The circulatory system and respiratory system is unique in this animal, because nearly the whole of these vessels are distinctly visible on the skin of the back, rising above the general surface. The heart is situated about in the middle of the back, where it forms a large oval swelling immediately below the skin, having the generative organs beneath. From the posterior end of the heart there a broad elevated but rounded ridge passes down the median line of the back to the caudal end of the body. This ridge is joined on either side by numerous similarly elevated branches, which divide and subdivide as they approach the pallial-like expansion on the sides of the body. The whole of these branches and their subdivisions, standing boldly up from the general surface of the skin, have the branchial cerata set along them, and they give off twigs, which pass up the margin of the broad, flounced, membranous expansion of the cerata.

On opening the heart from above, the ventricle and auricle are found to occupy a well-defined oval pericardium. The ventricle is large and muscular, of an irregular elliptical form, giving off the aorta in front, which in the usual manner supplies branches to the various organs. The auricle is united to it behind, a little on the left side. The auricle is delicate in comparison with the ventricle, but is nevertheless abundantly supplied with muscular fibres; it lies diagonally in the pericardium, having the left side advanced almost to the front of that organ where it receives a trunk-vein from the skin. The right side of the auricle stretches backward, and receives a similar trunk-vein from the skin of this side almost at the posterior extremity of the pericardium.

On laying the dorsal wall of the auricle open, its cavity is found to be continuous with that of the great posterior elevated median ridge or trunk vein before alluded to, and on opening this trunk-vein the various lateral branches are observed debouching into it on either side. It is therefore evident that this trunk-vein, which lies entirely within the skin, is the great posterior afferent or branchio-cardiac vein, and that all the elevated branches coming to it from the cerata are also afferent vessels. This way are cerata used for breathing as a specialized breathing organ. The oxygenated blood from the heart leads to the aorta, to sinuses where it oxygenates tissues. Deoxygenated blood goes to efferent branchial vessels in cerata. These efferent vessels can be seen in a transverse section of the cerata as widish canal to pass up the opposite margin. From efferent vessels the blood goes into afferent vessel, where is gets an oxygen. Dorsal skin also partly serves as a breathing organ.

=== Excretory system ===
Excretory system: The renal pore is between heart and anus.

=== Nervous system ===
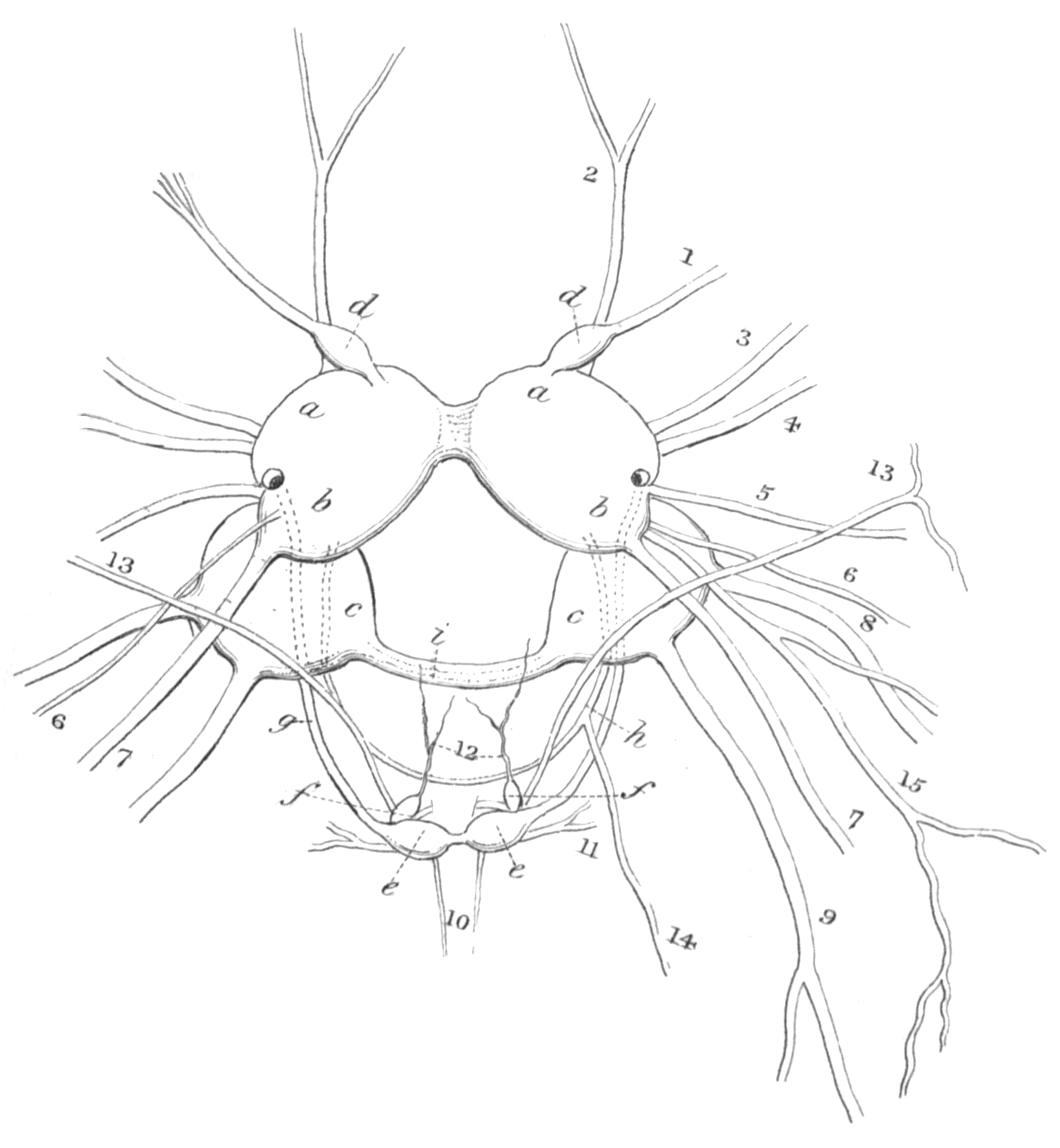
Drawing of nervous system of Fiona pinnata showing central ganglia and their nerves.

Nervous system: The cerebral ganglia are placed at the commencement of the oesophagus. There are as usual four pairs of supra-oesophageal ganglia, though at first sight only three are apparent. The cerebroid and branchial are completely fused. Branchial ganglia form two oval central masses, resting upon the upper surface of the oesophagus, one on each side of the median line, across which they are united at the anterior extremity by a short but distinct commissure. Their posterior extremities diverge and are slightly bilobed, marking the boundaries of the two ganglia of which each mass is composed, — the anterior lobe indicating the cerebroid, the posterior the branchial. (Branchial ganglia are also fused in Onchidoris bilamellata and in Lamellidoris aspera.) The pedial ganglions are irregularly rounded, being equal in bulk to the cerebroid and branchial together. They lie against the sides of the oesophagus, and are united to the under surface of the central masses. The fourth pair of ganglions are the olfactory: they are well developed, though very much smaller than those just described, and are joined by a short commissure to the upper surface of the anterior margins of the cerebroid ganglions.

The infra-oesophageal ganglions are placed in the usual situation on the buccal mass, below the oesophagus. The buccal ganglions are scarcely larger than the olfactory, and are of an oval form, their inner extremities being connected across the median line by a short commissure; their outer extremities receive a cord of communication from each of the cerebroid ganglions. Two minute elliptical ganglions are almost sessile on the anterior border of the buccal ganglions; these are the gastro-oesophageal ganglions. Thus in all there are six pairs of ganglions; four above the gullet, and two below it.

The first pair of nerves come from the olfactory ganglions, and are large, but of no great length; they divide into several filaments as they enter the base of the dorsal tentacles. The second pair pass from the under surface of the anterior border of the cerebroid ganglions, not far from their union with the olfactory ganglions; these nerves go to supply the upper surface of the channel of the mouth. The third and fourth pairs of nerves issue from the same ganglions, but considerably behind the second pair; these also go to the channel of the mouth; the third probably sending a branch to the oral tentacles. A strong cord passes off close to the root of the fourth pair: these cords curve round the oesophagus and are united to the outer extremities of the buccal ganglions, forming the anterior collar. The fifth pair of nerves issue apparently from the outer border of the branchial ganglia, and go to the skin by the side of the head. The sixth pair are small, and come from the upper surface of the branchial ganglions; these nerves go to the skin of the sides of the back. The seventh, much larger than the sixth, emerge from the posterior margin of the same ganglions, and supply the dorsal skin, and apparently likewise the cerata. These are the branchial nerves. The eighth and ninth pairs are large nerves; they issue from the outer border of the pedial ganglions and go to the foot. The posterior margins of these ganglions are united by a stout, shortish commissure, composed of two or three cords, which, passing below the gullet, form the great oesophageal collar. The tenth pair of nerves are given off from the posterior margin of the buccal ganglions; these pass into the buccal mass and go to supply the tongue. The eleventh pair, issuing from the outer extremities of the buccal ganglions, are distributed to the muscles of the buccal mass. The twelfth pair come from the apex of the gastro-oesophageal ganglions, and being applied to the gullet, each divides into two branches, one of which supplies the upper portion of that tube, the other, passing down it, goes to the stomach as in the other nudibranchs. The thirteenth pair are large; these are the hepatic nerves; they issue from the buccal mass and probably (as in genus Aeolidia) are connected at their origin with ganglions, which must be looked upon as belonging to the sympathetic system. Immediately on emerging from the buccal mass, they are connected to the buccal ganglions at their point of union with the gastrooesophageal, and then, arching outwards and upwards, pass from within the anterior oesophageal collar, and go to supply the glands of the cerata.

Other nerve include the "genital nerve" a single nerve given off from a delicate collar, the ends of which are united to the under-surface of the central masses, just where they are connected to the pedial ganglions. Another nerve, which was apparently also distributed to the genitalia; this seemed to come from the right branchial ganglion, at its union with the pedial. These two nerves are probably leading from visceral ganglia.

== Ecology ==
This nudibranch is pelagic in a similar way to the nudibranch Glaucus atlanticus. Unlike some other pelagic animals, this species cannot swim or even float in water by itself, thus although it is pelagic, it is not considered to be planktonic.

Fiona pinnata has even been found on both adult and juvenile loggerhead sea turtles from the Canary Islands.

=== Feeding habits ===
Fiona pinnata attacks and preys on barnacles of the genus Lepas: gooseneck barnacle Lepas anatifera, Lepas anserifera, Lepas fascicularis, Lepas hilli, and Lepas testudinata, which grow on floating debris. It can attack other barnacles, but only damaged ones: Pollicipes polymerus and Balanus glandula. It can also eat barnacles on the genus Alepas (see also Beeman & Williams 1980) and cnidarians Velella velella and Porpita porpita. The colour of the digestive gland in the cerata changes to bright blue when the animal feeds on Velella. Some authors have noted that Fiona pinnata does not feed on the siphonophore Physalia physalis (see also Bayer 1963), but some authors mention Physalia as its prey.

=== Life cycle ===
The stadium of the veliger larva of Fiona pinnata lasts five days. Then it undergoes a metamorphosis into a slug. The New Zealand malacologist Richard Cardeu Willan (1979) published a theory that the veliger can delay its metamorphosis if it does not find suitable floating habitat to attach itself to.

Fiona pinnata grows very rapidly. It has one of the highest growth rates among all nudibranchs (that is compared with benthic nudibranchs, the only ones for which the growth rates are known). The only species known to grow faster than this is Doridella obscura.

Fiona pinnata can grow from 8 mm to 20 mm in 4 days.

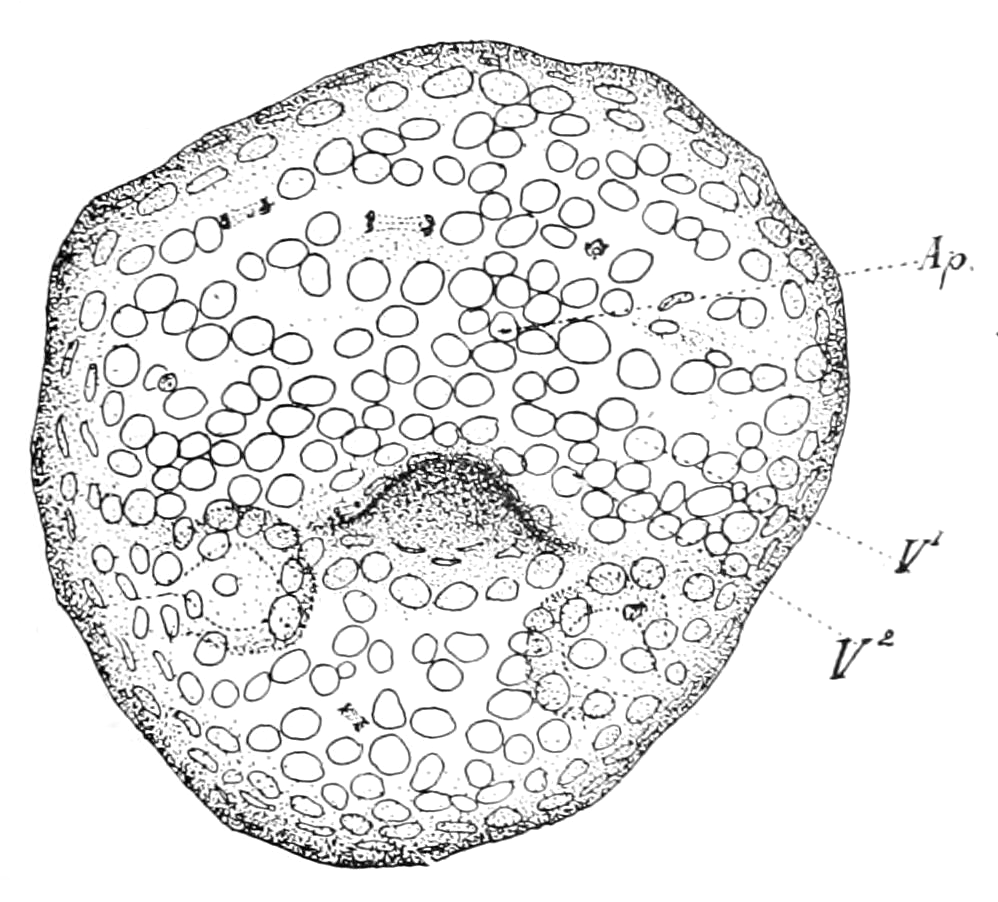
Drawing of anterior view of young veliger of Fiona pinnata.

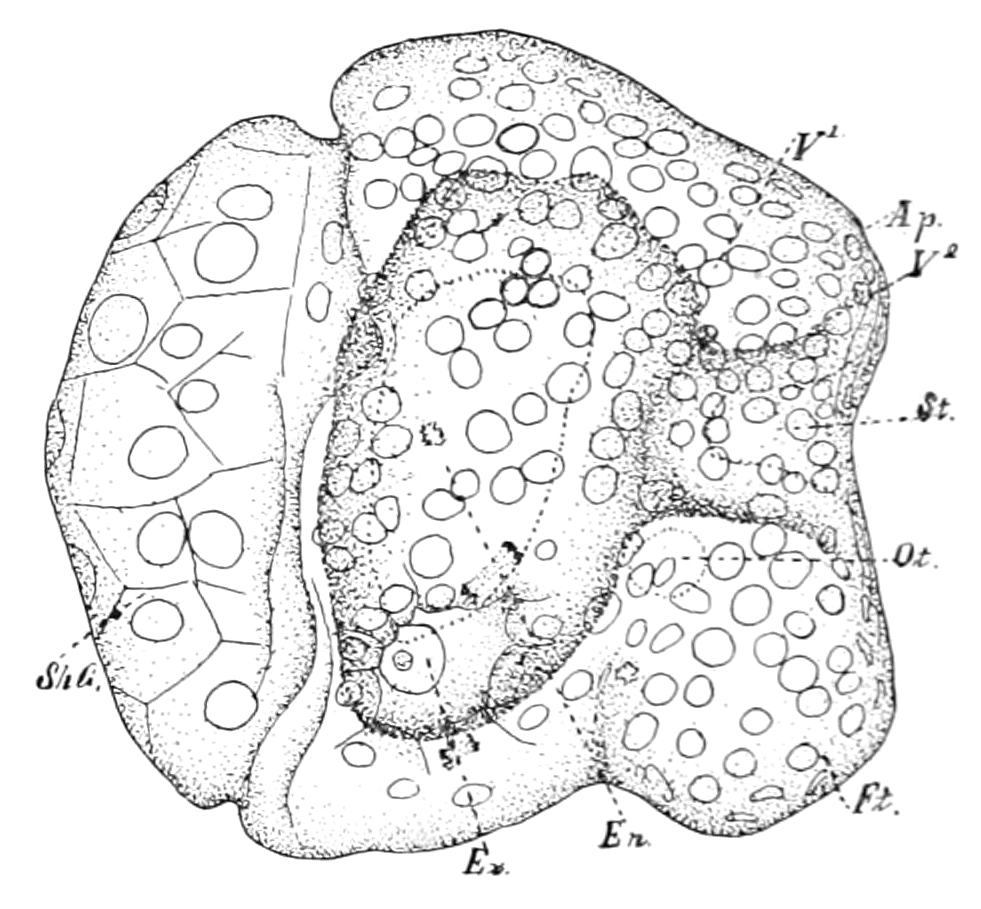
Drawing of right side of young veliger.

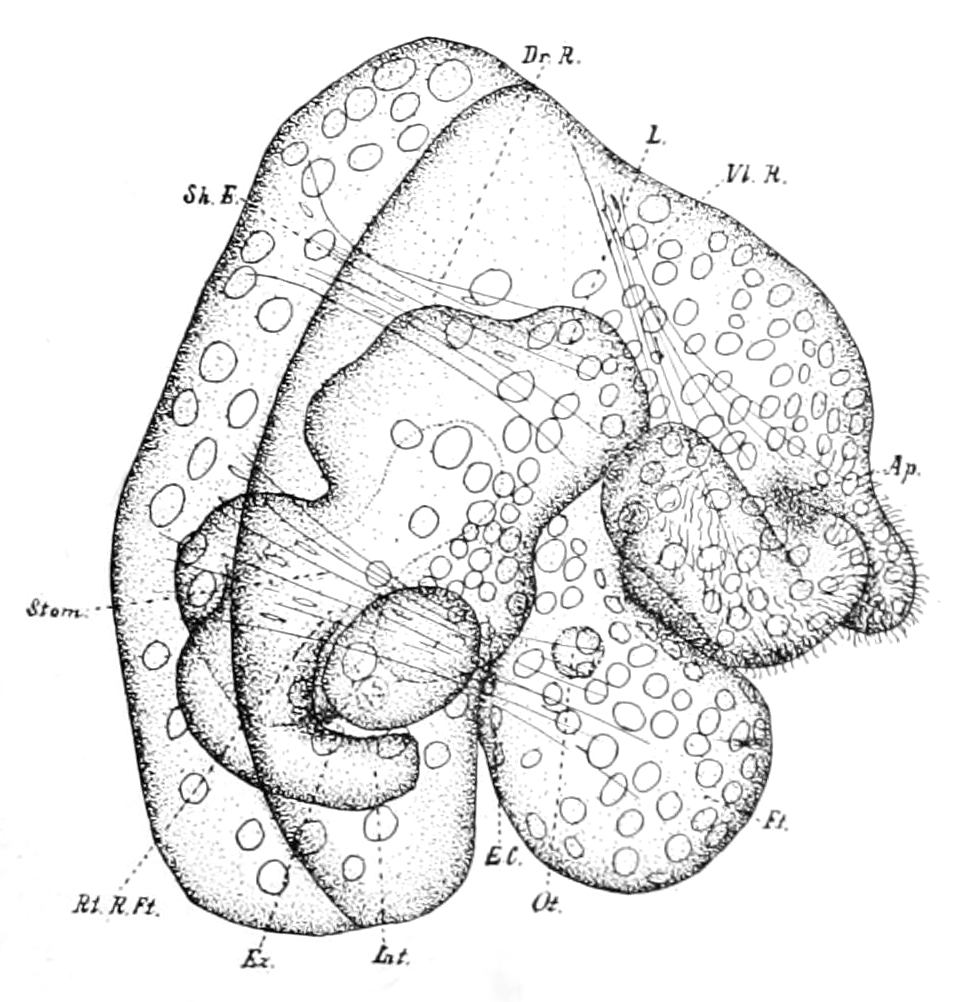
Drawing of right side of veliger.

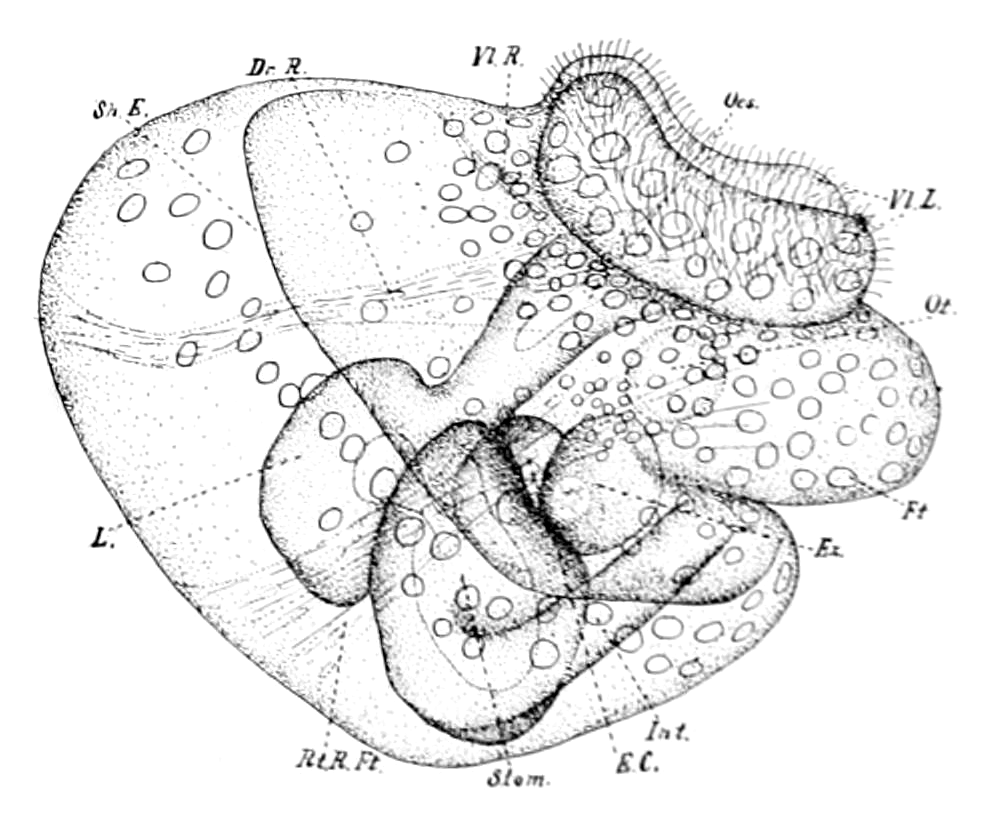
Drawing of right side of veliger.
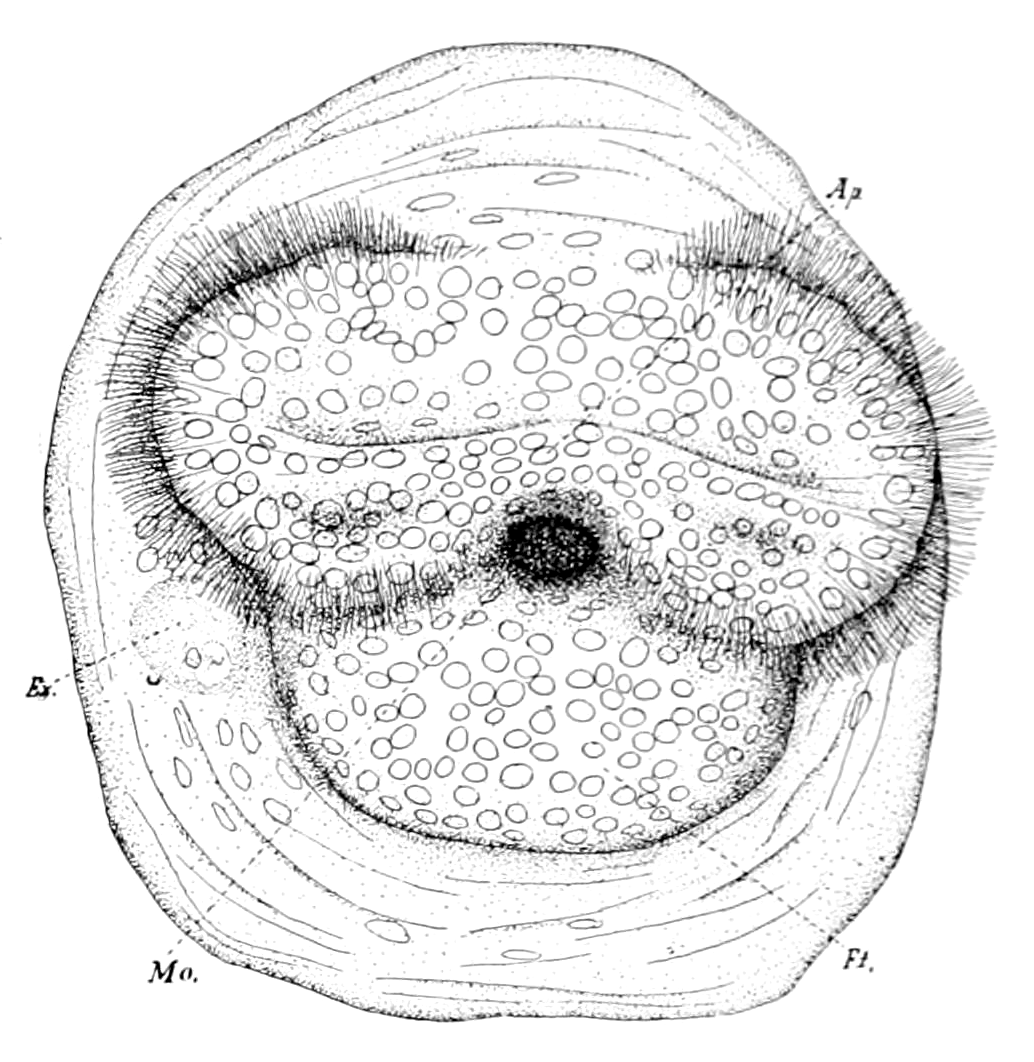
Anterior view of well developed veliger.

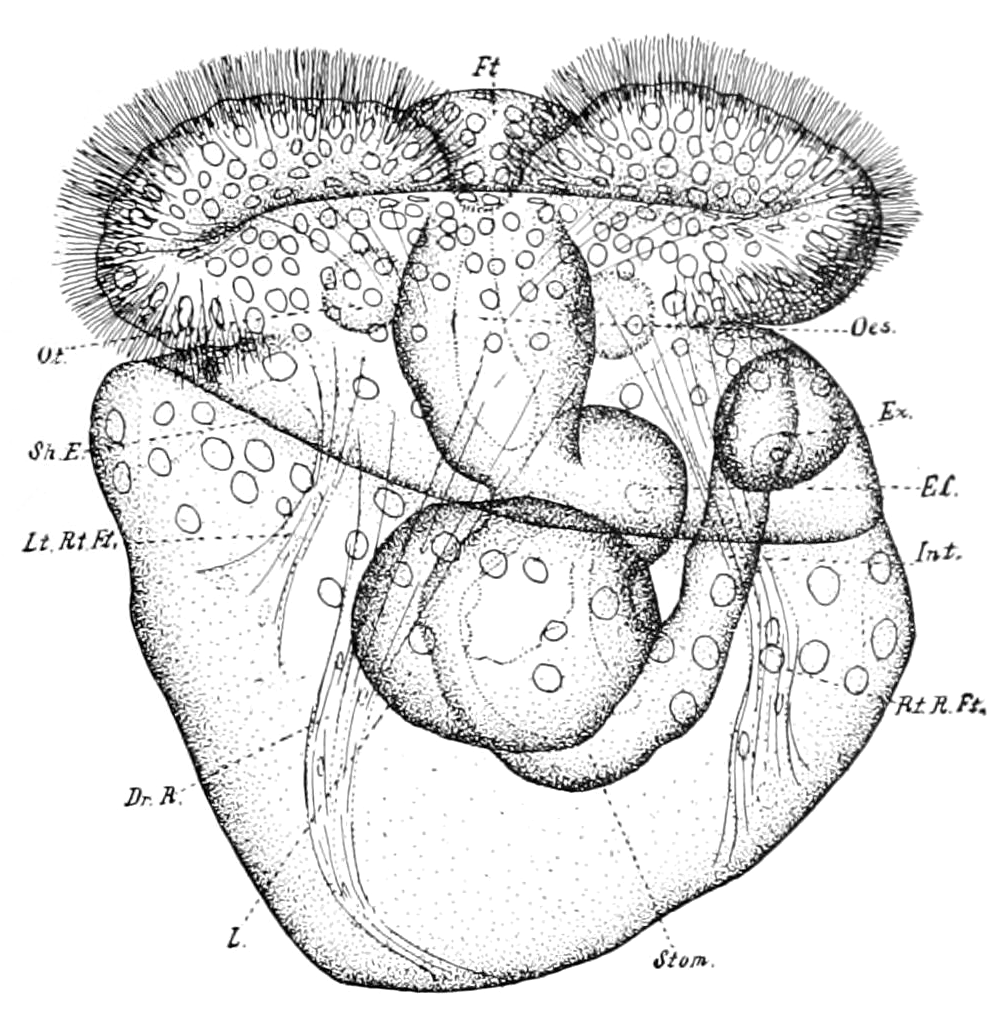
Dorsal view of well developed veliger.

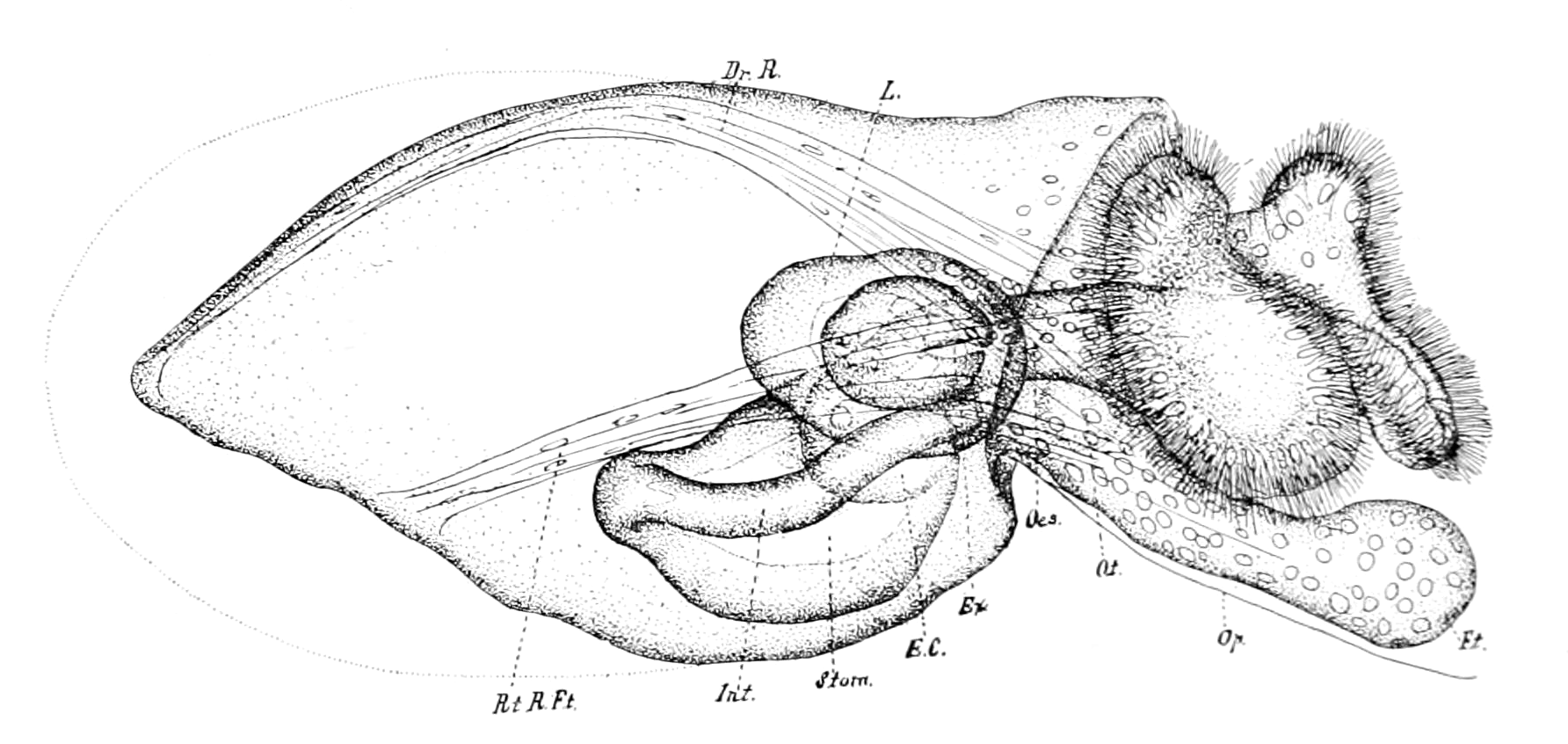
Right side of veliger just before hatching.

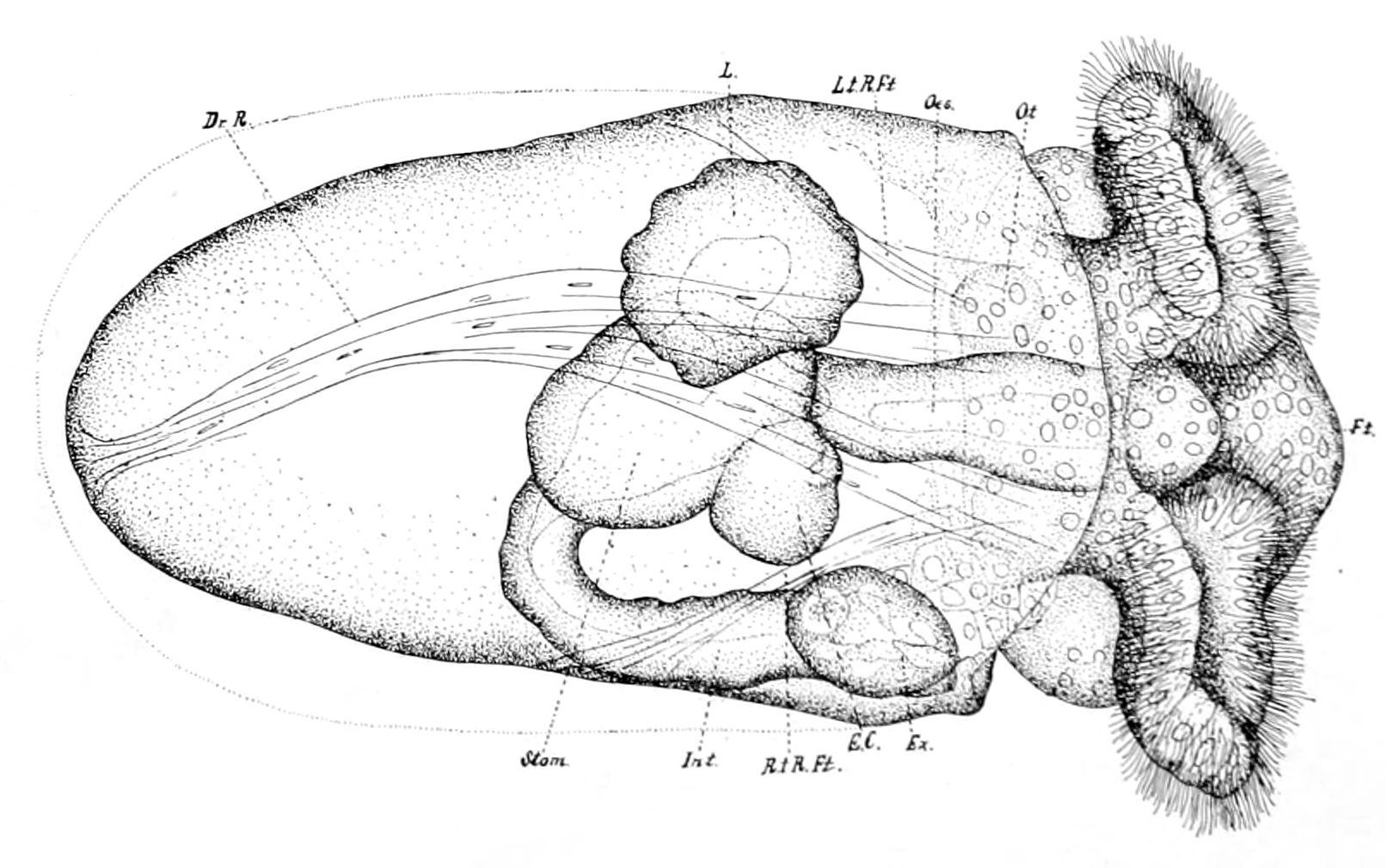
Dorsal view of veliger just before hatching.
