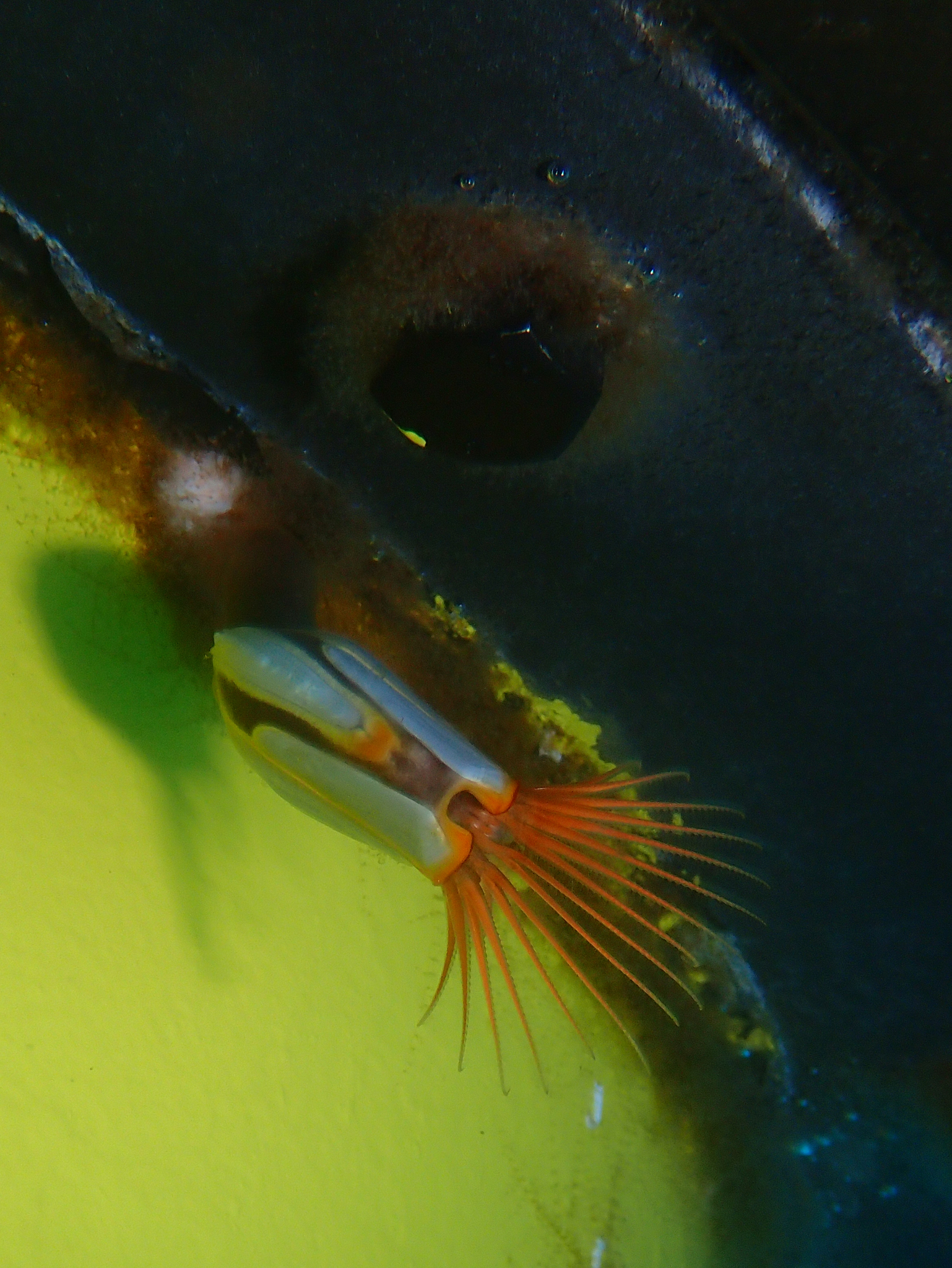
- Lepas hillii, Italy

Scientific classification
- Kingdom: Animalia
- Phylum: Arthropoda
- Class: Thecostraca
- Subclass: Cirripedia
- Order: Scalpellomorpha
- Family: Lepadidae
- Genus: Lepas
- Species: L. hillii

Binomial name
- Lepas hillii (Leach, 1818)

= Lepas hillii =

Species of barnacle

Lepas hillii is a species of goose barnacle in the family Lepadidae.
