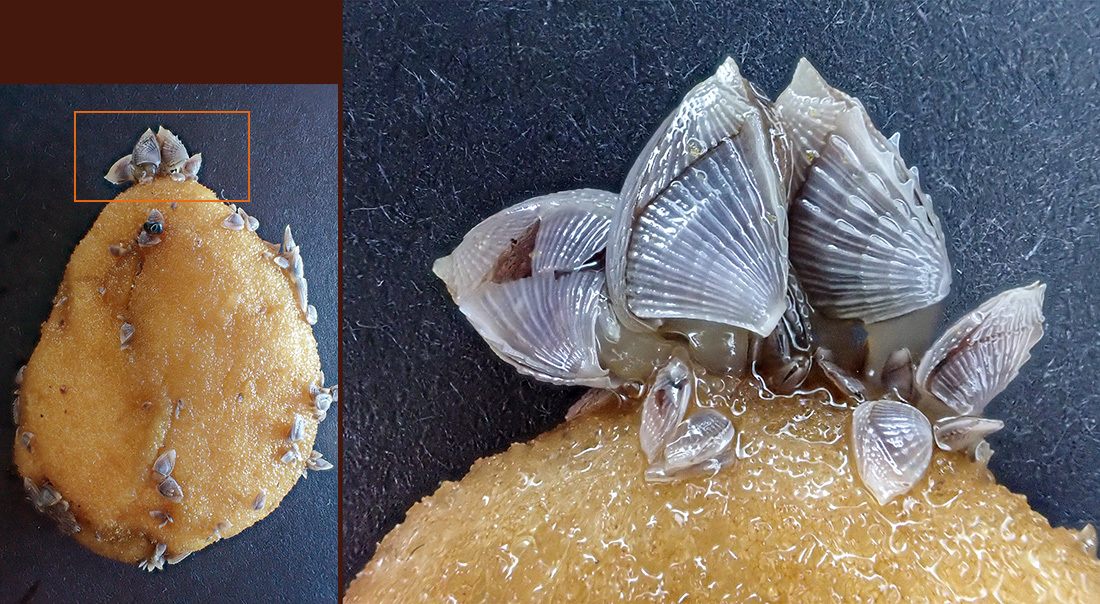
- Lepas pectinata, Italy

Scientific classification
- Kingdom: Animalia
- Phylum: Arthropoda
- Class: Thecostraca
- Subclass: Cirripedia
- Order: Scalpellomorpha
- Family: Lepadidae
- Genus: Lepas
- Species: L. pectinata

Binomial name
- Lepas pectinata Spengler, 1793

= Lepas pectinata =

Species of barnacle

Lepas pectinata, the small goose barnacle, is a species of goose barnacle in the family Lepadidae.
