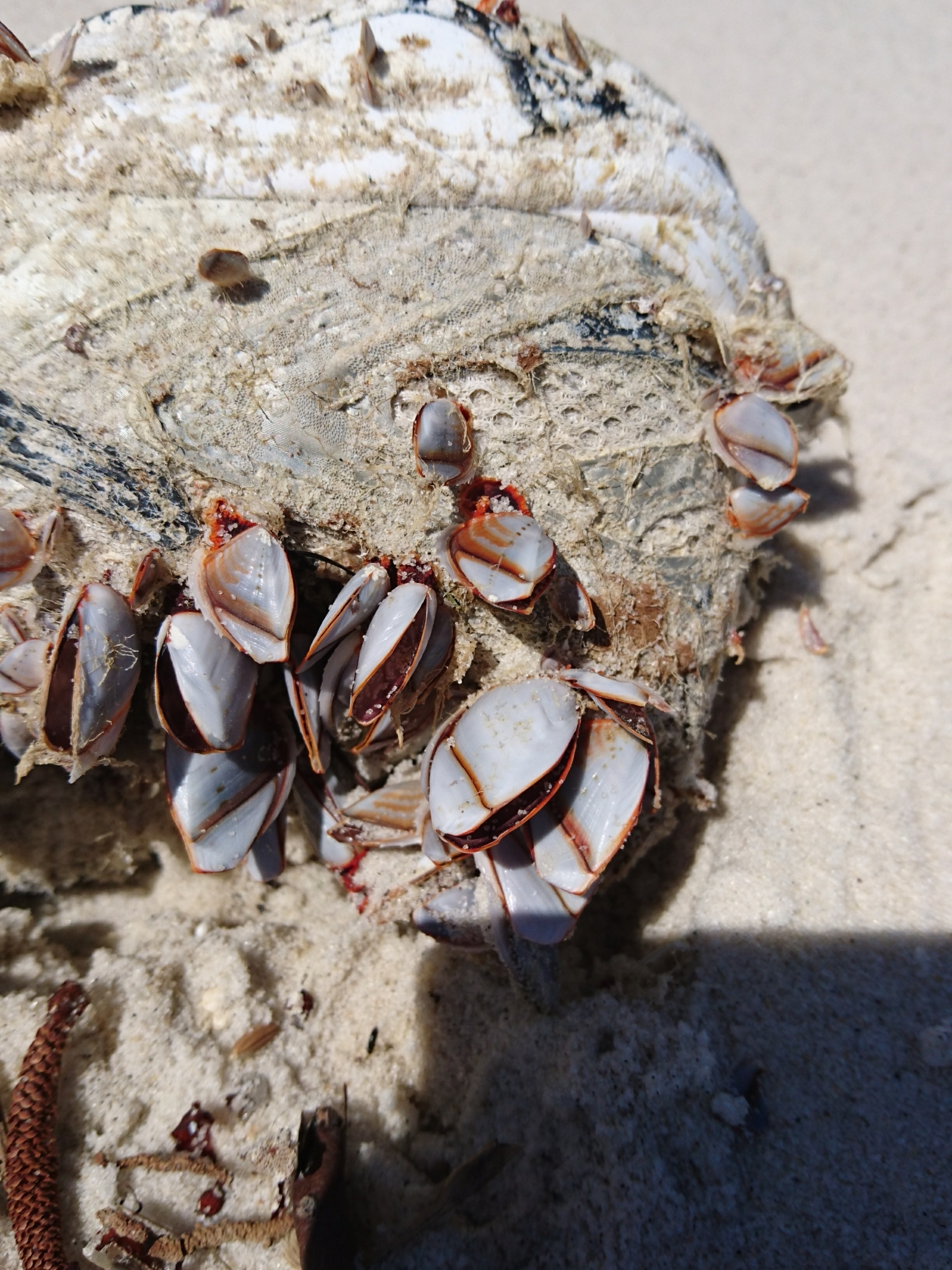
- Lepas indica, Mississippi, USA

Scientific classification
- Kingdom: Animalia
- Phylum: Arthropoda
- Class: Thecostraca
- Subclass: Cirripedia
- Order: Scalpellomorpha
- Family: Lepadidae
- Genus: Lepas
- Species: L. indica

Binomial name
- Lepas indica Annandale, 1909

= Lepas indica =

Species of barnacle

Lepas indica is a species of goose barnacle in the family Lepadidae.
