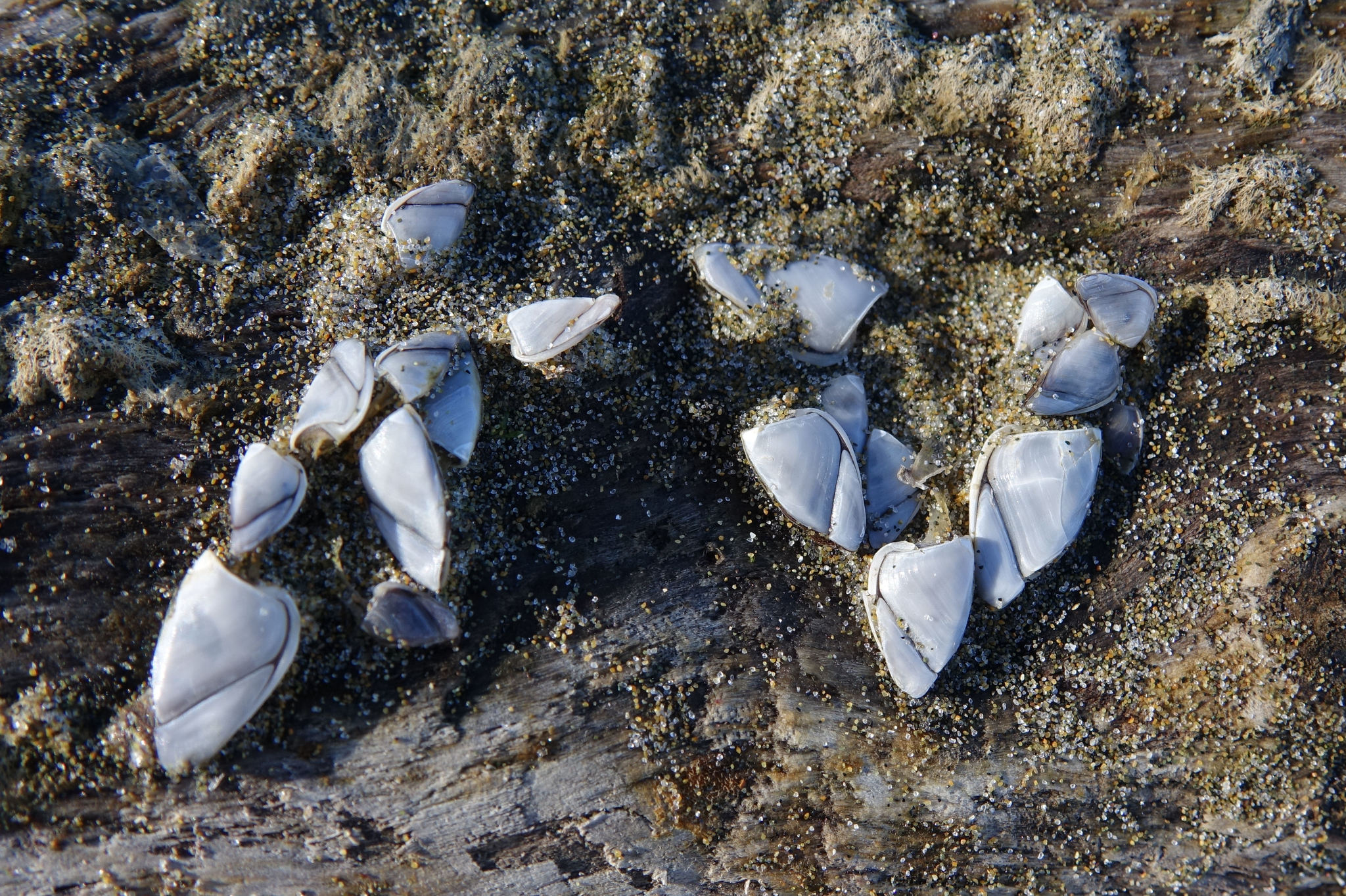
- Lepas australis

Scientific classification
- Kingdom: Animalia
- Phylum: Arthropoda
- Class: Thecostraca
- Subclass: Cirripedia
- Order: Scalpellomorpha
- Family: Lepadidae
- Genus: Lepas
- Species: L. australis

Binomial name
- Lepas australis Darwin, 1851

= Lepas australis =

Species of barnacle

Lepas australis is a species of goose barnacle in the family Lepadidae. It is found in New Zealand.
