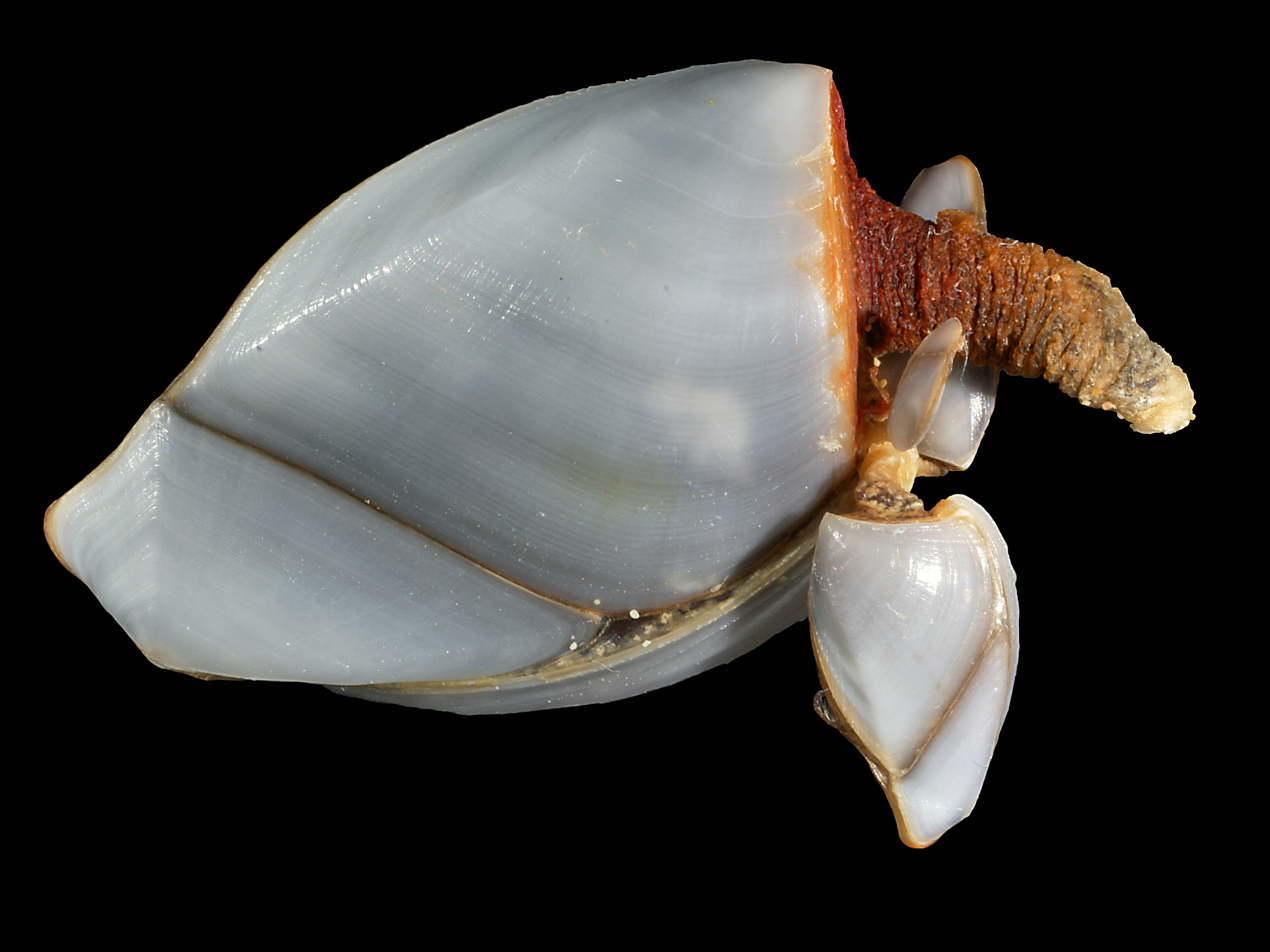
- Lepas anserifera

Scientific classification
- Kingdom: Animalia
- Phylum: Arthropoda
- Clade: Pancrustacea
- Class: Thecostraca
- Subclass: Cirripedia
- Order: Scalpellomorpha
- Family: Lepadidae
- Genus: Lepas; Linnaeus, 1758

Species
- see text

= Lepas =

Genus of barnacles

Lepas is a genus of goose barnacles in the family Lepadidae.

== Species ==
Species in the genus include:

- Lepas anatifera Linnaeus, 1758
- Lepas anserifera Linnaeus, 1767
- Lepas australis Darwin, 1851
- Lepas hillii Leach, 1818
- Lepas indica Annandale, 1909
- Lepas pectinata Spengler, 1793
- Lepas tanakai Karasawa & Kobayashi, 2025
- Lepas testudinata Aurivillius, 1894
Images of Lepas
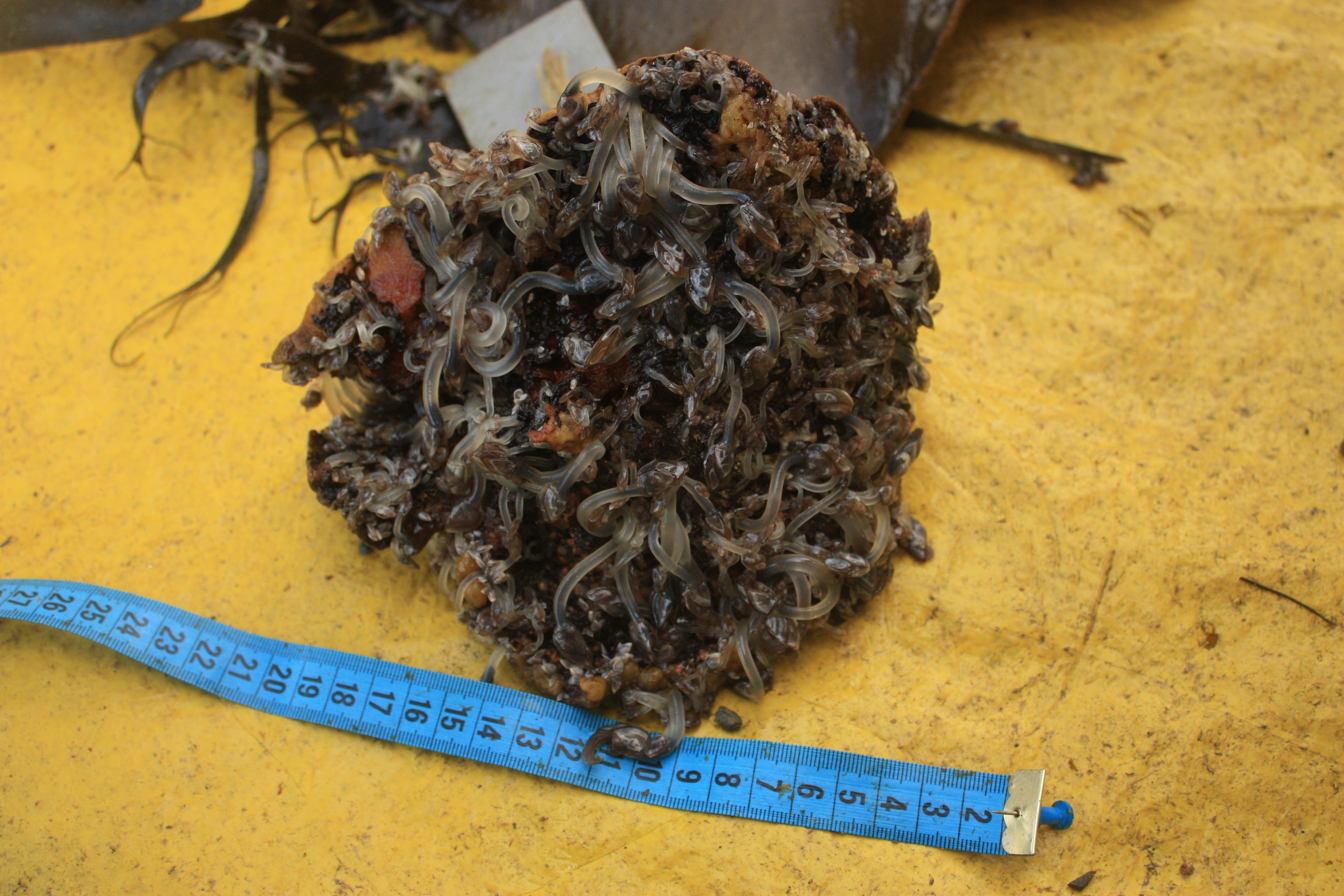
A detached holdfast of Durvillaea antarctica colonised by Lepas australis

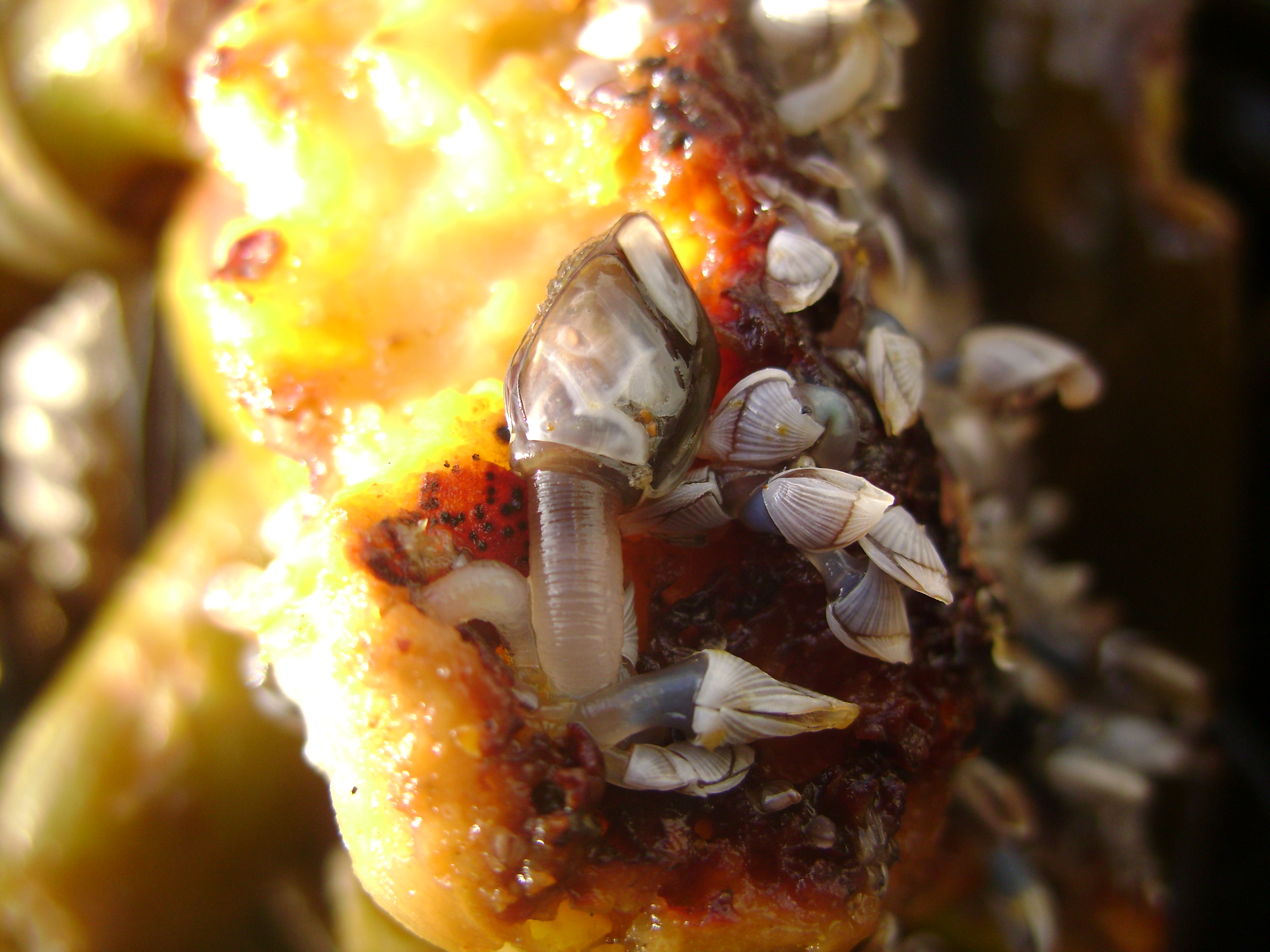
A closer photo of L. australis on the same kelp holdfast
