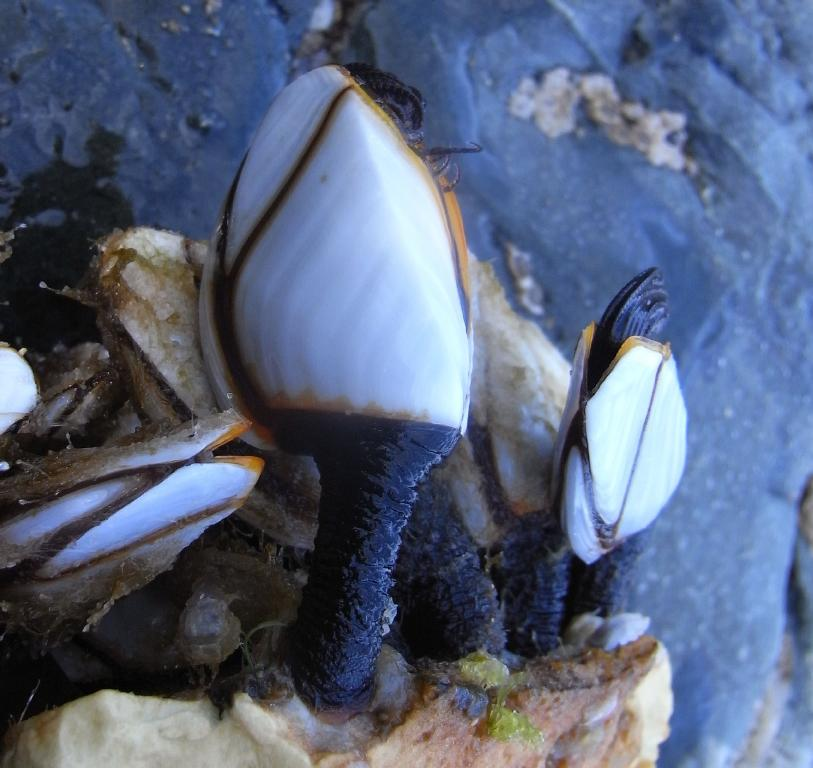

Scientific classification
- Kingdom: Animalia
- Phylum: Arthropoda
- Clade: Pancrustacea
- Class: Thecostraca
- Subclass: Cirripedia
- Order: Scalpellomorpha
- Family: Lepadidae
- Genus: Lepas
- Species: L. anatifera

Binomial name
- Lepas anatifera Linnaeus, 1758

= Lepas anatifera =

Species of barnacle

Lepas anatifera, commonly known as the pelagic gooseneck barnacle or smooth gooseneck barnacle, is a species of barnacle in the family Lepadidae. These barnacles are found, often in large numbers, attached by their flexible stalks to floating timber, the hulls of ships, piers, pilings, seaweed, and various sorts of flotsam.

== Description ==
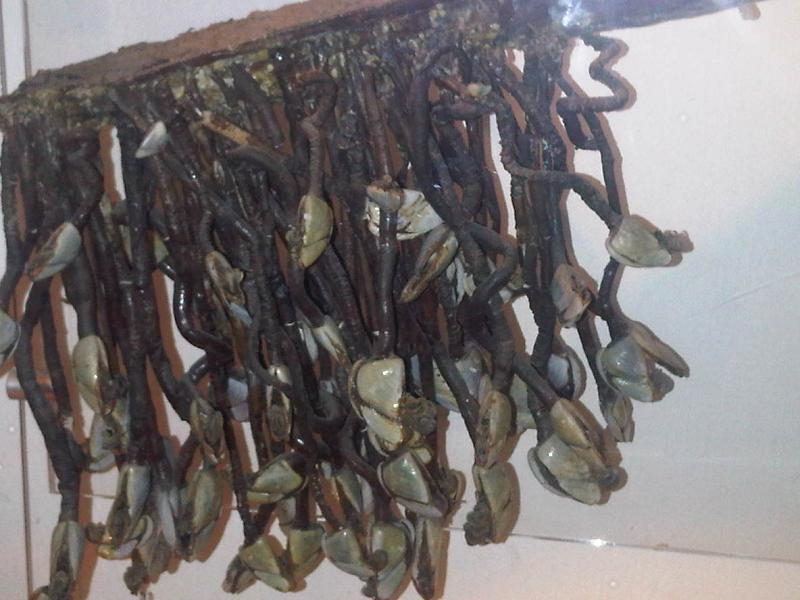
Barnacles dangling from a piece of timber, from the Natural History Museum, London

The body or capitulum of Lepas anatifera is supported by a long, flexible stalk or peduncle. There are five smooth, translucent plates, edged with scarlet and separated by narrow gaps. The plates have growth lines parallel with their margins and a few faint radial sculpture lines. Inside the capitulum, the barnacle has a head, a thorax, and a vestigial abdomen. A number of brown, filamentous cirri or feeding tentacles project from between the plates. The peduncle is tough and a purplish-brown colour. The capitulum may grow to a length of 5 centimetres (2.0 in) and the peduncle varies between 4 centimetres (1.6 in) and 80 centimetres (31 in).

== Distribution ==
Lepas anatifera has a cosmopolitan distribution and is found in tropical and subtropical seas worldwide. Because it frequently is attached to objects carried into colder seas by currents, such as the North Atlantic Drift, it often is found well away from its place of origin and in waters too cold for it to reproduce. In this way, it has been documented in Norway, the Shetland Islands, the Faeroe Islands, Iceland, and Spitsbergen.

== Biology ==
Lepas anatifera is a hermaphrodite and starts to breed when it is about 2.5 centimetres (1 in) long. Fertilisation is internal and the eggs are brooded inside the mantle for a week before emerging as free-swimming nauplius larvae. After further development, drifting as part of the plankton, these settle onto floating objects.

Lepas anatifera has long been known to grow on sea turtles, but in 2008, some small specimens were found attached to an American crocodile (Crocodylus acutus) on the Pacific coast of Mexico. That crocodile species mostly inhabits mangrove swamps and river estuaries, but it is salt tolerant, and sometimes is found in marine environments. In this instance, the size of the goose-neck barnacles indicated that the crocodile must have been in the sea for at least a week. That is the first time that Lepas anatifera has been recorded as an epibiont of a crocodilian.

== Origin of the name ==
In thirteenth-century England the word "barnacle" was used for a species of waterfowl, the barnacle goose (Branta leucopsis). This bird breeds in the Arctic, but winters in the British Isles so its nests and eggs were never seen by the British. At the time, it was thought that the gooseneck barnacles that wash up occasionally on the shore had spontaneously generated from the rotting wood to which they were attached, and therefore, that the geese might be generated similarly. Credence to the idea was provided by the tuft of brown cirri that protruded from the capitulum of the crustaceans that resembled the down of an unhatched gosling. Popular belief linked the two species and a writer in 1678 wrote "multitudes of little Shells; having within them little Birds perfectly shap'd, supposed to be Barnacles [by which he meant barnacle geese]."

== See also ==
- Goose barnacle
- Pedunculata
