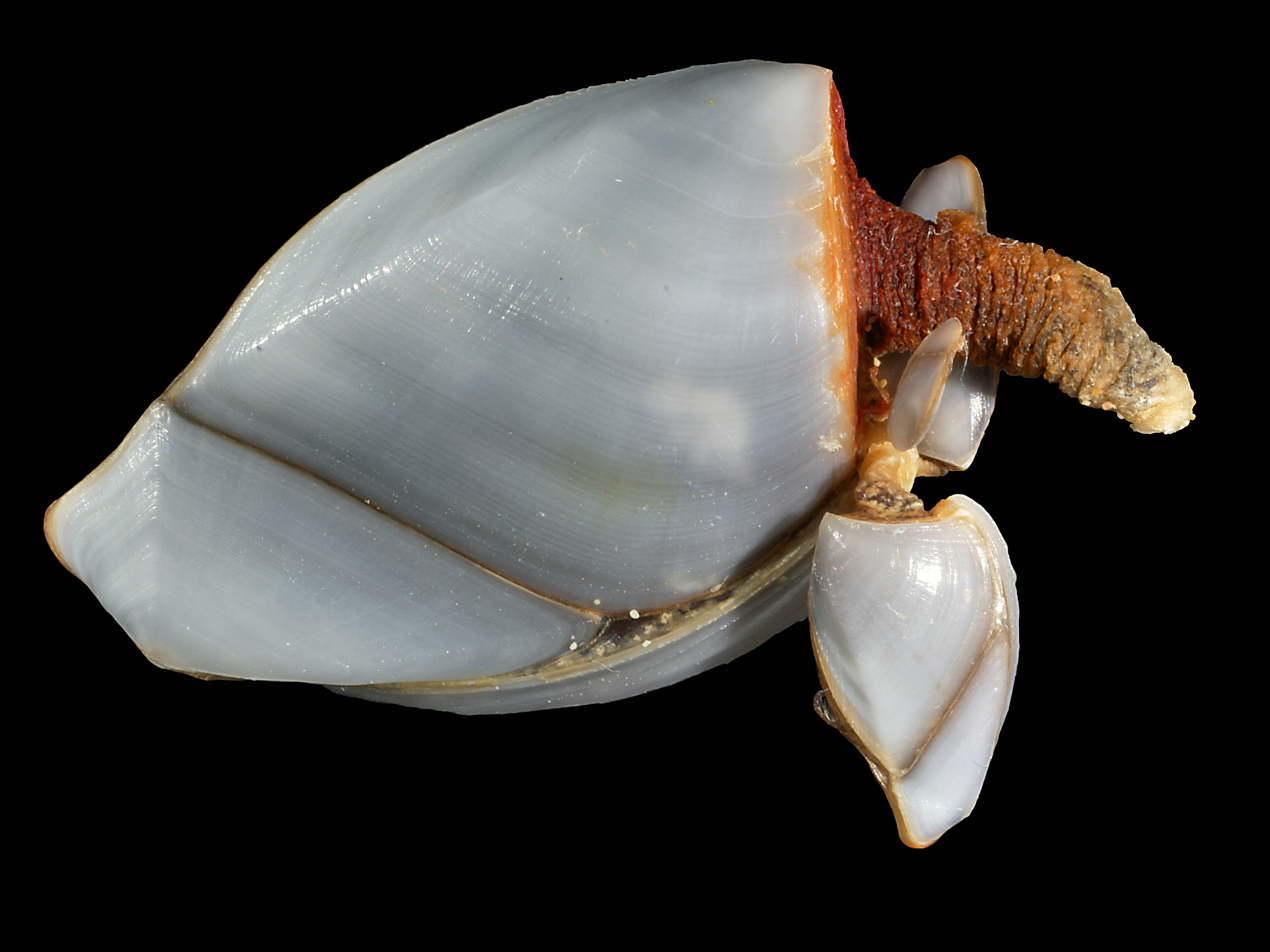
- Lepas anserifera from Crete

Scientific classification
- Kingdom: Animalia
- Phylum: Arthropoda
- Clade: Pancrustacea
- Class: Thecostraca
- Subclass: Cirripedia
- Order: Scalpellomorpha
- Family: Lepadidae
- Genus: Lepas
- Species: L. anserifera

Binomial name
- Lepas anserifera Linnaeus, 1767

= Lepas anserifera =

Species of barnacle

Lepas anserifera is a species of goose barnacle or stalked barnacle in the family Lepadidae. It lives attached to floating timber, ships' hulls and various sorts of flotsam.

== Description ==
Lepas anserifera has a shell or capitulum enclosed in six white plates supported by a tough, flexible, orange stalk or peduncle. The capitulum is about 4 centimetres (1.6 in) long and the stalk a similar length. The limy plates are thick and sculptured and are in close contact with each other. The largest plates, the pair of scuta at the stalk end, are quadrangular with longitudinal furrows and a smooth umbonal area. The pair of terga at the free end are trapezoid and more furrowed than the scutum and the carina in between are wide and forked. The tergal flaps are yellow, giving a coloured rim to the plates in the living animal. The body concealed by these plates consists of a head and thorax with a vestigial abdomen. The head bears the mouthparts consisting of a labrum with fine teeth on the inner margin, a blunt palpus, mandibles and maxillae. The thorax bears three pairs of maxillipeds and cirri with five or six pairs of long feeding appendages. The caudal appendages are curved and pointed which helps distinguish Lepas anserifera from other species.

== Distribution ==
Lepas anserifera has a cosmopolitan distribution being found chiefly in temperate and tropical seas. It is normally found growing in clusters and anchored by its peduncle to driftwood and other floating objects, including whales. It is sometimes found washed up on beaches still attached to this flotsam.

== Biology ==
Lepas anserifera is a hermaphrodite. The life cycle is complex and involves a nauplius and a cyprid larval stage during which the animal is mobile and forms part of the plankton. The larva then settles on a suitable surface before undergoing metamorphosis and becoming a sessile, pedunculate juvenile.

Lepas anserifera is a filter feeder. The feather-like cirri are repeatedly fanned out and then retracted inside the plates to create a current and draw in zooplankton and detritus for consumption.

== Etymology and mythology ==
Before about 1100 AD, the migration of birds was not understood. The brant goose and the barnacle goose winter in Britain, Ireland, and Northwestern Europe, but breed in the far North so that the nests, eggs, and goslings were unknown. Goose barnacles including Lepas anserifera are so called because it was thought at that time that the birds hatched from the goose barnacles found in floating "nests" on the beach.
