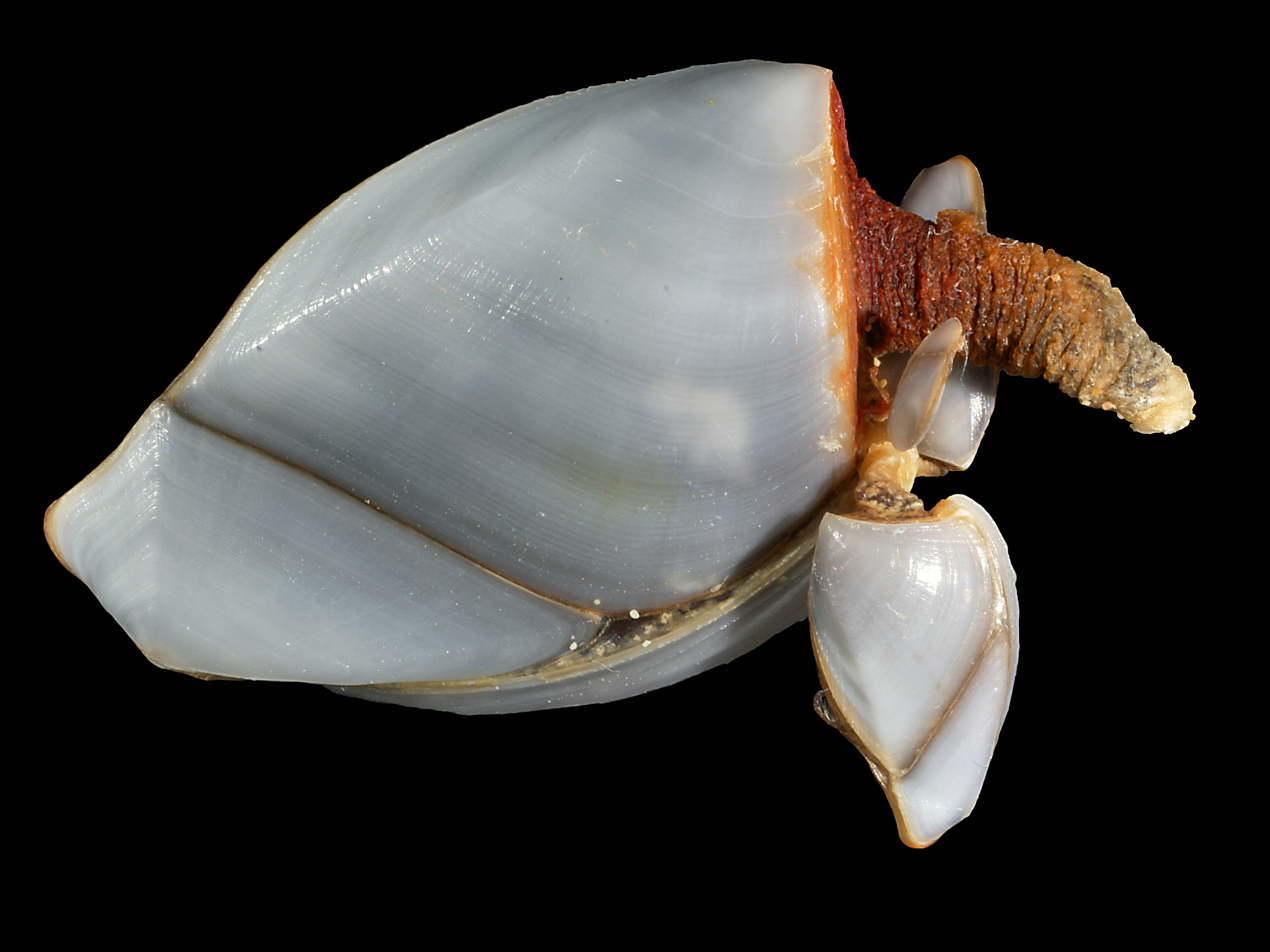
- Lepas anserifera

Scientific classification
- Kingdom: Animalia
- Phylum: Arthropoda
- Clade: Pancrustacea
- Class: Thecostraca
- Subclass: Cirripedia
- Order: Scalpellomorpha
- Superfamily: Lepadoidea
- Family: Lepadidae; Darwin, 1852

= Lepadidae =

Lepadidae Temporal range: Miocene - Present, 23–0 Ma

Family of barnacles

Lepadidae is a family of goose barnacles, erected by Charles Darwin in 1852. There are about five genera and more than 20 described species in Lepadidae.

== Genera ==
These genera belong to the family Lepadidae:

- Conchoderma von Olfers, 1814 (whale barnacles)
- Dosima Gray, 1825
- Hyalolepas Annandale, 1906
- Lepas Linnaeus, 1758 (goose barnacles)
- † Pristinolepas Buckeridge, 1983
