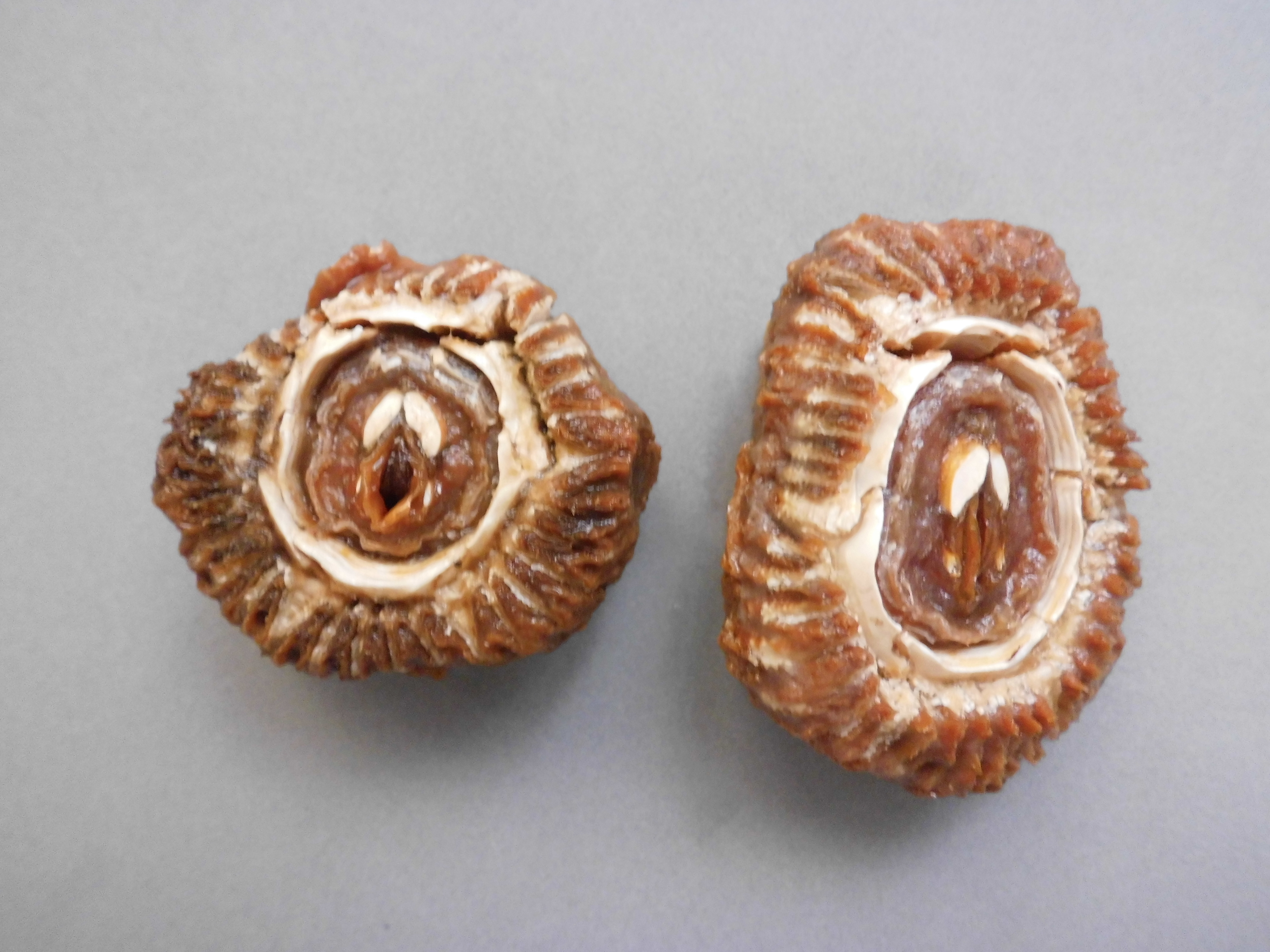
- Cryptolepas rhachianecti

Scientific classification
- Kingdom: Animalia
- Phylum: Arthropoda
- Clade: Pancrustacea
- Class: Thecostraca
- Subclass: Cirripedia
- Order: Balanomorpha
- Superfamily: Coronuloidea
- Family: Coronulidae; Leach, 1817

Genera
- Cetolepas Zullo, 1969; Cetopirus Ranzani, 1817; Chelolepas Ross & Frick, 2007; Coronula Lamarck, 1802; Cryptolepas Dall, 1872; Cylindrolepas Pilsbry, 1916; Platylepas Gray, 1825; Stomatolepas Pilsbry, 1910; Tubicinella Lamarck, 1802; Xenobalanus Steenstrup, 1852; †Emersonius Ross, 1967

= Whale barnacle =

Whale barnacle Temporal range: Late Pliocene–Recent

Barnacles that attach to whales

Whale barnacles are species of acorn barnacle that belong to the family Coronulidae. They typically attach to baleen whales, and sometimes settle on toothed whales. The whale barnacles diverged from the turtle barnacles about three million years ago.

Whale barnacles passively filter food, using tentacle-like cirri, as the host swims through the water. The arrangement is generally considered commensal as it is done at no cost or benefit to the host. However, some whales may make use of the barnacles as protective armor or for inflicting more damage while fighting, which would make the relationship mutualistic where both parties benefit; alternatively, some species may just increase the drag that the host experiences while swimming, making the barnacles parasites.

After hatching, whale barnacles go through six molting stages before searching for a host, being prompted to settle by a chemical cue from the host skin. The barnacle creates a crown-shaped shell, and in most instances, deeply embeds itself into the skin for stability while riding a fast-moving host. The shell plates are made of calcium carbonate and chitin.

Whale barnacles may live for up to a year, and often slough off along migration routes or at whale calving grounds. Because of this, fossil whale barnacles can be used to study ancient whale distribution.

== Taxonomy ==
=== Evolution ===
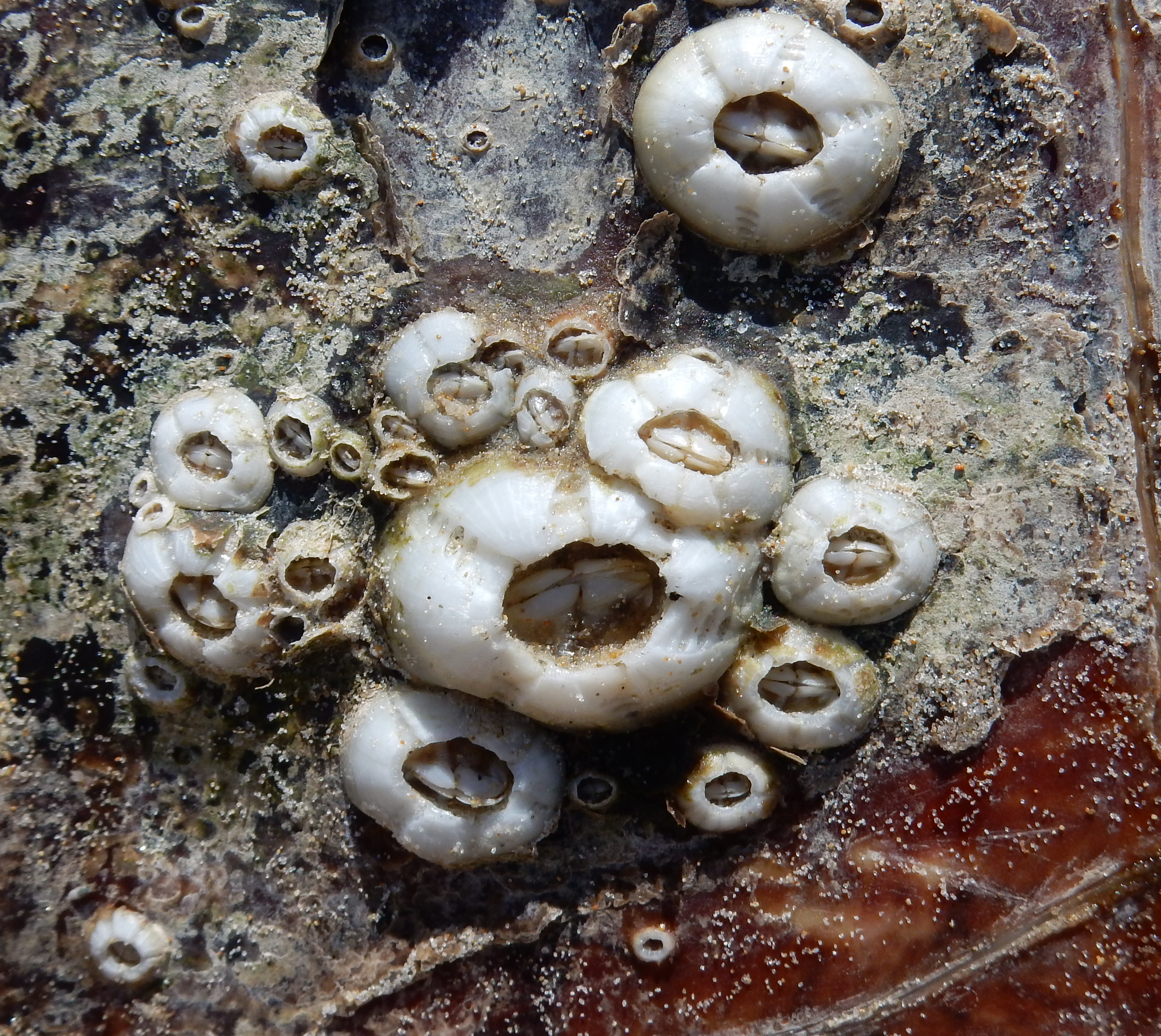
The turtle barnacle Chelonibia testudinaria on a loggerhead sea turtle

Whale barnacles may have originated from the turtle barnacles (Chelonibiidae)—which attach to turtles, sirenians, and crabs—as a group that changed its specialization to baleen whales. Turtle barnacles are known from before the Early Tertiary which ended 23 million years ago (mya), and whale barnacles probably diverged in the Late Pliocene 3.5 to 3 mya. Chelonibia testudinaria turtle barnacle remains from the Pliocene of Italy seemed to have been associated with right whales (Balaena spp.), and could represent a transitional phase; the lack of competing barnacle species and the softer skin compared to the turtle carapace may have led to a divergence and a dispersal. Since whale barnacles are monophyletic (the family contains a common ancestor and all its descendants), this dispersal only successfully occurred once. Since whale barnacles may become detached from their hosts along migration routes and at breeding grounds, their remains on the seabed are used as indicators of ancient whale distribution and migratory habits, similar to the function of trace fossils.

=== Classification ===
Whale barnacles are a family of acorn barnacles. The family Coronulidae was first erected in 1817 by English marine biologist William Elford Leach, and was placed into the order Campylosomata with Balanidae alongside the order Acamptosomata with Cineridea and Pollicipedides, under the superfamily Coronuloidea. In 1825, English zoologist John Edward Gray divided Coronulidae into four subfamilies: Tubicinella, Polylepas, Platylepas, and Astrolepas. In 1854, Charles Darwin reclassified barnacles, and moved all sessile barnacles into the family Balanidae, separating this into the subfamilies Chthamalinae and Balaninae. He was unsure whether to classify whale barnacles into the latter subfamily or follow Leach and Gray and create the subfamily Coronulinae to include sessile barnacles that attach to large vertebrates.

In 1916, biologist Henry Augustus Pilsbry differentiated turtle barnacles from whale barnacles and assigned them to Chelonibiinae and Coronulinae, respectively; he also recognized two forms of Coronulinae, coronulid and platylepadi, based on anatomical differences and host preferences. In 1976, the family Coronulidae was redefined to include Coronulinae, Platylepadinae, Chelonibiinae, and Emersoniinae; Coronuloidea was rearranged to include Coronulidae, Tatraclitidae, and Bathylasmatida. In 1981, Coronulidae was reorganized to include the subfamilies Coronulinae, Chelonibiinae, and Xenobalaninae. In 2007, these were redefined as Coronuloidea comprising three families: Coronulidae, Chelonibiidae, and Platylepadidae. In 2021, a reclassification of the barnacles resulted in the members of Platylepadidae being moved back into Coronulidae, and Coronulidae was no longer grouped into subfamilies.

According to the World Register of Marine Species (WoRMS), there are 35 accepted species of whale barnacles (species in the family Coronulidae), 24 of which exist today. † denotes extinct:

Family Coronulidae Leach, 1817

- Genus Cetolepas Zullo, 1969
  - †Cetolepas hertleini Zullo, 1969
- Genus Cetopirus Ranzani, 1817
  - Cetopirus complanatus Mörch, 1852
  - †Cetopirus fragilis Collareta et al., 2016
- Genus Chelolepas Ross & Frick, 2007
  - Chelolepas cheloniae Monroe & Limpus, 1979
- Genus Coronula Lamarck, 1802
  - Coronula diadema (Linnaeus, 1767)
  - Coronula reginae Darwin, 1854
  - †Coronula aotea Fleming, 1959
  - †Coronula barbara Darwin, 1854
  - †Coronula bifida Bronn, 1831
  - †Coronula dormitor Pilsbry & Olson, 1951
  - †Coronula ficarazzensis Gregorio, 1895
  - †Coronula macsotayi Weisbord, 1971
- Genus Cryptolepas Dall, 1872
  - Cryptolepas rhachianecti Dall, 1872
  - †Cryptolepas murata Zullo, 1961
- Genus Cylindrolepas Pilsbry, 1916
  - Cylindrolepas darwiniana Pilsbry, 1916
  - Cylindrolepas sinica Ren, 1980
- Genus Platylepas Gray, 1825
  - Platylepas coriacea Monroe & Limpus, 1979
  - Platylepas decorata Darwin, 1854
  - Platylepas hexastylos (Fabricius, 1798)
  - Platylepas indicus Daniel, 1958
  - Platylepas krugeri (Krüger, 1912)
  - Platylepas multidecorata Daniel, 1962
  - Platylepas ophiophila Lanchester, 1902
  - Platylepas wilsoni Ross, 1963
  - †Platylepas mediterranea Collareta et al., 2019
- Genus Stomatolepas Pilsbry, 1910
  - Stomatolepas dermochelys Monroe & Limpus, 1979
  - Stomatolepas elegans (Costa, 1838)
  - Stomatolepas muricata Fischer, 1886
  - Stomatolepas pilsbryi Frick, Zardus & Lazo-Wasem, 2010
  - Stomatolepas pulchra Ren, 1980
  - Stomatolepas transversa Nilsson-Cantell, 1930
- Genus Tubicinella Lamarck, 1802
  - Tubicinella cheloniae Monroe & Limpus, 1979
  - Tubicinella major Lamarck, 1802
- Genus Xenobalanus Steenstrup, 1852
  - Xenobalanus globicipitis Steenstrup, 1852
- Genus †Emersonius Ross, 1967
  - †Emersonius cybosyrinx Ross, 1967

The National Center for Biotechnology Information (NCBI) and the Integrated Taxonomic Information System (ITIS) both have different classifications for Coronulidae, though neither are authoritative like WoRMS. NCBI defines Coronulidae as containing Coronula, Cryptolepas, Xenobalanus, and the turtle barnacles Chelonibia; and ITIS Coronula, Cryptolepas, Cetopirus, Xenobalanus, and Polylepas.

== Description ==
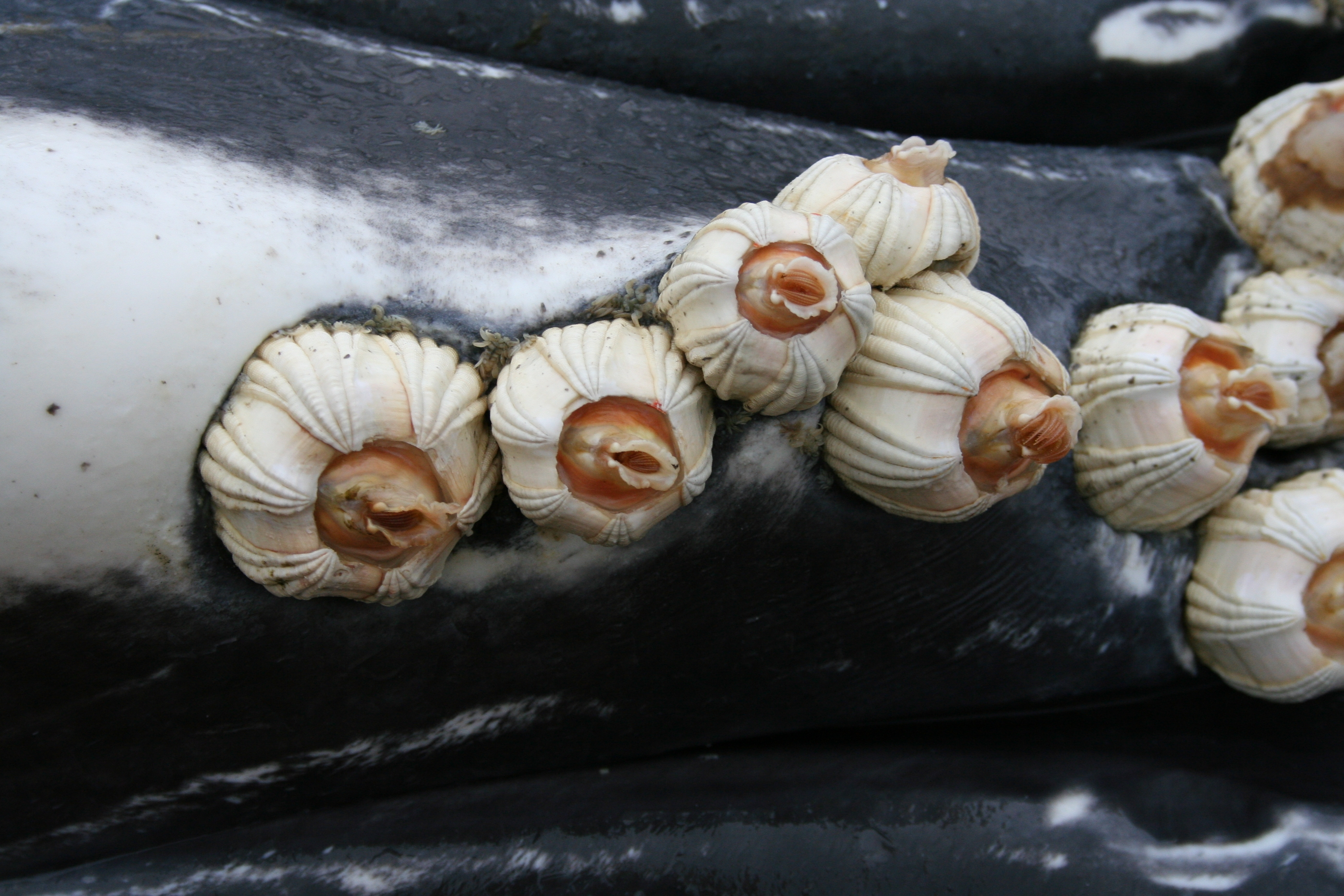
C. diadema on the throat of a humpback whale calf. Whale lice can be seen around the barnacles.

=== Adulthood ===
All acorn barnacles create a crown-shaped shell, with six to eight plates and a hole at the peak. C. diadema is typically barrel-shaped, has most of the shell emergent from the skin, and has been measured in the North Pacific to reach 39–50 millimetres (1.5–2.0 in) in height. Coronula reginae (which is typically 13–19 millimetres (0.51–0.75 in) high), Cetopirus (which has been recorded in two individuals as 12 and 28 millimetres (0.47 and 1.10 in) high and 53 and 74 millimetres (2.1 and 2.9 in) in diameter, respectively), and Cryptolepas are flattened and deeply embedded in the skin. Tubicinella is tall and tube-shaped with ridges that may serve to prevent the skin from rejecting the barnacle; it typically exceeds 50 millimetres (2.0 in) in height. Xenobalanus has a star-shaped shell deeply embedded into the skin, and develops a long stalk (much as goose barnacles do), which hangs off the host; Xenobalanus may be around 30 millimetres (1.2 in) in size.

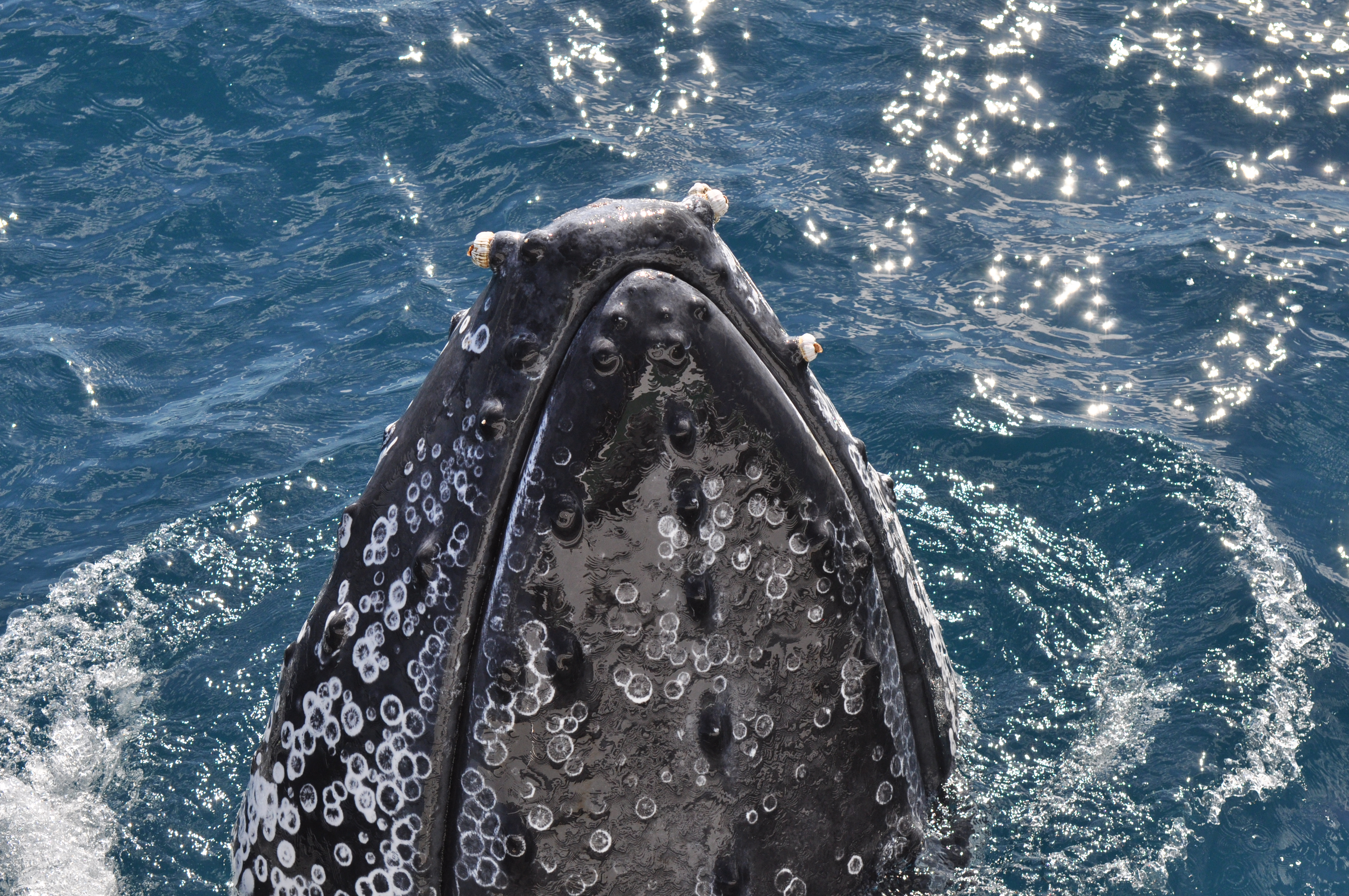
Shed barnacle scars on a humpback whale

The fleshy appendage exiting the hole—the "apertural shroud"—is more prominently displayed than in other barnacles. The cirri, tentacle-like feeding structures that extend out of the aperture, are short and thick, probably enabling them to remain more stable while riding a fast-moving host. Whale barnacles have reduced opercular plates that only partially close the hole at the top, probably because these barnacles lack predators and thus any need to defend themselves. The plates, like those of turtle barnacles, are made of calcium carbonate and chitin. Inside the plates, the soft barnacle itself is encased in a cuticle that is periodically molted. When they are shed from the host, whale barnacles can leave round marks, but Xenobalanus leaves a unique star-shaped scar. C. diadema, based on infestation sizes and the number of juveniles that are present as the year progresses, may have a lifespan of about a year. C. diadema has been observed to slough off in areas with high whale traffic, such as migration routes and breeding areas.

=== Development ===
Unlike coastal acorn barnacles, which have been widely studied, the development of a whale barnacle was first researched in 2006, with Coronula diadema collected from the fin of a beached humpback whale. Immediately after hatching, the newly born nauplius larvae molted and, after six molts, reached the cyprid stage, the last stage before maturity. Unlike other barnacles, the stage II and III nauplius had a pair of horns projecting from the head, and the eyes in stage IV were crescent shaped. The cyprid had circular eyes and, like other barnacles, had several oil cells in the head, which probably acted as food reserves, since cyprids do not feed. The cyprids seemed to be induced to settle onto a substrate by a cue released from whale skin, though they do not have to settle on the skin. Though the mechanism is not fully understood, coastal barnacles receive settling cues from a certain protein, so it may be that whale barnacles use the alpha-2-macroglobulin, a plasma protein of the blood common in vertebrates. After settling, the juvenile barnacles form a ring-shaped structure that firmly grips onto the skin, growing upwards as a cylinder. Wall plates do not form at first, though the juveniles do develop stripes. This cylindrical shape is similar to the adult T. major, which attaches to right whales.

== Ecology ==
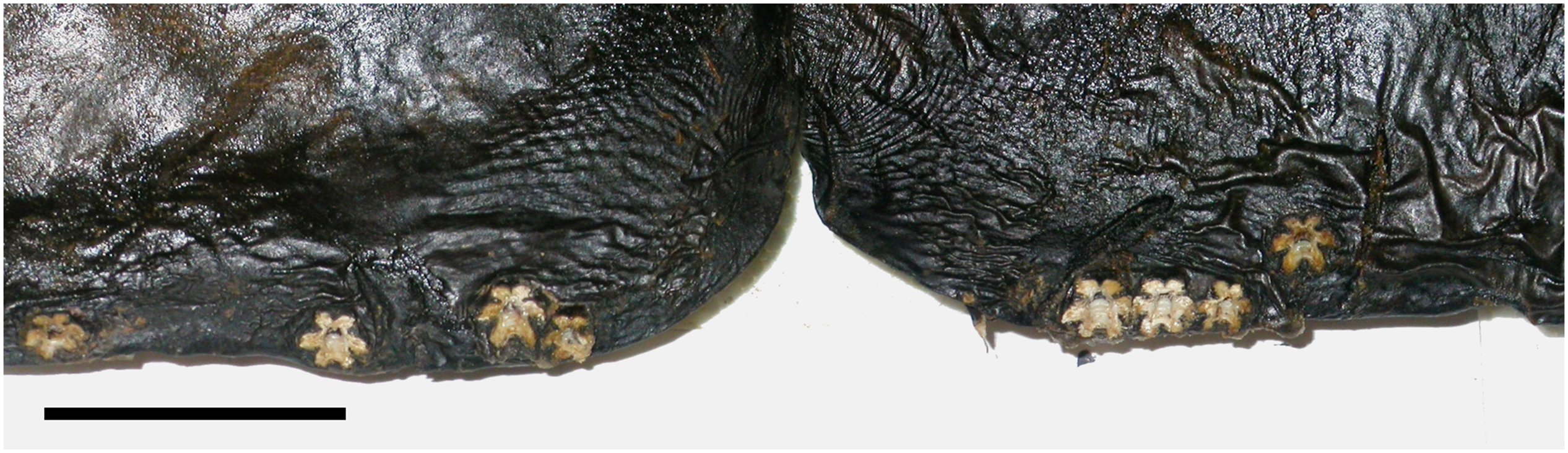
Xenobalanus shells embedded into the flukes of a striped dolphin (Stenella coeruleoalba)

=== Cirri ===
Cirri are used by barnacles to capture food particles in the current. The barnacles extend their cirri into a fan-shape, catch particles, and then retract the cirri back into the shell to transfer the particles into the mouth. First, a membrane—the opercular membrane shielding the barnacle from the water—is opened and the cirri emerge from the shell and are spread. At full extension, three of the six cirri do not protrude past the membrane. The cirri then do a forward stroke, and the long cirri and membrane begin retraction. They do a backward stroke and the cirri roll back up into the shell. In Cryptolepas, this process was observed as taking 1.2 to 1.9 seconds, however the forward and backward strokes can be skipped entirely, and the cirri can simply be extended and quickly coil back up. Adolescent barnacles have shorter cycles than adults. In fast currents, the cirri do not retract. Land-based barnacles have to reorient their cirri depending on the direction of the current; but since the current only flows in one direction for whale barnacles—from the head to the tail of the host—adults have lost that ability. However, the cirri do have a special function during copulation. At this time, the barnacle acting as a male (barnacles are hermaphrodites) fully extends its cirri, and the penis begins a searching movement around its circumference. Having encountered another barnacle, the pair begin a series of intense cirral movements which was observed in Cryptolepas as lasting around 32 seconds.

=== Symbiosis ===
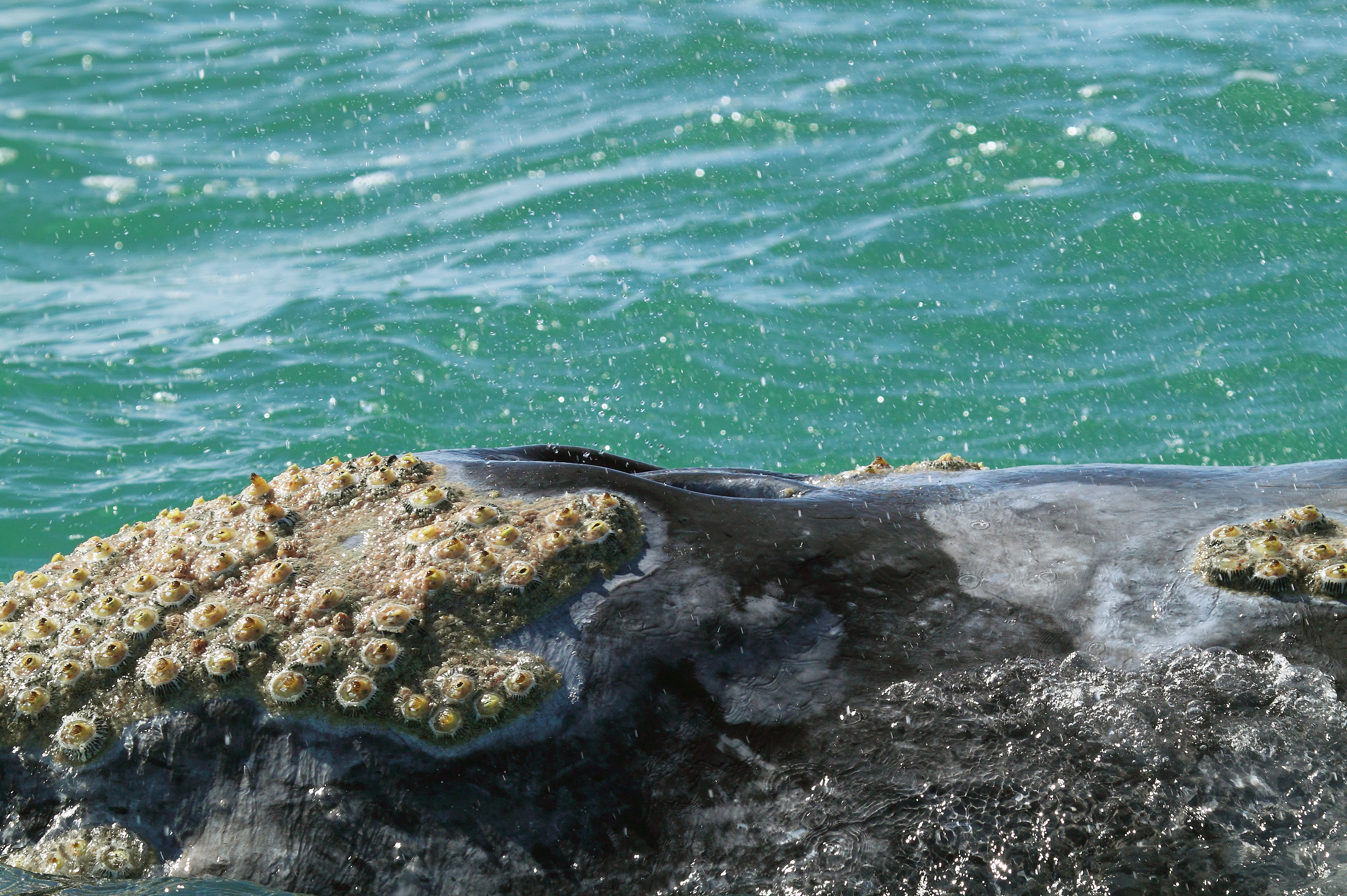
Gray whale rostrum covered in the endemic Cryptolepas rhachianecti barnacles and cyamids often called whale lice

Whale barnacles typically attach to baleen whales and may have a commensal relationship—the barnacle benefits and the whale is neither helped nor harmed; however, as described in the following paragraphs, there are possible advantages and disadvantages to the whale. A single humpback whale may carry up to 450 kg (990 lb) of barnacles.

On right whales (Eubalaena spp) an endemic species of barnacle, Tubicinella is embedded in patches of roughened, calcified skin called callosities. The distribution of callosities and the light colored cyamids that occupy the callosities forms a unique pattern for individual whales, and is used as identity markers by researchers.

Since barnacles require that water flow independently over them to filter food, colonies may follow the direction of water currents produced by the animal in areas with moderate flow. However, Xenobalanus exclusively inhabits the most turbulent environments for barnacles on flippers, flukes, and dorsal fins. Barnacle larvae may reach these sites passively, being deposited naturally by vortexes created by the animal, or may crawl to more suitable locations. Xenobalanus stimulates the growth of calcified skin around itself which prevents the skin from shedding and dislodging the barnacle. On baleen whales, barnacles are often found in conjuncture with whale lice. The goose barnacle Conchoderma auritum often attaches to the shell of C. diadema.

Though whale barnacles are generally considered to be commensals, callosities could be an adaptation to prevent barnacles from adding to drag by concentrating infestations, and a heavy infestation may lead to eczema. Xenobalanus can more easily grow on sick skin with a weakened immune system, and younger individuals tend to have larger infestations presumably because they are less resistant; further, given it has a stalk, it increases the drag felt by the host and may be considered parasitic in that sense. A Cryptolepas infection on captive beluga whales (Delphinapterus leucas) elicited an immune response by the skin, and the barnacles were ejected after a few weeks. Gray whales have been observed rubbing against the gravelly seafloor to dislodge barnacles.

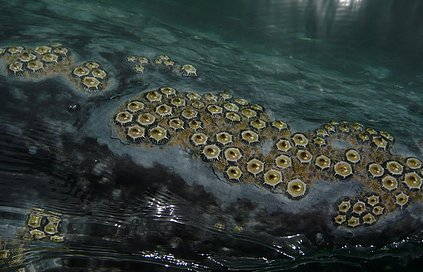
Coronula on a gray whale

Conversely, some whales may use barnacles as weapons or protective armor to add power to a strike in mating battles or as a deterrent to being bitten by orcas (Orcinus orca). This would make the relationship between whale barnacles and certain whales mutualistic in which both parties benefit. It may be that some baleen whales, in the context of the fight-or-flight response, are adapted for a fight response, namely the humpback and gray (Eschricthius robustus) whales. As such they may have evolved to attract barnacles, sacrificing speed for damage and defense. Others, the Balaenoptera, are adapted for a flight response, probably evolving an antifouling mechanism in their skin to deter infestations, avoiding unnecessary weight which would hinder speed. However, the bowhead whale (Balaena mysticetus), the North Atlantic (Eubalaena glacialis), and North Pacific (E. japonica) right whales, which favor fight responses, are generally barnacle-free. It may be that a reduction in population caused by historic whaling restricted their distribution and contact with other whales, thus impeding the barnacles' ability to infect other whales.

=== Hosts ===
Dolphins swimming with Xenobalanus on their tail fins

C. diadema are common to abundant on the humpback whale (Megaptera novaengliae), and uncommon to rare on other species of whale. Cryptolepas is abundant on the gray whale, but has been recorded on the orca, the beluga whale, and in the stomach of the topsmelt silverside (Atherinops affinis). Topsmelt are known to pick off the dead skin and whale lice often found in association with barnacles. Tubicinella major has been recorded only on the southern right whale.

Cetopirus complanatus inhabits exclusively the southern right whale Eubalaena australis. Xenobalanus has been recorded on: the pilot whales (Globicephala spp.), common bottlenose dolphin (Tursiops truncatus), Indo-Pacific bottlenose dolphin (T. aduncus), pantropical spotted dolphin (Stenella attenuata), striped dolphin, spinner dolphin (S. longirostris), Cuvier's beaked whale (Ziphius cavirostris), franciscana (Pontoporia blainvillei), orca, false killer whale (Pseudorca crassidens), tucuxi (Sotalia fluviatilis), rough-toothed dolphin (Steno bredanensis), Risso's dolphin (Grampus griseus), pygmy killer whale (Feresa attenuata), common dolphins (Delphinus spp.), dusky dolphin (Lagenorhynchus obscurus), melon-headed whale (Peponocephala electra), sperm whale, finless porpoise (Neophocaena phocaenoides), harbor porpoise (Phocoena phocoena), vaquita (P. sinus), Burmeister's porpoise (P. spinipinnis), True's beaked whale (Mesoplodon mirus), common minke whale, sei whale, Eden's whale (B. edeni), blue whale, fin whale, and humpback whale.

== See also ==
- Whale louse
