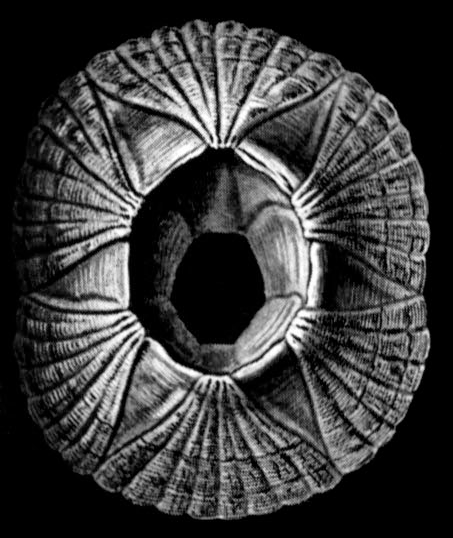
- Illustration of Coronula reginae by Ernst Haeckel (19th century)

Scientific classification
- Kingdom: Animalia
- Phylum: Arthropoda
- Clade: Pancrustacea
- Class: Thecostraca
- Subclass: Cirripedia
- Order: Balanomorpha
- Family: Coronulidae
- Genus: Coronula
- Species: C. reginae

Binomial name
- Coronula reginae Darwin, 1854

= Coronula reginae =

Species of barnacle

Coronula reginae is a species of acorn barnacle in the family Coronulidae that lives as an epibiont on marine mammals, particularly baleen whales. This species was first described by Charles Darwin in 1854 and is most commonly associated with humpback whales (Megaptera novaeangliae), although it has also been recorded on other whale species, including right whales and more rarely, blue, fin, minke, and sei whales.

== Description ==
Coronula reginae is characterized by a flattened, globose shell, reaching a diameter of 50–85 mm. This species of barnacle has a striated shell surface with crenate margins and a hexagonal operculum. Like other Coronuliid barnacles, Coronula reginae is white, radially symmetrical, and has a yellow opercular membrane. The radii are thin and do not exceed one-fifth of the thickness of an internal compartment wall, and the terga are absent.

The species can be distinguished from related barnacles such as Coronula diadema. Compared to Coronula diadema, which reaches an exposed height of 30–59 mm, Coronula reginae is shorter in height, with only 13–19 mm exposed above its host’s epidermal tissues, embedding more deeply into the host’s skin. In contrast, Coronula diadema has a more barrel-shaped shell that protrudes more prominently above the surface of the host’s skin. Coronula reginae also differs from Cryptolepas rhachianecti, the gray whale barnacle, which has a flatter shell with exposed spaces between radiating ridges and a more striped appearance due to darker ridges that are not covered by the host’s skin.

== Ecology and host associations ==
Coronula reginae is an obligate, commensal epibiont that attaches to whales during its larval (cyprid) stage using cement glands. Although it lives on whale skin, it is not considered a true parasite, as it does not feed on host tissues or body fluids. However, heavy infestations may increase hydrodynamic drag.

The species most commonly occurs on humpback whales (Megaptera novaeangliae), and is most frequently documented on the lips, flippers, ventral grooves, and other protruding body parts. It is also frequently found in association with Coronula diadema, often forming mixed aggregations.

On North Pacific right whales (Eubalaena japonica), Coronula reginae has been documented on the flukes and rostrum, where it leaves characteristic indentations and scarring after detachment. This differs from Coronula diadema, which is more often restricted to areas near the blowholes. In more rare instances (8.7%), Coronula reginae will recruit across the skin of Antarctic minke whales (Balaenoptera bonaerensis), suggesting a geographic overlap between Antarctic minke whales and humpback whales in the region where Coronula reginae spawns and recruits.

Barnacle loss is thought to be influenced by whale skin molting or environmental factors such as temperature increases during southern migration, with warmer waters also inducing reproduction in Coronulareginae and other Coronuliids. Larger individuals may detach in warmer waters and be replaced by rapidly growing juveniles.

The shell of Coronula reginae can serve as a substrate for other epibiotic organisms, including species of stalked barnacles such as Conchoderma autitum and Conchoderma virgatum.

== Distribution ==
Coronula reginae is most abundant in the North Pacific and North Atlantic Oceans, although records also exist from the Caribbean Sea, North Sea, Southern Ocean.

The species has also been documented historically in Japanese waters and in the fossil record, in addition to specimens associated with humpback whales in British Columbia.

Observations suggest regional differences in abundance. Coronulareginae is relatively more common than Coronula diadema in the Pacific Ocean, but relatively less abundant in the Atlantic.

== Paleontological record ==
In the fossil record, Coronula reginae can be identified by the distinctive T-shaped cross-section of its shell. Fossil specimens have been found in association with humpback whales in Japan and at the Cachalot Whaling Station on Vancouver Island, Canada.
