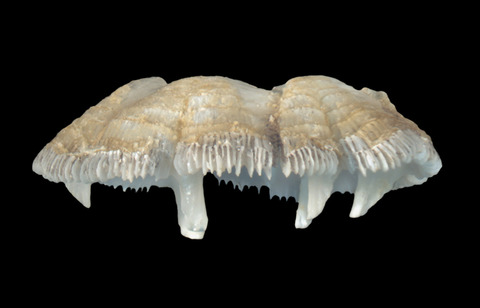

Scientific classification
- Kingdom: Animalia
- Phylum: Arthropoda
- Clade: Pancrustacea
- Class: Thecostraca
- Subclass: Cirripedia
- Order: Balanomorpha
- Family: Coronulidae
- Genus: Platylepas
- Species: P. hexastylos

Binomial name
- Platylepas hexastylos (Fabricius, 1798)

= Platylepas hexastylos =

Species of barnacle

Platylepas hexastylos is a species of barnacle in the family Platylepadidae. It is native to the Indo-Pacific Ocean where it lives as a symbiont of such large marine creatures as the dugong (Dugong dugon), the green sea turtle (Chelonia mydas), the olive ridley sea turtle (Lepidochelys olivacea), or the loggerhead sea turtle (Caretta caretta).

== Ecology ==
Some species of barnacle settle on either a solid substrate or on a living host, but others are obligate commensals, and this latter group includes P. hexastylos. In a study of stranded turtles on the coast of southern Brazil, P. hexastylos and Chelonibia testudinaria were the barnacles most often encountered. Some turtles had as many as three species of barnacle, and P. hexastylos was often associated with the bay barnacle (Balanus improvisus). In general the barnacles were encrusted on the marginal scutes or the rear of the turtle, but P. hexastylos encrusted securely on soft tissues causing deep wounds. Up to eight P. hexastylos were found on individual turtles.
