= Platylepas ophiophila =

Scientific classification
- Kingdom: Animalia
- Phylum: Arthropoda
- Clade: Pancrustacea
- Class: Thecostraca
- Subclass: Cirripedia
- Order: Balanomorpha
- Family: Coronulidae
- Genus: Platylepas
- Species: P. ophiophila

Binomial name
- Platylepas ophiophila Lanchester, 1902

Synonyms
- Platylepas ophiophilus Lanchester, 1902

Species of barnacle

Platylepas ophiophila, commonly known as the sea snake barnacle, is a species of barnacle in the family Platylepadidae. It is native to the Indo-Pacific Ocean where it lives as a epibiont of a sea snake.

== Ecology ==
Platylepas ophiophila is found living in association with several species of sea snake as an ectosymbiont. The barnacle adheres to the snake's skin, and has ribs that penetrate the snake's skin to make the attachment more secure. Nevertheless, the barnacle usually becomes detached when the snake sheds its skin. Barnacles breed by internal fertilisation, so individuals of this species have to be located adjacent to another individual in order to reproduce. Despite the fact that sea snakes are mobile and generally solitary, about half the sea snakes support barnacles. The barnacle may have adopted this lifestyle as a result of intense competition for space on coral reefs, rocks and other hard substrates; the advantages for the barnacle are freedom from predators, freedom from competitors, mobility, a feeding current, and possibly food fragments discarded by its host. There is no discernible benefit to this relationship for the sea snake and the barnacles increase drag in the water, impeding swimming. Snakes may engage in behaviors intended to dislodge the barnacles, such as rubbing against rocks for coastal species or knotting for open water species,

This species of barnacle is short-lived because it dies when the sea snake sheds its skin; as the skin is sloughed every four to six weeks, it is presumed that the barnacle completes its life cycle within this period. When fixed to the spine-bellied sea snake (Lapemis hardwickii) the output of eggs is relatively small, and this may be an adaptation to the mode of life of its host. Another barnacle, Octolasmis warwickii adheres to the slipper lobster (Thenus orientalis); it also dies when its host sheds its skin, but it has a much larger output of eggs.
