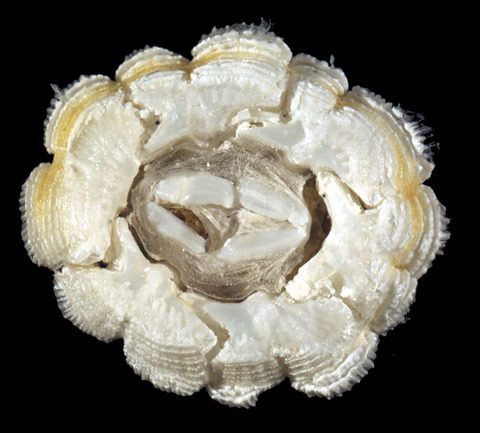
- Preserved specimen of Platylepas hexastylos

Scientific classification
- Kingdom: Animalia
- Phylum: Arthropoda
- Clade: Pancrustacea
- Class: Thecostraca
- Subclass: Cirripedia
- Order: Balanomorpha
- Family: Coronulidae
- Genus: Platylepas; Gray, 1825

= Platylepas =

Genus of barnacles

Platylepas is a genus of barnacles in the family Platylepadidae of the subphylum Crustacea.

== Species ==
Species within the genus Platylepas recognised by the World Register of Marine Species include:

- Platylepas coriacea Monroe & Limpus, 1979
- Platylepas decorata Darwin, 1854
- Platylepas hexastylos (Fabricius, 1798)
- Platylepas indicus Daniel, 1958
- Platylepas krugeri (Krüger, 1912)
- Platylepas multidecorata Daniel, 1962
- Platylepas ophiophila Lanchester, 1902
- Platylepas wilsoni Ross, 1963
- † Platylepas mediterranea Collareta et al., 2019
