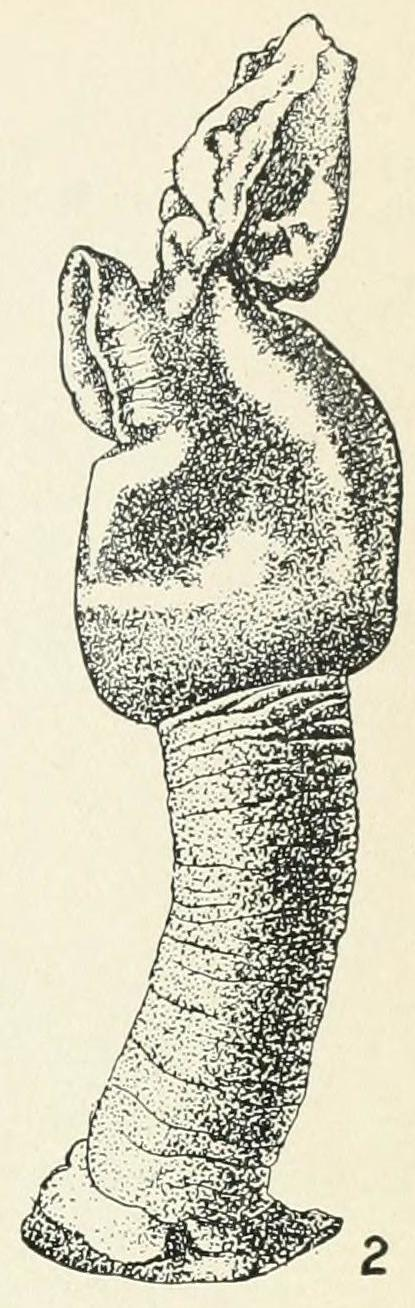
- Illustration of Conchoderma auritum

Scientific classification
- Kingdom: Animalia
- Phylum: Arthropoda
- Clade: Pancrustacea
- Class: Thecostraca
- Subclass: Cirripedia
- Order: Scalpellomorpha
- Family: Lepadidae
- Genus: Conchoderma von Olfers, 1817

Type species
- Lepas aurita Linnaeus, 1767

Species
- Conchoderma auritum (Linnaeus, 1767) (Note: The authority for Conchoderma auritum is correctly "(Linnaeus, 1767)", but is often given as "(Linnaeus, 1758)"; the species dates from the 1767 12th edition of Systema Naturae (as "Lepas aurita"), and does not appear in the 1758 10th edition.); Conchoderma chelonophilum (Leach, 1818); Conchoderma indicum Daniel, 1953; Conchoderma virgatum Spengler, 1789

Synonyms
- cochlea

= Conchoderma =

Genus of barnacles

Conchoderma is a genus of goose barnacles in the family Lepadidae.
