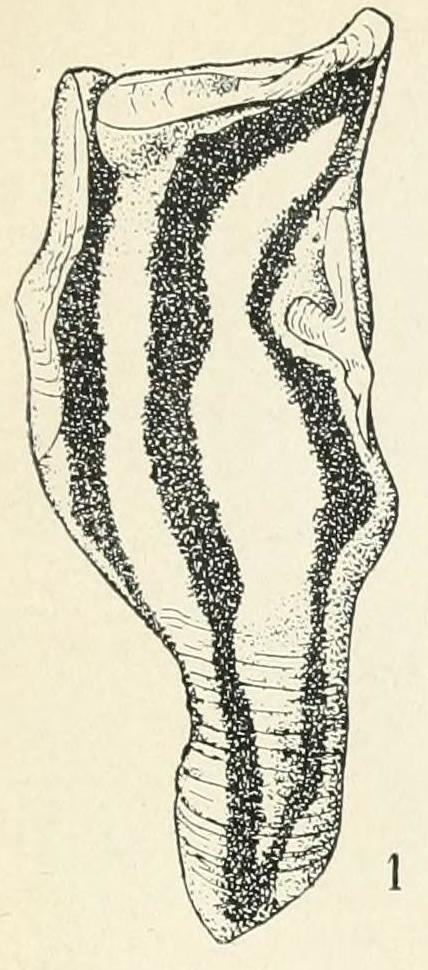
- Illustration of Conchoderma virgatum
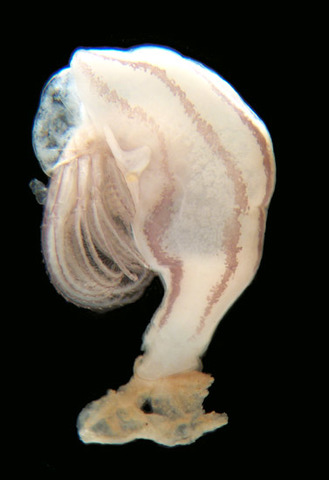

Scientific classification
- Kingdom: Animalia
- Phylum: Arthropoda
- Class: Thecostraca
- Subclass: Cirripedia
- Order: Scalpellomorpha
- Family: Lepadidae
- Genus: Conchoderma
- Species: C. virgatum

Binomial name
- Conchoderma virgatum Spengler, 1789

Synonyms
- Conchoderma hunteri (Owen, 1830); Conchoderma virgata (Spengler, 1790); Lepas virgata Spengler, 1790

= Conchoderma virgatum =

Species of crustacean

Conchoderma virgatum is a species of goose barnacle in the family Lepadidae. It is a pelagic species found in open water in most of the world's oceans attached to drifting objects or marine organisms.

== Description ==
Conchoderma virgatum has a flexible, flattened, scale-less peduncle (stalk) which is attached to a solid surface, and a capitulum (body) with five smooth, four-sided plates, widely separated from each other and not clearly demarcated from the peduncle. The total length of this goose barnacle is about 70 mm (2.8 in), half of which is the peduncle. Overall, the colour is grey, but there are some dark purplish-brown longitudinal streaks.

== Distribution ==
Conchoderma virgatum has a cosmopolitan distribution, being found in all the world's oceans attached to a wide range of drifting and swimming objects, as well as benthic habitats.

== Ecology ==
Conchoderma virgatum is found attached to a wider range of floating objects and nekton than goose barnacles in the genus Lepas. This species seems to have evolved from the same common ancestry as Conchoderma auritum, which occurs on whales, and Alepas which occur on jellyfish. Most attachments are to inanimate objects such as buoys and the hulls of ships, but it has been recorded as being attached to seaweed, crabs, sea snakes, turtles and whales, and at least thirteen species of fish. Direct attachment to fish is infrequent, perhaps because of the mucus produced by the skin; in one example, four of the barnacles were attached to a single spine of a spot-fin porcupinefish (Diodon hystrix). This barnacle also attaches to several species of parasitic copepods, and on one occasion was observed attached to an isopod that was parasitic on an orange filefish (Aluterus schoepfii).

Like most barnacles, Conchoderma virgatum is a filter feeder. A number of modified legs known as "cirri" can be extended into the water column. These feathery appendages beat rhythmically and catch plankton and small organic particles, drawing them into the mouth.
