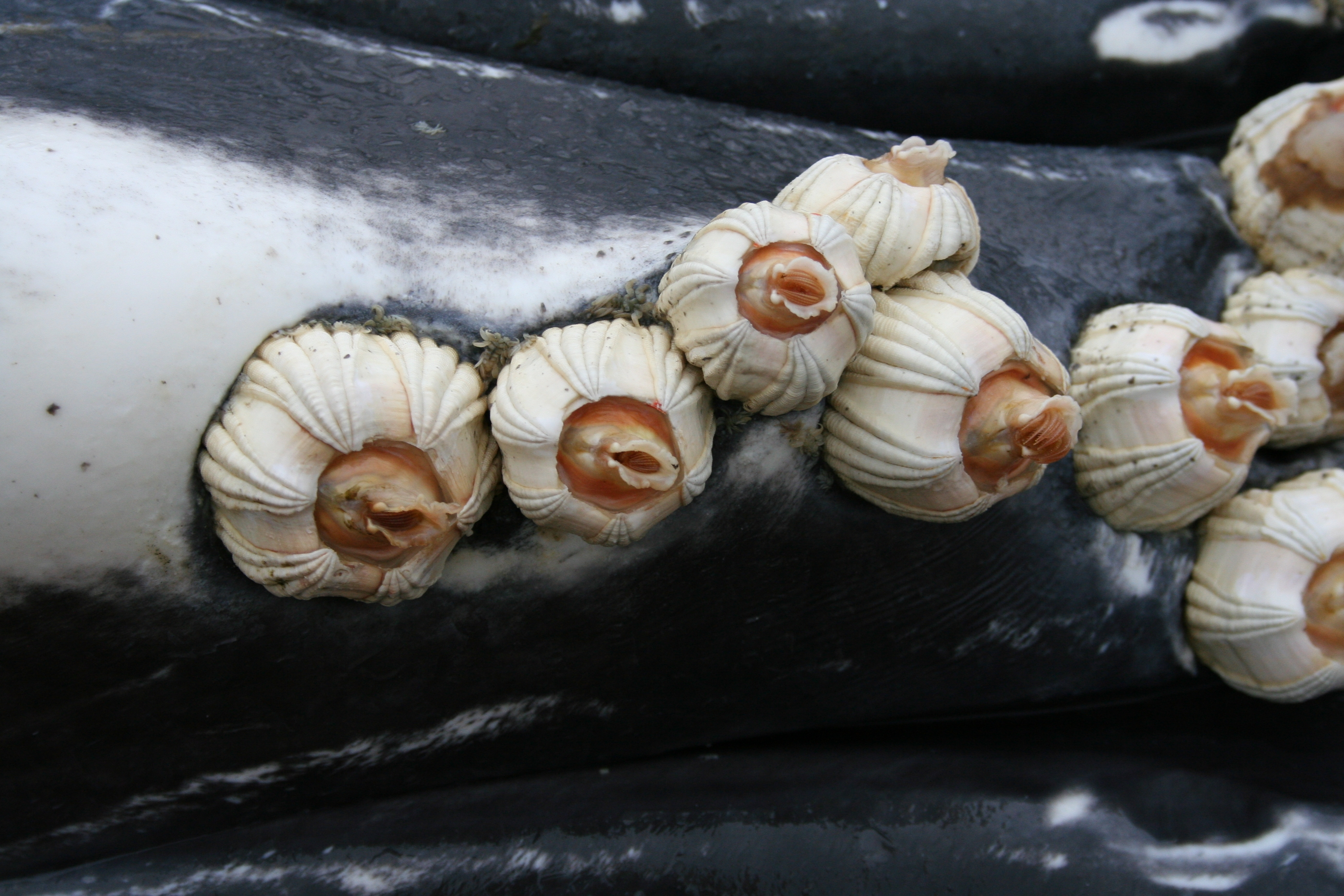
- Coronula diadema on a humpback whale

Scientific classification
- Kingdom: Animalia
- Phylum: Arthropoda
- Class: Thecostraca
- Subclass: Cirripedia
- Order: Balanomorpha
- Family: Coronulidae
- Genus: Coronula; Lamarck, 1802

= Coronula =

Genus of barnacles

Coronula is a genus of whale barnacles, containing the following species (those known only from the fossil record are marked '†'):

- Coronula aotea Fleming, 1959 †
- Coronula barbara Darwin, 1854 †
- Coronula bifida Bronn, 1831 †
- Coronula diadema (Linnaeus, 1767)
- Coronula dormitor Pilsbry & Olson, 1951 †
- Coronula ficarazzensis Gregorio, 1895 †
- Coronula macsotayi Weisbord, 1971 †
- Coronula reginae Darwin, 1854
