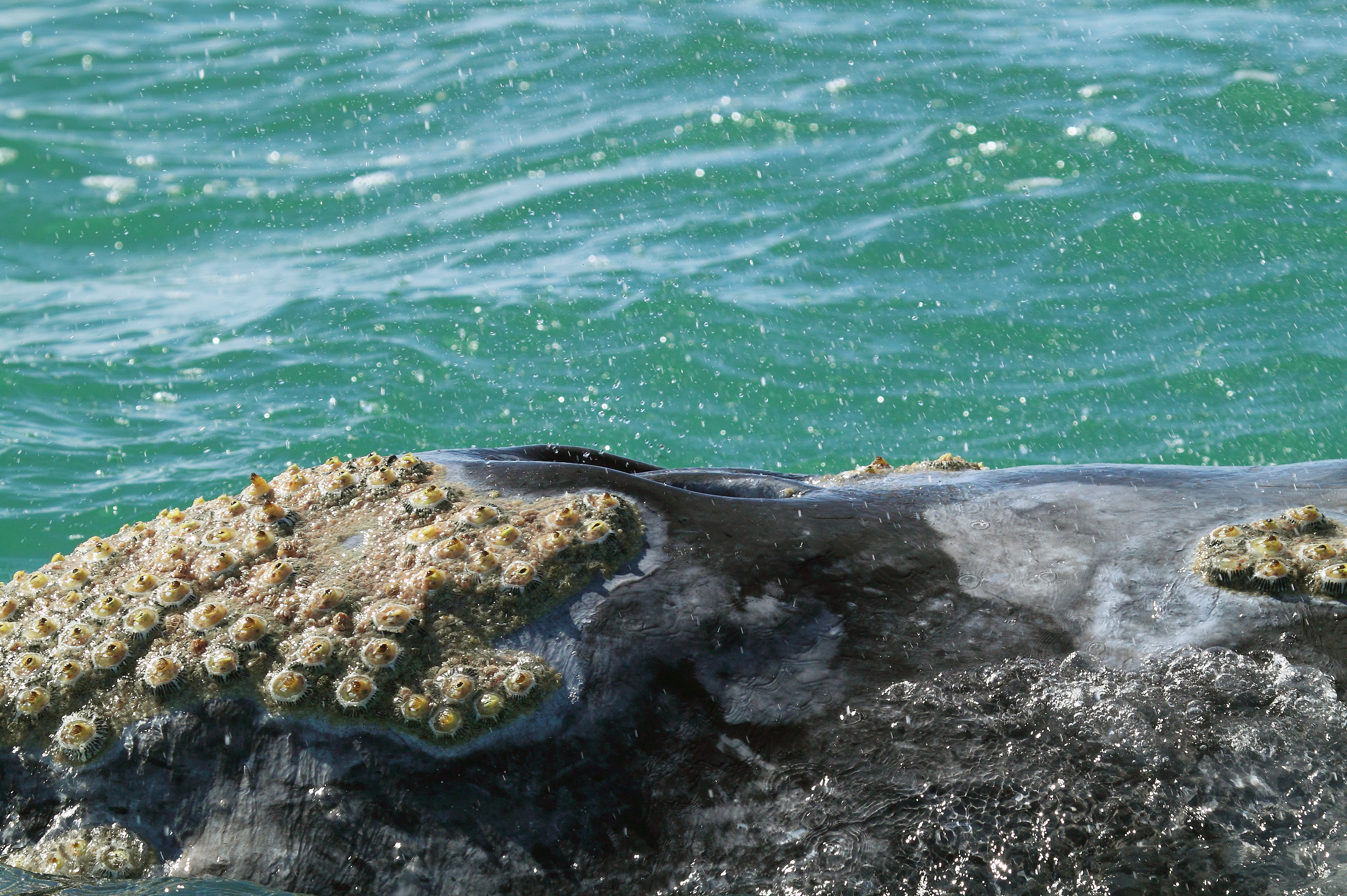
- Cryptolepas rhachianecti on a Baja California gray whale

Scientific classification
- Kingdom: Animalia
- Phylum: Arthropoda
- Class: Thecostraca
- Subclass: Cirripedia
- Order: Balanomorpha
- Family: Coronulidae
- Genus: Cryptolepas; Dall, 1872

= Cryptolepas =

Genus of crustaceans

Cryptolepas is a genus of whale barnacles in the family Coronulidae. There are two described species in Cryptolepas, one of which is extinct.

== Species ==
These species belong to the genus Cryptolepas:

- Cryptolepas rhachianecti Dall, 1872
- † Cryptolepas murata Zullo, 1961
