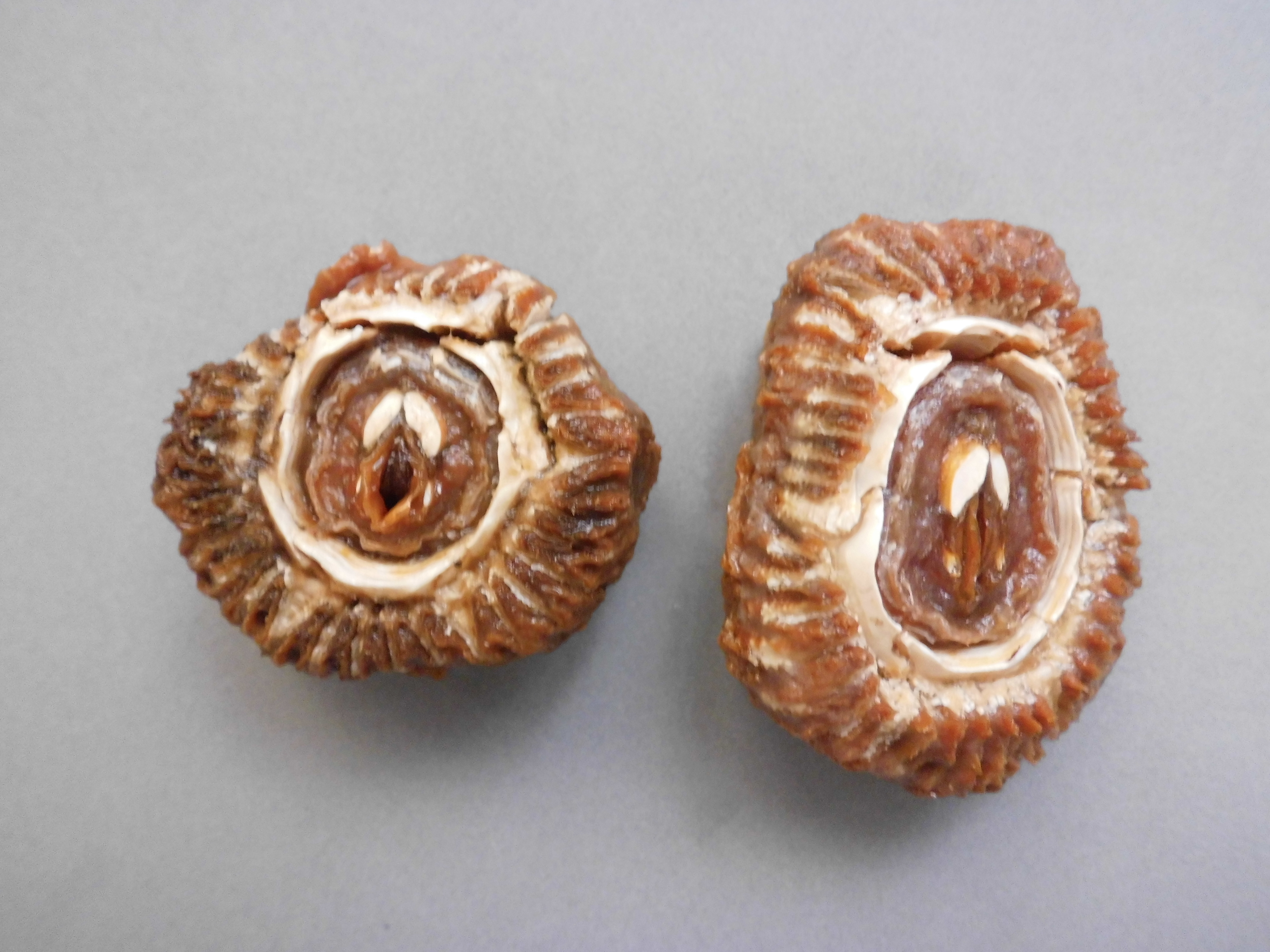

Scientific classification
- Domain: Eukaryota
- Kingdom: Animalia
- Phylum: Arthropoda
- Class: Thecostraca
- Subclass: Cirripedia
- Order: Balanomorpha
- Family: Coronulidae
- Genus: Cryptolepas
- Species: C. rhachianecti

Binomial name
- Cryptolepas rhachianecti Dall, 1872

= Cryptolepas rhachianecti =

Species of whale barnacle

Cryptolepas rhachianecti is a species of whale barnacle that lives as a passenger on the skin of gray whales and certain other species of whale in the northern Pacific Ocean.

== Description ==
Cryptolepas rhachianecti can grow to a diameter of 3.8 cm (1.5 in).

== Distribution ==
The species is now only known from the northern Pacific Ocean where gray whales are found. The gray whale was present in the northern Atlantic Ocean between the Late Pleistocene and recent times, and C. rhachianecti fossils have been found on a beach in the Netherlands, showing that the barnacle must also have been present. This barnacle has been found between January and March for several years in captive beluga whales in San Diego Bay, near a route used by migratory gray whales. The barnacles have evoked a skin reaction in the beluga whales resulting in the eviction of the barnacles, which suggests an immune response.

== Ecology ==
This barnacle is found attached exclusively to the skin of whales, almost always to the gray whale (Eschrichtius robustus), but occasionally it has been found on the killer whale (Orcinus orca) and the beluga whale (Delphinapterus leucas). On the gray whale, the barnacles embed themselves deeply in the skin and are mostly clustered on the animal's head and back. Crawling among the barnacles and taking advantage of the protection they provide are several species of ectoparasitic crustaceans known as whale lice, including the gray whale louse Cyamus scammoni and the generalist whale lice Cyamus ceti and Cyamus kessleri. So common are these that an adult gray whale may be carrying several hundred pounds weight of barnacles and lice. Gray whales have been observed rubbing their bodies against pebbly seabeds in an apparent effort to rid themselves of attached organisms.
