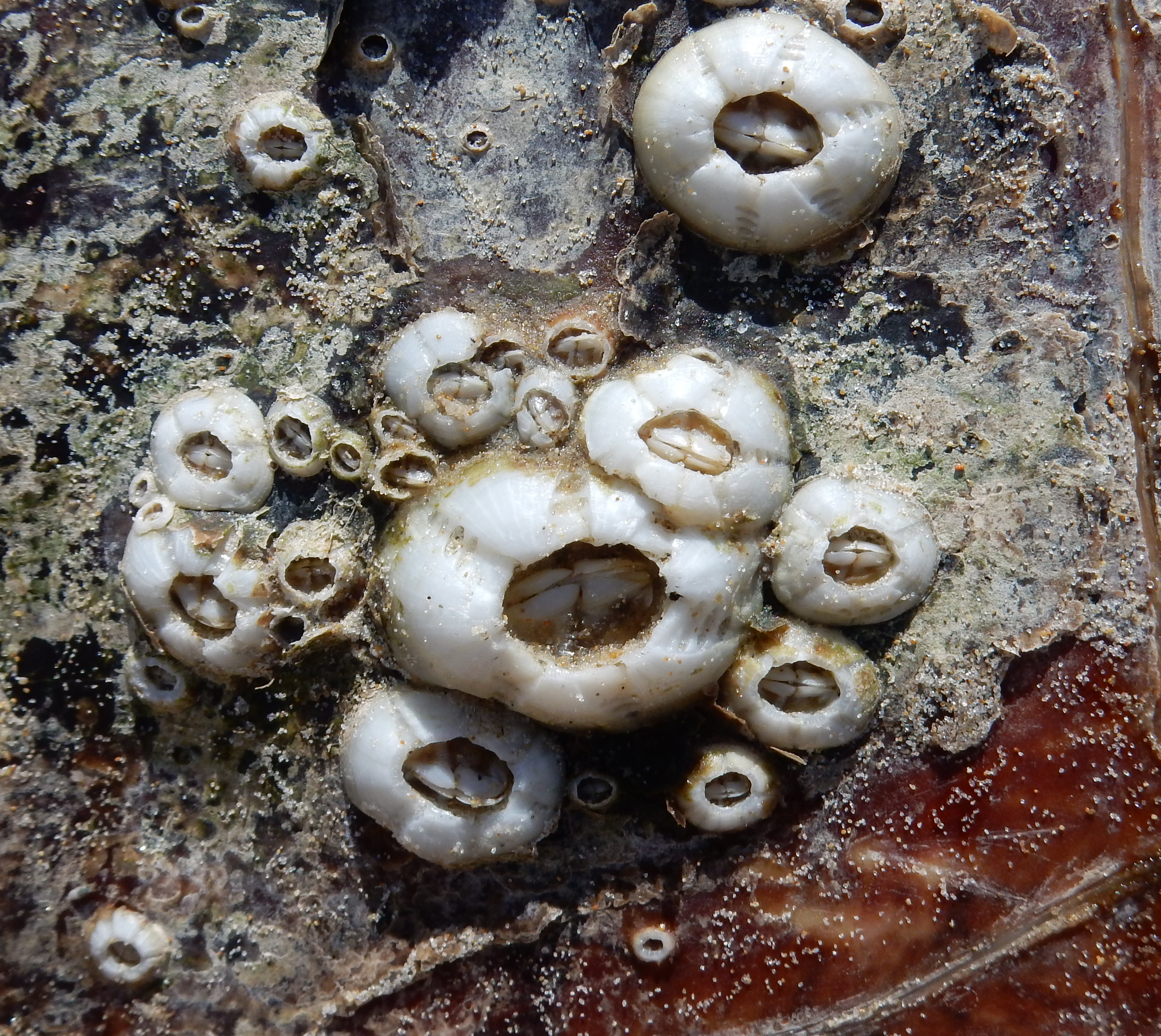

Scientific classification
- Kingdom: Animalia
- Phylum: Arthropoda
- Clade: Pancrustacea
- Class: Thecostraca
- Subclass: Cirripedia
- Order: Balanomorpha
- Family: Chelonibiidae
- Genus: Chelonibia
- Species: C. testudinaria

Binomial name
- Chelonibia testudinaria (Linnaeus, 1758)

Synonyms
- Chelonibia manati Gruvel, 1903; Chelonibia patula (Ranzani, 1818)

= Chelonibia testudinaria =

Species of barnacle

Chelonibia testudinaria is a species of barnacle in the family Chelonibiidae. It is native to the Atlantic Ocean, Mediterranean Sea and Gulf of Mexico where it lives as a symbiont on sea turtles, being particularly abundant on the loggerhead sea turtle.

== Taxonomy ==
Historically, the genus Chelonibia contained C. testudinaria, found growing only on sea turtles, and C. patula, a generalist found growing on a range of living hosts including decapods, gastropods, mantis shrimps and sea snakes, but very rarely on sea turtles. It was puzzling why a barnacle that was adaptable to such a broad range of hosts, should avoid the sea turtle. The two are distinguished morphologically as well as by host, and were thought to be different species. However, examination of the genetic differences between the pair showed that they are in fact con-specific.

== Description ==
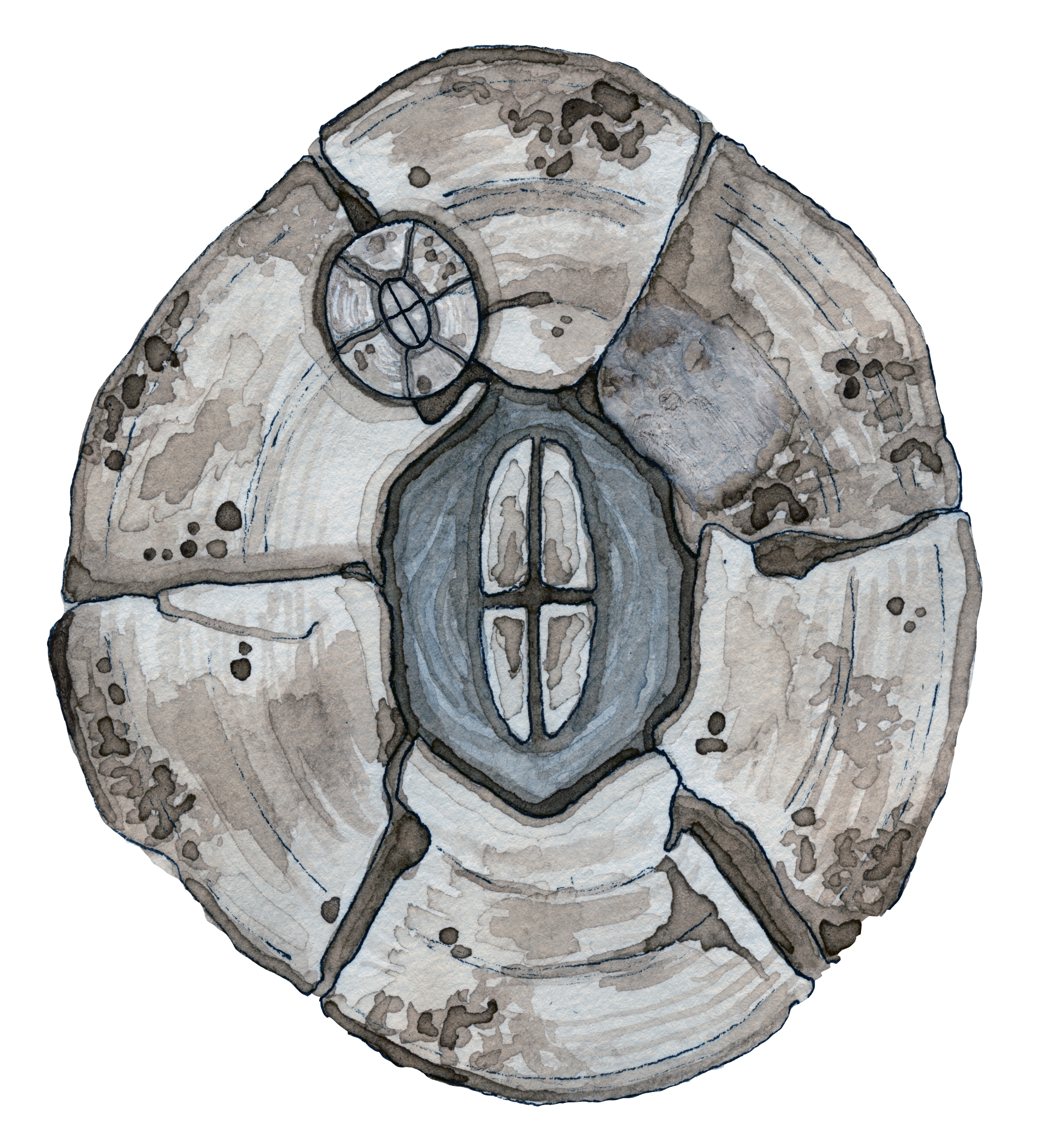
Chelonibia testudinaria top view, hermaphrodite with male attached, by Melissa Merrill

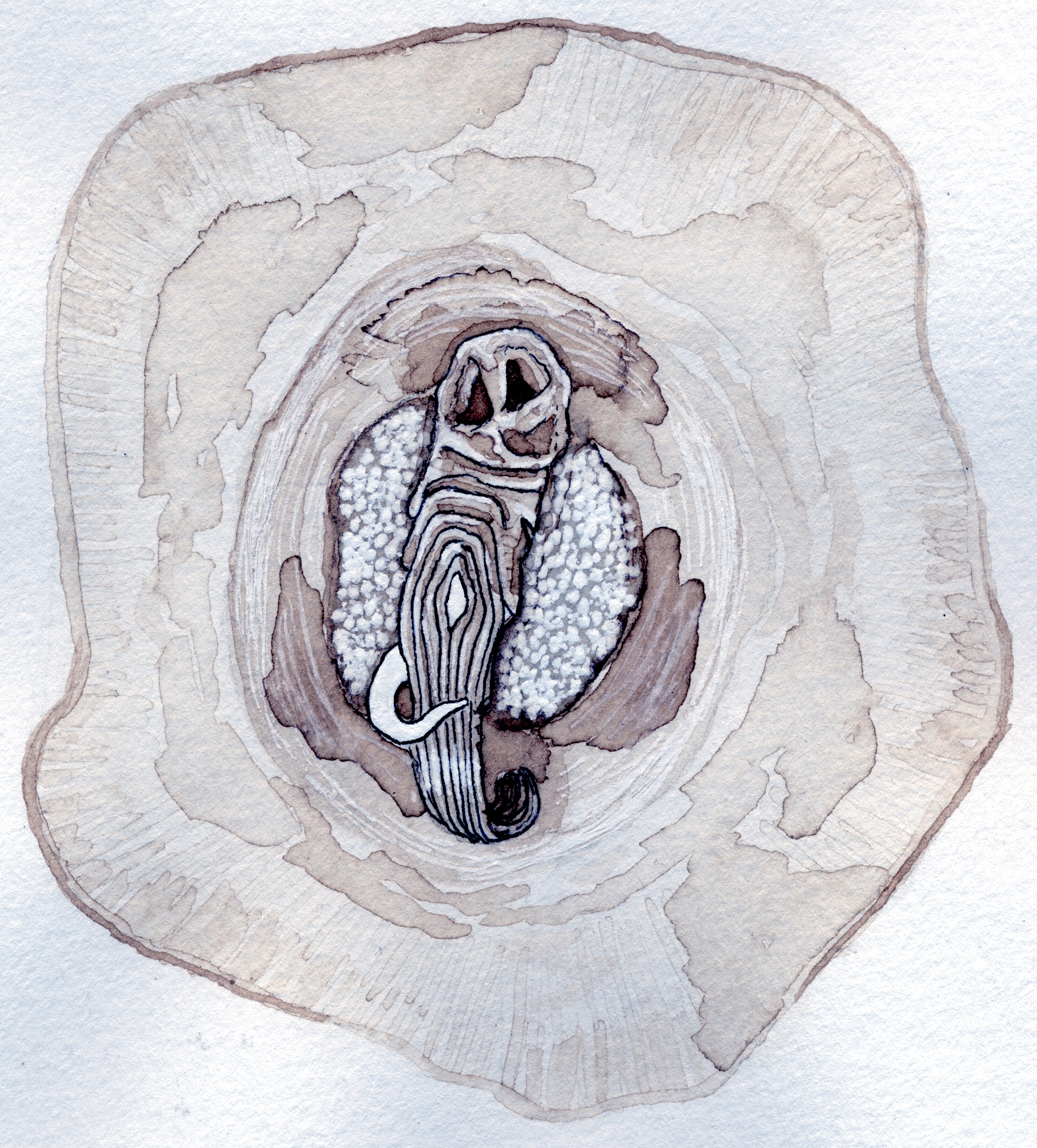
Chelonibia testudinaria underside, by Melissa Merrill

C. patula has a conical shaped shell with smooth plates, with long cirri IV, V and VI. Dwarf males often settle on the plates and are distributed randomly. In contrast, C. testudinaria has a flatter, less conical shape, the cirri IV, V and VI are short, and there are shallow oval depressions on the radii at the junctions of the plates. Dwarf males commonly settle in these depressions.

=== Size, Growth and Age ===
The growth rate of C. testudinaria follows a non-linear growth pattern where rate of increase in length slows with age. Applying a von Bertalanffy growth model to the population suggests that the maximum achievable size of C. testudinaria on loggerhead turtles in the wild is approximately 70 mm (2.8 in) in rostro-carinal length. The largest individuals reported to date indicate that this species can live for at least 21 months. However, mortality is (at least partially) controlled by the scute sloughing frequency of host turtles, meaning that barnacles living on hosts which shed less frequently, or not at all, may live longer.

== Ecology ==
Chelonibia testudinaria are found to attach themselves to shells/objects of the larger organisms from each region of the host's body. C. testudinaria preferentially behaviorally select green turtles as hosts compared to Chelonibia caretta, which select Hawksbill sea turtles as hosts. On a turtle's shell, the greatest water flow is over the front central portion. It has been shown that C. testudinaria can relocate on the turtle's shell, usually towards the optimal position with maximum water flow and thus the greatest filter feeding opportunities. The movement is around 1.4 mm (0.06 in) or less per day and is probably achieved by advancing the shell forward with each increment of growth. Over several months, several scutes can be crossed by these means.
