= Chelonibia =

Chelonibia Temporal range: Miocene–Recent
- Chelonibia patula on the blue crab Callinectes sapidus

Scientific classification
- Kingdom: Animalia
- Phylum: Arthropoda
- Class: Thecostraca
- Subclass: Cirripedia
- Order: Balanomorpha
- Superfamily: Coronuloidea
- Family: Chelonibiidae; Pilsbry, 1916
- Subfamily: Chelonibiinae
- Genus: Chelonibia; Leach, 1817

Genus of barnacles

Chelonibia is a genus of acorn barnacles in the family Chelonibiidae of the subphylum Crustacea. Its members are epizootic and live attached to manatees, turtles, marine molluscs, crabs and horseshoe crabs in all tropical and subtropical oceans. In a few instances, they have been found on sea snakes, alligators and inanimate substrates, but they are not found in the typical habitats of barnacles – on rocks, docks or boats.

== Phylogeny ==
They appear to be the sister group to the Balanidae.

== Fossils ==
The fossil record of Chelonibia ranges back to the Miocene.

== Species ==
The genus contains four extant species:

- Chelonibia caretta (Spengler, 1790)
- Chelonibia manati Gruvel, 1903
- Chelonibia patula (Ranzani, 1818)
- Chelonibia testudinaria (Linnaeus, 1758)

Recent molecular genetic work suggests that three of the species, Chelonibia manati, C. patula and C. testudinaria, are all the same species. Depending on the host species, they develop plastically very distinct morphology but cannot be distinguished on the genetic level.

Three species are only known from the fossil record:

- Chelonibia capellini de Alessandri, 1895
- Chelonibia depressa Seguenza, 1876
- Chelonibia hemisphaerica Rothpletz & Simonelli, 1890
