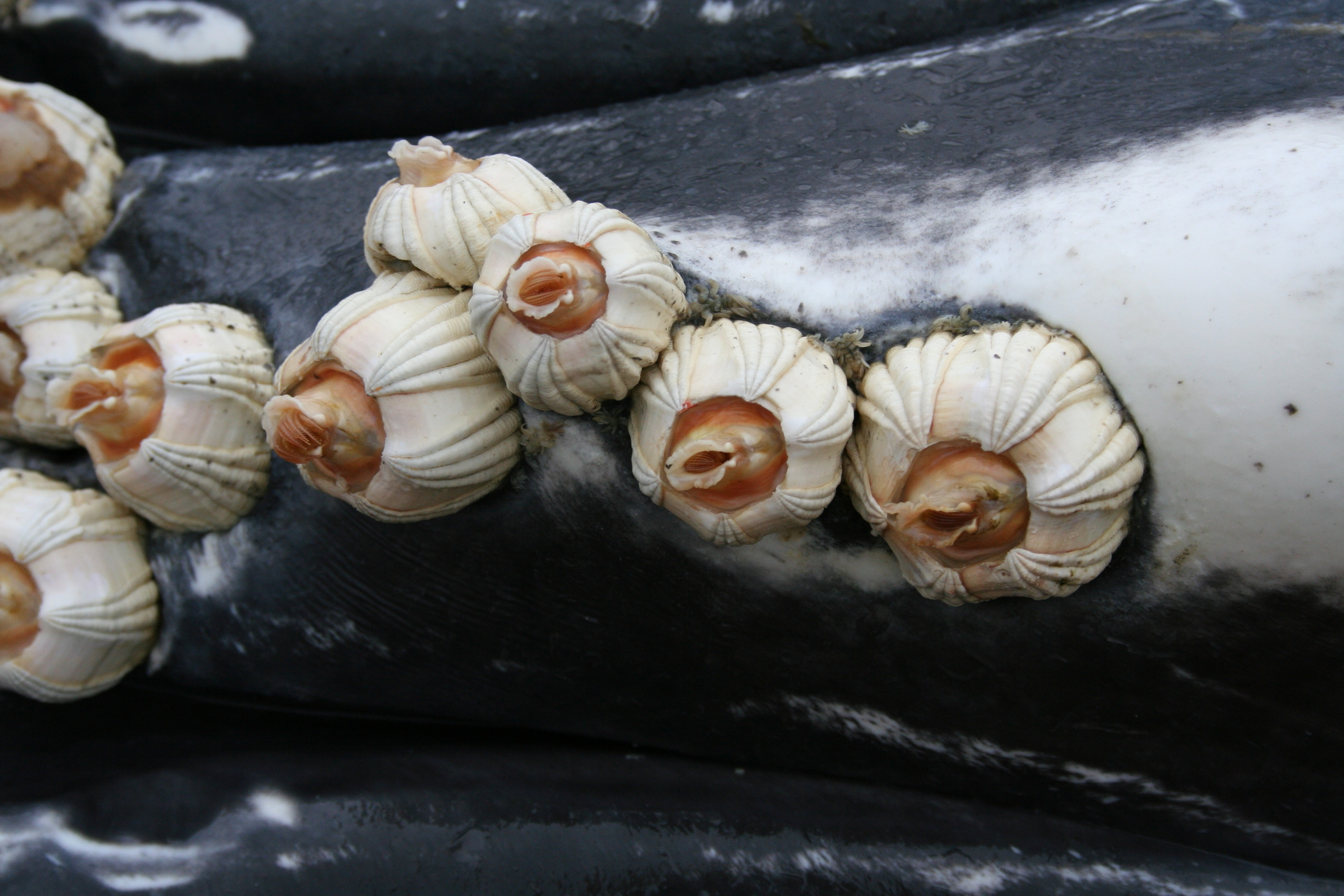
- On a humpback whale

Scientific classification
- Kingdom: Animalia
- Phylum: Arthropoda
- Class: Thecostraca
- Subclass: Cirripedia
- Order: Balanomorpha
- Family: Coronulidae
- Genus: Coronula
- Species: C. diadema

Binomial name
- Coronula diadema (Linnaeus, 1767)

= Coronula diadema =

Species of whale barnacle

Coronula diadema is a species of whale barnacle that lives on the skin of humpback whales and certain other species of whale. This species was first described by Carl Linnaeus in the 1767 12th edition of his Systema Naturae.

== Description ==
As its name suggests, Coronula diadema resembles a crown in appearance, but as it grows it becomes more cylindrical; large specimens may be 5 cm (2 in) tall and 6 cm (2.4 in) in diameter. There are six broad wall plates surrounding a hexagonal orifice at the top, which is protected by a pair of opercular valves. The plates have fine longitudinal striations and the lower half often have irregular transverse striations.

== Distribution and habitat ==
C. diadema is found on the external surface of whales. When discussing this species, the zoologist Charles Darwin (who devoted much of his career to barnacles) stated that he knew of the precise locations where four specimens were found, the arctic seas around Scandinavia, the east coast of North America, near the coast of the British Isles, and from the Gulf Stream. Another reported location was New Zealand, but Darwin suspected that this was an error, and might be Coronula reginae. The host whales are mostly baleen whales, particularly humpback whales (Megaptera novaengliae), with the barnacles attaching themselves to the head, the flukes, the flippers, various grooves and the genital slit. This barnacle has also been found on the blue whale (Balaenoptera musculus), the southern right whale (Eubalaena australis), the fin whale (Balaenoptera physalus), the sperm whale (Physeter macrocephalus) and the northern bottlenose whale (Hyperoodon ampullatus).

For 'the role of Coronula diadema on a humpback whale's pectoral fins helping it to defend its calves from killer whales, see Humpback whale#Fins.

== Life cycle ==
Most barnacles are hermaphrodites and can fertilize each other but not themselves, so they need to be clustered closely together to be able to breed. An individual acting as a male extends his long penis to impregnate the mantle cavity of another individual in close proximity. Here internal fertilisation takes place and the embryos are brooded until the first moult. The free-swimming nauplius larvae form part of the plankton and pass through six moults before becoming non-feeding cyprid larvae. Laboratory experiments suggest that the cyprid larvae are induced to settle and undergo metamorphosis into juvenile barnacles in response to chemical cues from the skin of suitable host whales.

== Gallery ==
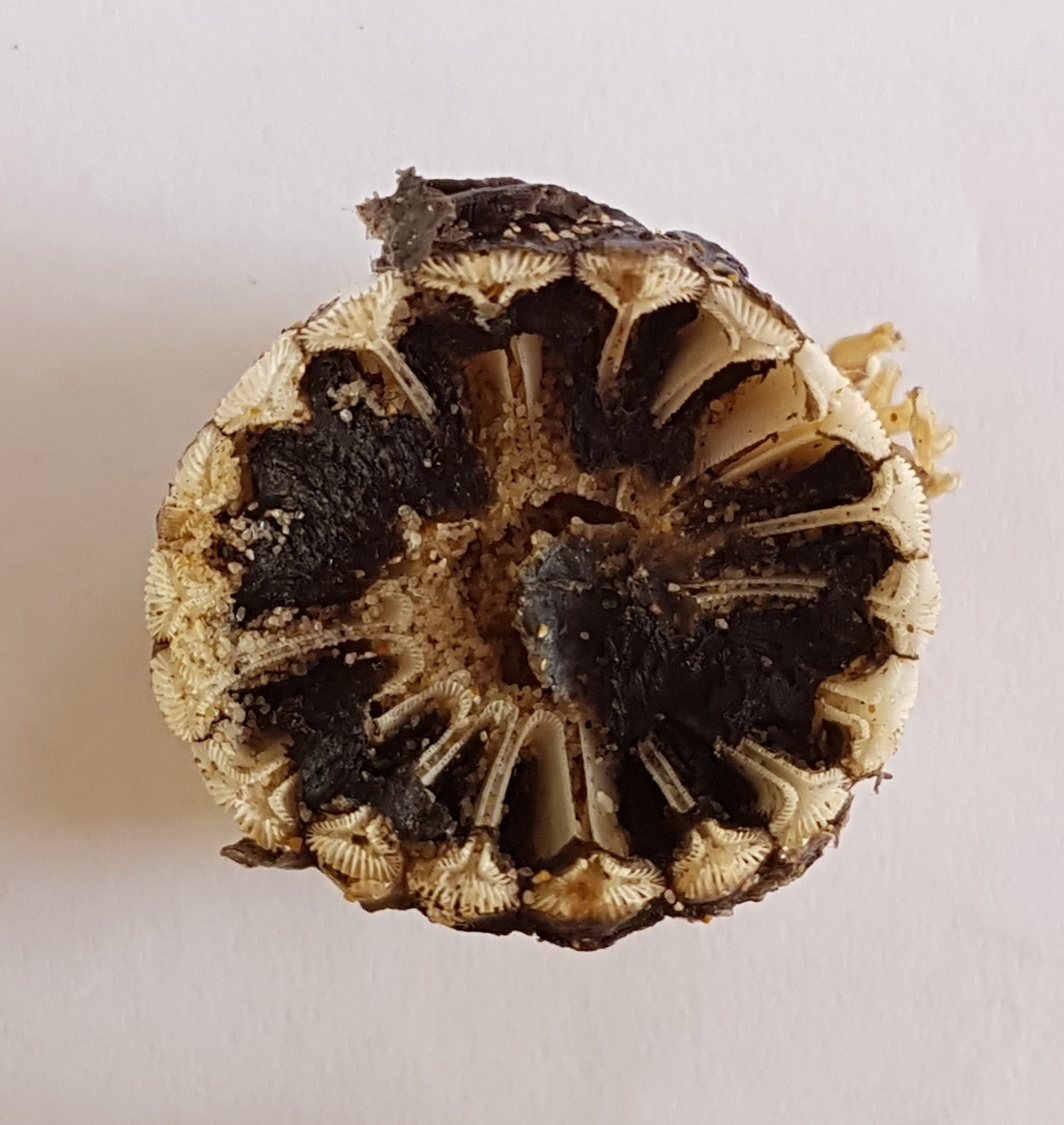
Bottom view - diameter 20mm

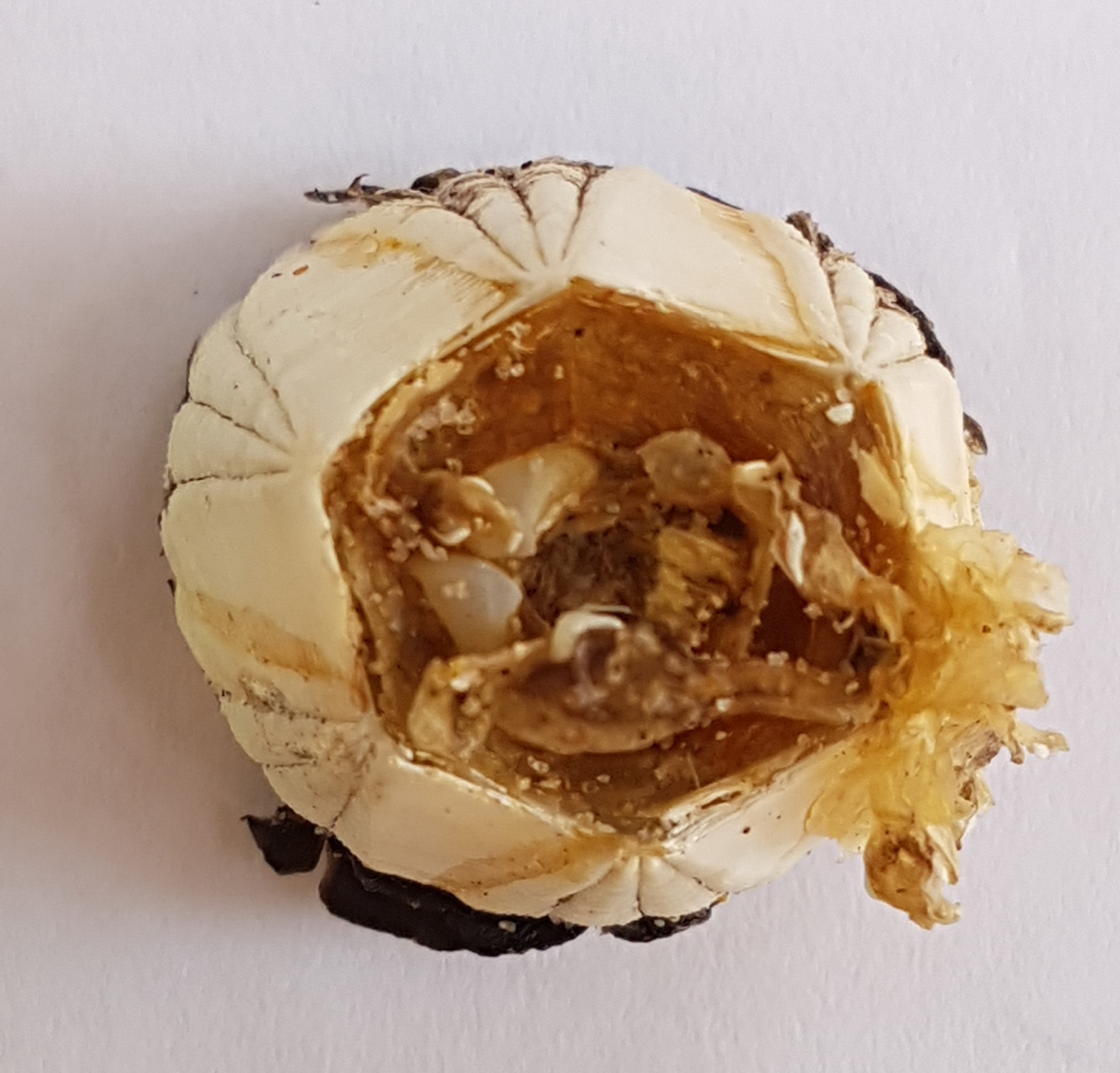
Top view

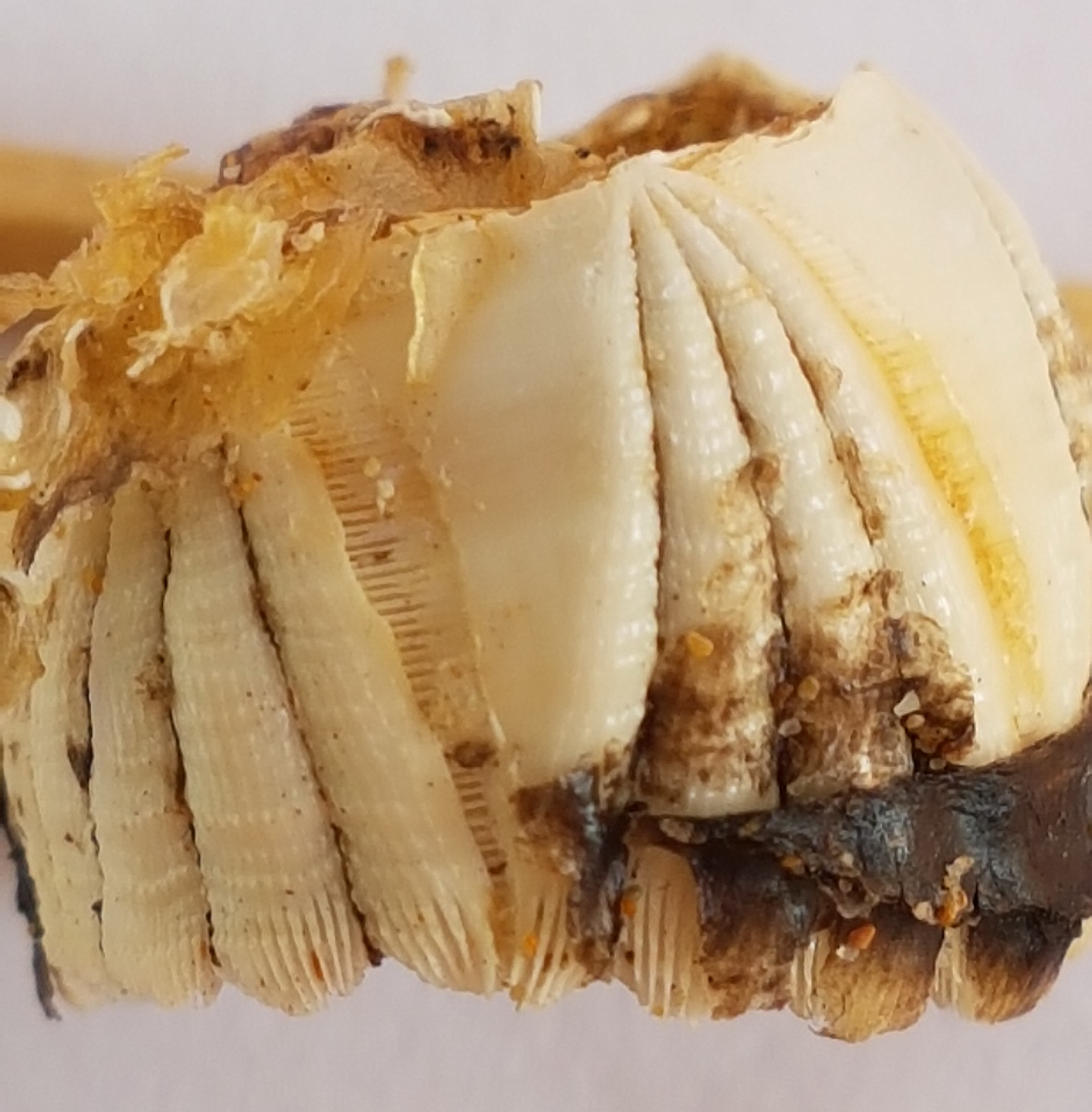
Side view
