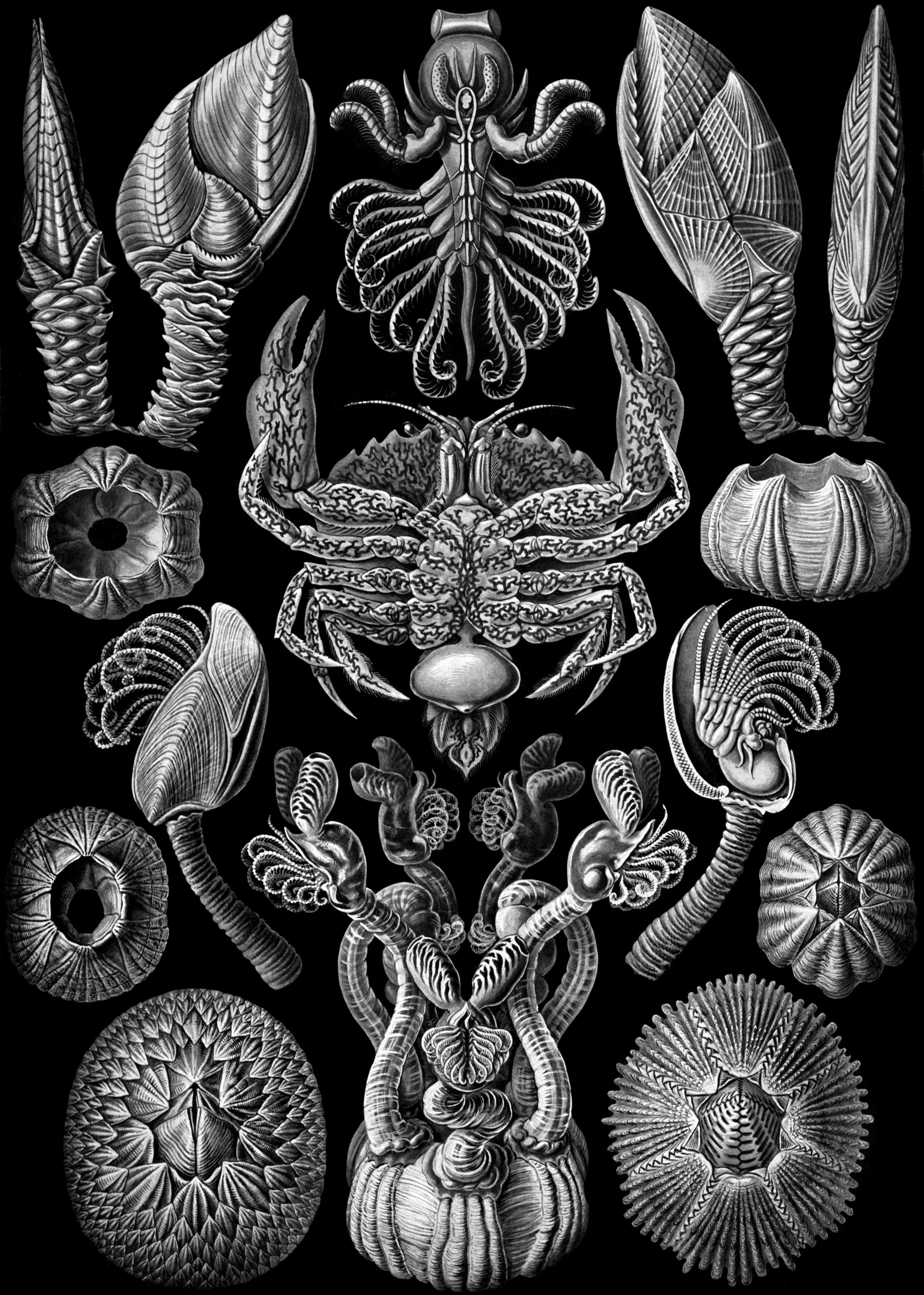
- Group of adults on Coronula diadema (bottom centre)

Scientific classification
- Kingdom: Animalia
- Phylum: Arthropoda
- Class: Thecostraca
- Subclass: Cirripedia
- Order: Scalpellomorpha
- Family: Lepadidae
- Genus: Conchoderma
- Species: C. auritum

Binomial name
- Conchoderma auritum (Linnaeus, 1767)

Synonyms
- Lepas aurita Linnaeus, 1767; Conchoderma leporinum Olfers, 1814

= Conchoderma auritum =

Species of crustacean

Conchoderma auritum, the rabbit-ear barnacle, is a species of barnacle in the family Lepadidae. It is found in Europe, Africa, and New Zealand.

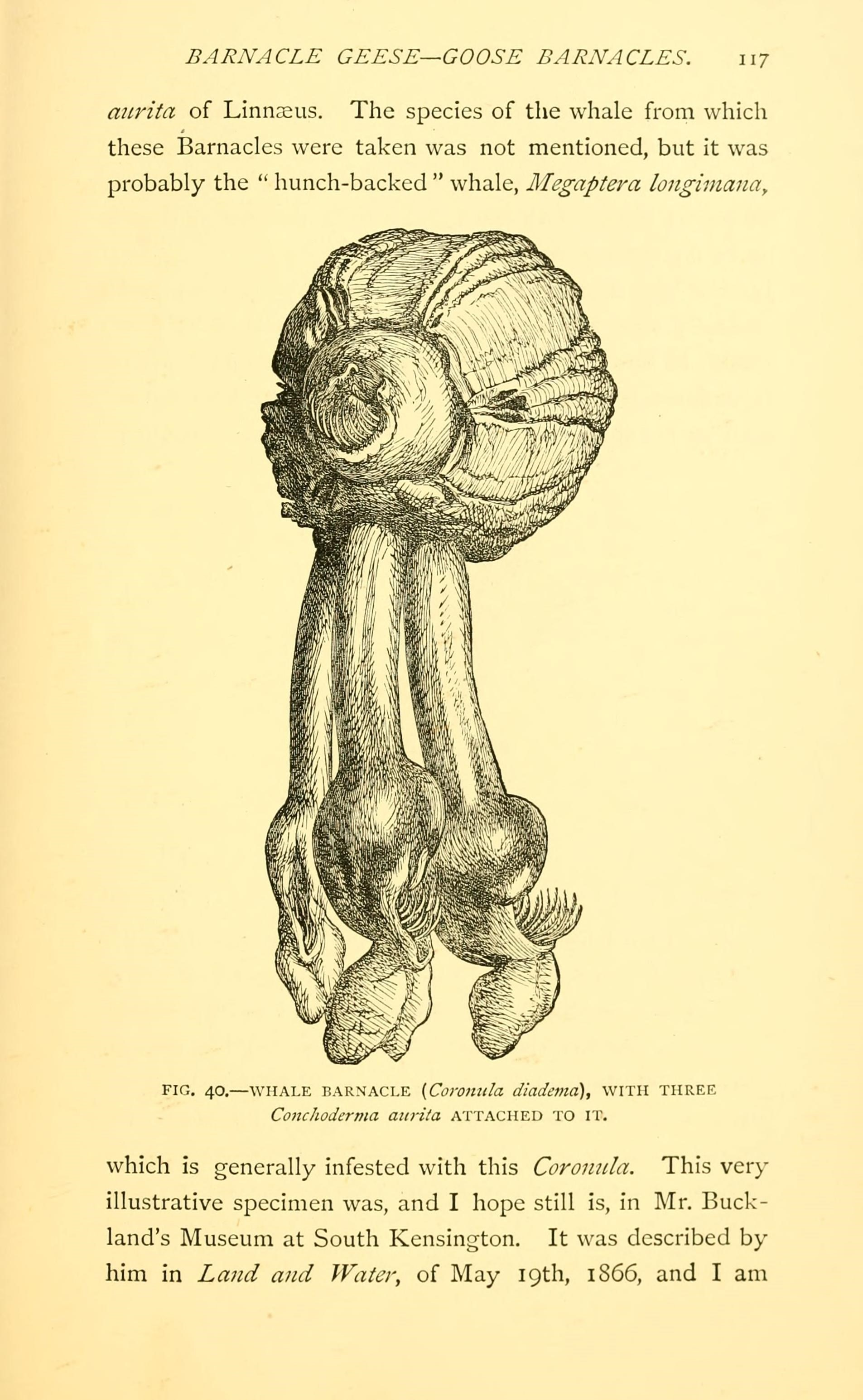
Rabbit-ear barnacle, Conchoderma auritum
