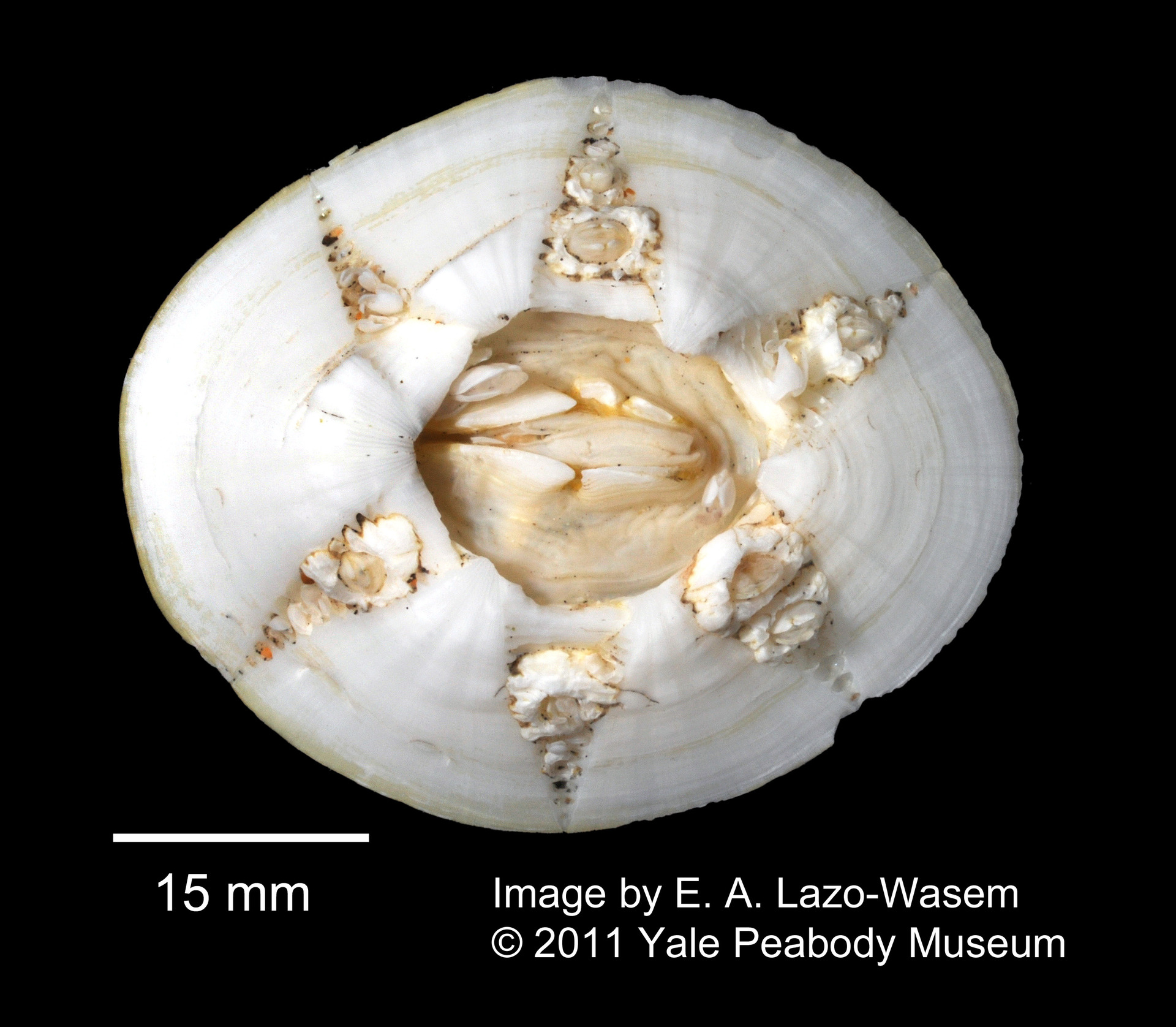
- Chelonibia testudinaria, Mexico (Pacific)

Scientific classification
- Kingdom: Animalia
- Phylum: Arthropoda
- Clade: Pancrustacea
- Class: Thecostraca
- Subclass: Cirripedia
- Order: Balanomorpha
- Superfamily: Coronuloidea
- Family: Chelonibiidae; Pilsbry, 1916

Subfamilies
- Chelonibiinae Pilsbry, 1916; † Protochelonibiinae Harzhauser & Newman, 2011

= Chelonibiidae =

Family of crustaceans

Chelonibiidae is a family of turtle barnacles in the order Balanomorpha. There are at least three genera and about eight described species in Chelonibiidae.

== Genera ==
These genera belong to the family Chelonibiidae:

- Chelonibia Leach, 1817
- Stephanolepas Fischer, 1886
- † Protochelonibia Harzhauser & Newman, 2011
