= Platylepadidae =

Family of barnacles

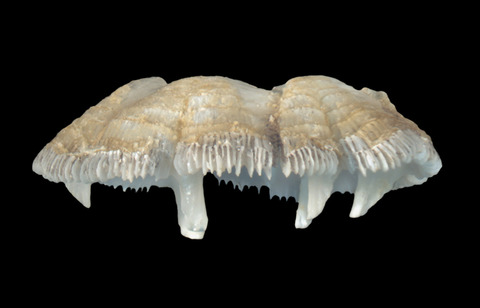
Platylepas hexastylos

In the past, Platylepadidae has been considered a family of barnacles of the order Sessilia. Research published in 2021 by Chan et al. resulted in the genera of Platylepadidae being merged with that of Balanidae, except Stephanolepas which was moved to Chelonibiidae. In the same work, Sessilia was not retained as an order of barnacles.
