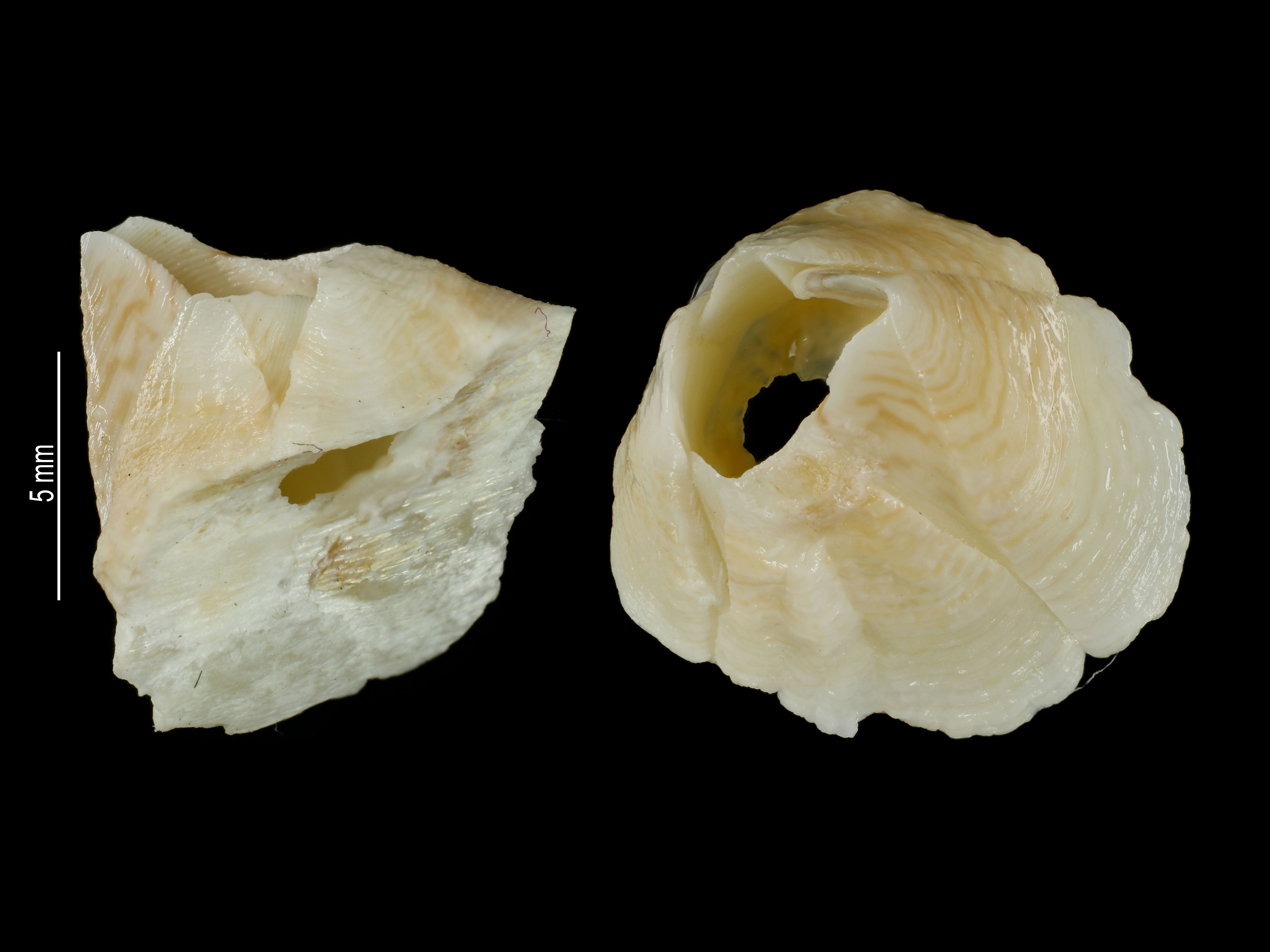
- Tetrapachylasma arcuatum, South Pacific

Scientific classification
- Kingdom: Animalia
- Phylum: Arthropoda
- Clade: Pancrustacea
- Class: Thecostraca
- Subclass: Cirripedia
- Order: Balanomorpha
- Family: Pachylasmatidae
- Subfamily: Pachylasmatinae
- Genus: Tetrapachylasma
- Species: T. arcuatum

Binomial name
- Tetrapachylasma arcuatum Jones, 2000

= Tetrapachylasma arcuatum =

Species of barnacle

Tetrapachylasma arcuatum is a species of symmetrical sessile barnacle in the family Pachylasmatidae.
