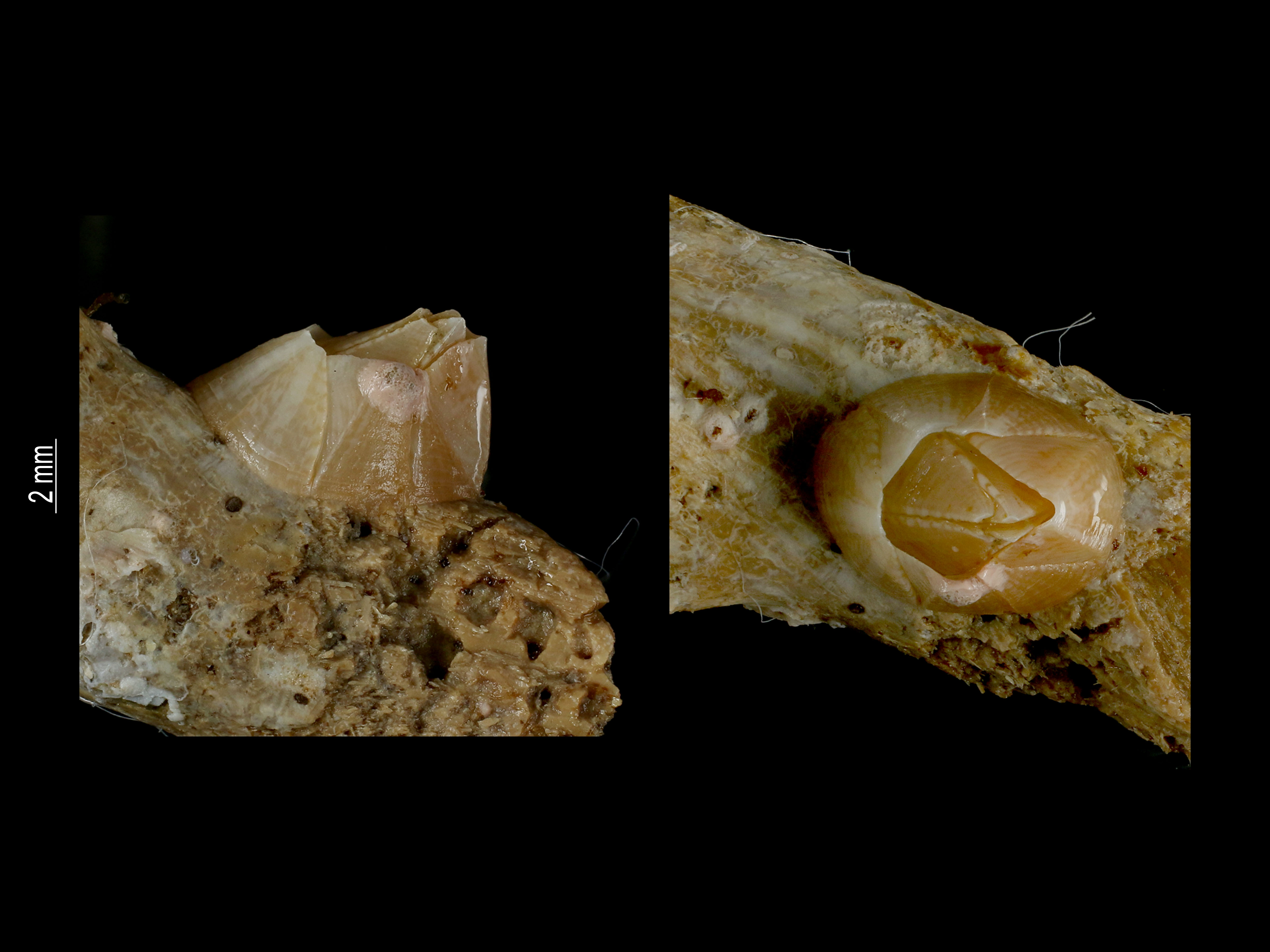
- Pachylasma laeviscutum, South Pacific

Scientific classification
- Kingdom: Animalia
- Phylum: Arthropoda
- Clade: Pancrustacea
- Class: Thecostraca
- Subclass: Cirripedia
- Order: Balanomorpha
- Family: Pachylasmatidae
- Subfamily: Pachylasmatinae
- Genus: Pachylasma
- Species: P. laeviscutum

Binomial name
- Pachylasma laeviscutum Jones, 2000

= Pachylasma laeviscutum =

Species of barnacle

Pachylasma laeviscutum is a species of symmetrical sessile barnacle in the family Pachylasmatidae.
