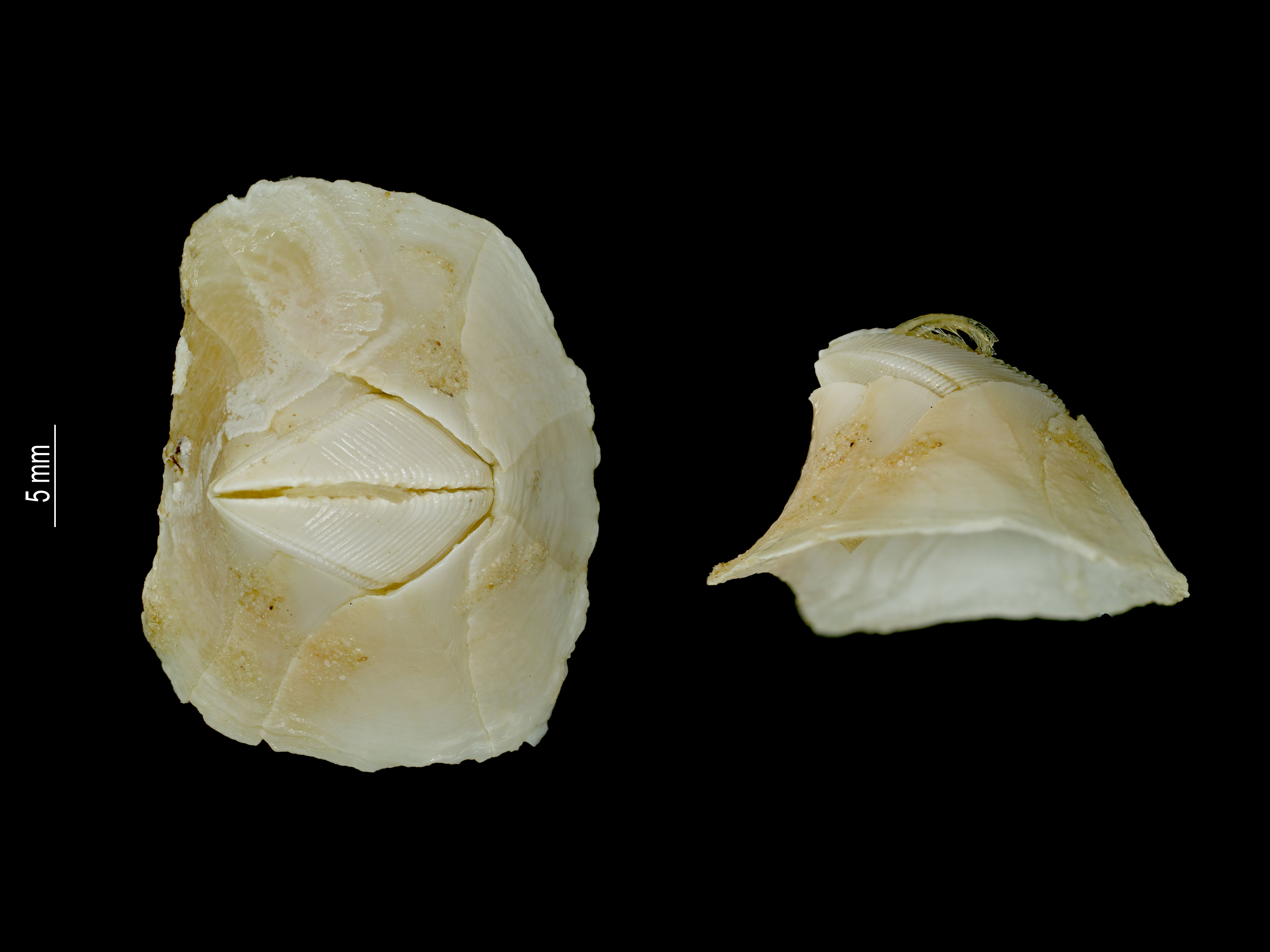
- Eutomolasma orbiculatum, South Pacific

Scientific classification
- Kingdom: Animalia
- Phylum: Arthropoda
- Class: Thecostraca
- Subclass: Cirripedia
- Order: Balanomorpha
- Family: Pachylasmatidae
- Subfamily: Pachylasmatinae
- Genus: Eutomolasma
- Species: E. orbiculatum

Binomial name
- Eutomolasma orbiculatum Jones, 2000

= Eutomolasma orbiculatum =

Species of barnacle

Eutomolasma orbiculatum is a species of symmetrical sessile barnacle in the family Pachylasmatidae.
