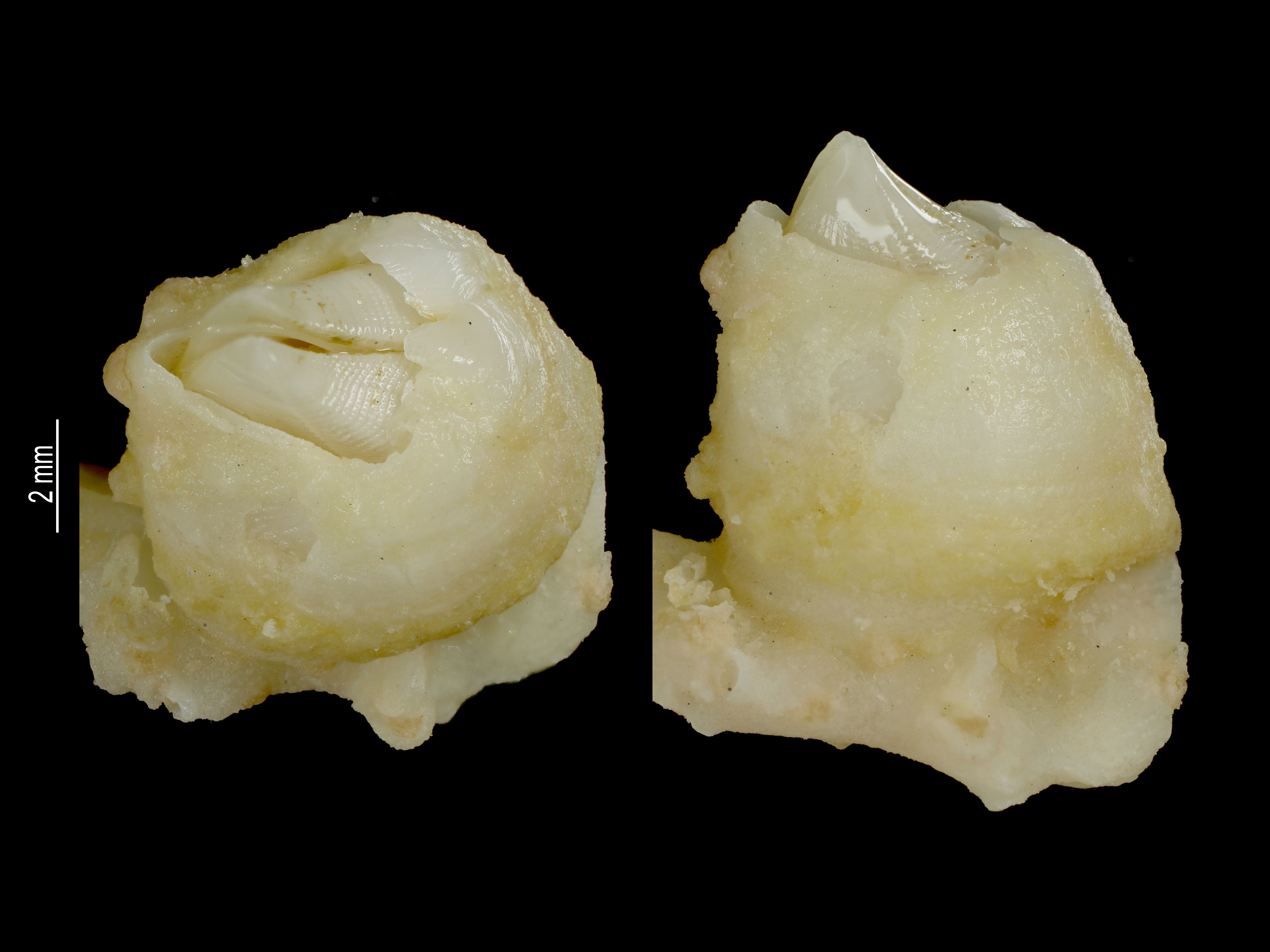
- Eurylasma pyramidale, South Pacific

Scientific classification
- Kingdom: Animalia
- Phylum: Arthropoda
- Class: Thecostraca
- Subclass: Cirripedia
- Order: Balanomorpha
- Family: Pachylasmatidae
- Subfamily: Pachylasmatinae
- Genus: Eurylasma
- Species: E. pyramidale

Binomial name
- Eurylasma pyramidale Jones, 2000

= Eurylasma pyramidale =

Species of barnacle

Eurylasma pyramidale is a species of symmetrical sessile barnacle in the family Pachylasmatidae.
