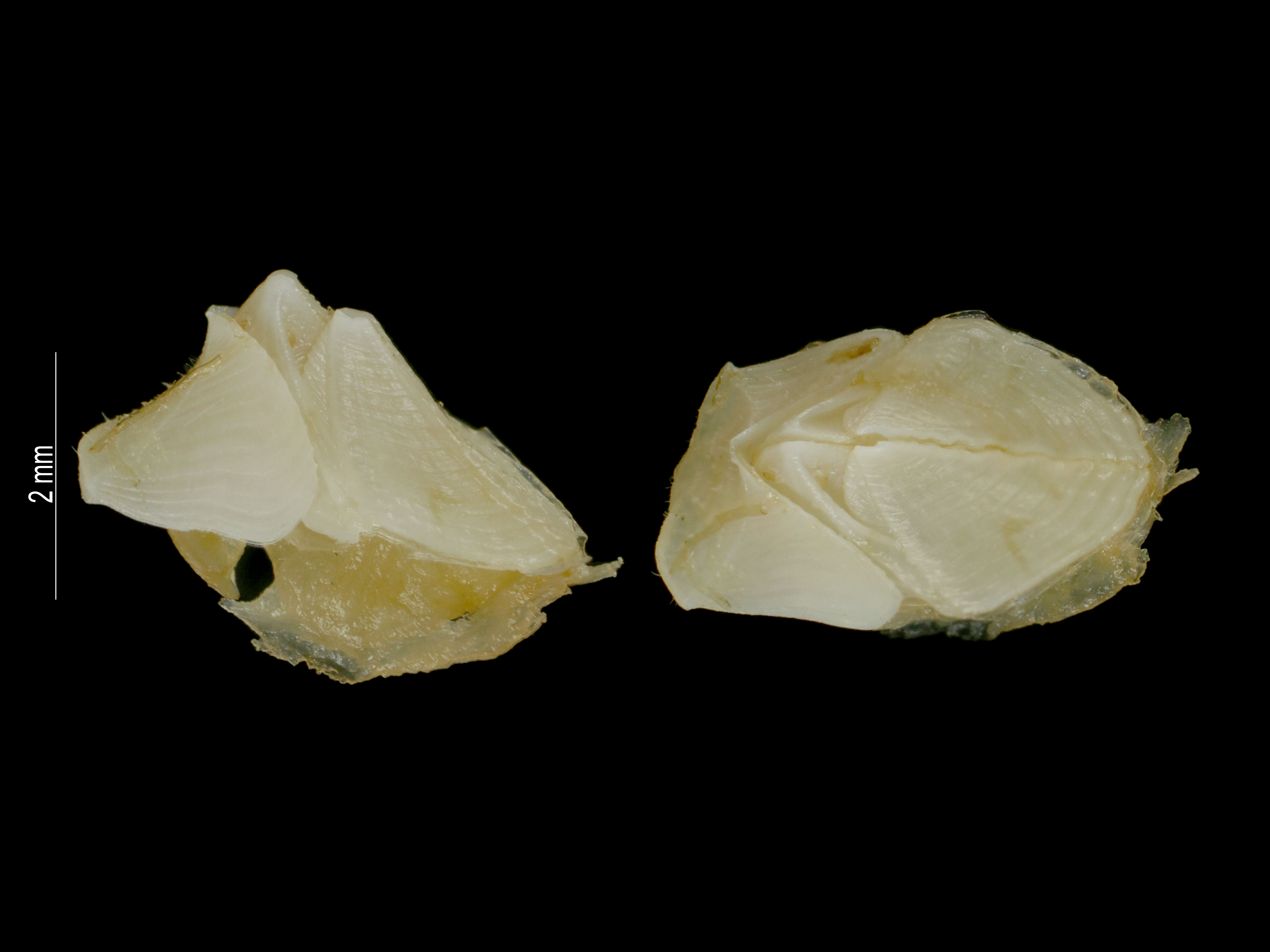
- Microlasma fragile, South Pacific

Scientific classification
- Kingdom: Animalia
- Phylum: Arthropoda
- Class: Thecostraca
- Subclass: Cirripedia
- Order: Balanomorpha
- Family: Pachylasmatidae
- Subfamily: Pachylasmatinae
- Genus: Microlasma
- Species: M. fragile

Binomial name
- Microlasma fragile Jones, 2000

= Microlasma fragile =

Species of barnacle

Microlasma fragile is a species of symmetrical sessile barnacle in the family Pachylasmatidae.
