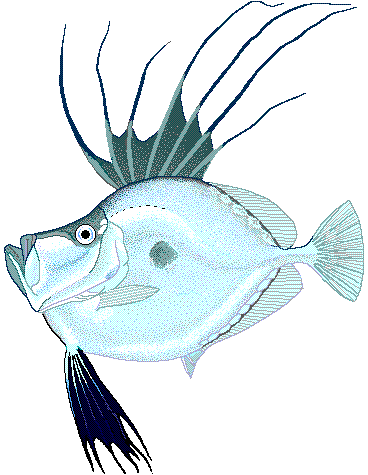
- Mirror dory, Zenopsis nebulosa

Scientific classification
- Kingdom: Animalia
- Phylum: Chordata
- Class: Actinopterygii
- Order: Zeiformes
- Family: Zeidae; Latreille, 1825

Genera
- Zenopsis; Zeus

= Zeidae =

Family of ray-finned fishes

The Zeidae (named after the fish zaeus from Pliny the Elder) are a family of large, showy, deep-bodied zeiform marine fish—the "true dories". Found in the Atlantic, Indian, and Pacific Oceans, the family contains just six species in two genera. All species are important and highly regarded food fish supporting commercial fisheries, and some—such as the John Dory (Zeus faber)—are enjoyed in large public aquaria. These fish are caught primarily by deep-sea trawling.

Several other families have members sharing the common name 'dory', some of which—i.e., those of genera Capromimus, Cyttomimus, and Cyttus—were once placed within the Zeidae. The first two genera are now found within the Zenionidae (or Zeniontidae), and the last genus has been given its own family, Cyttidae.

== Description ==
All dories share the same roughly discoid, laterally compressed body plan. The head is large and sloping to concave in profile with thin and soft bones; the oblique mouth is also large and in Zenopsis species, it is noticeably upturned. The jaws are massive and highly extensile. The large eyes are situated high on the head and are directed dorsolaterally. There is a perceptible hump in the back beginning just behind the eye; it is topped by a conspicuous, crest-shaped spinous dorsal fin containing 7–10 spines which descend in height towards the posterior. In adults of some species, the dorsal spines are adorned with long, streamer-like filaments. A second, much lower dorsal fin (with 22–37 soft rays) extends down the rest of the back, in a slight retrorse direction due to the body's curvature. The caudal peduncle is thin and the caudal fin is small and truncate (brush-shaped).

The pelvic fins are thoracic, spineless, and greatly elongated; the rays are free of their membranes distally. The pectoral fins are small, short, and rounded, inserted fairly low on the body and posterior to the pelvics. The anal fin contains 1–4 spines anteriorly and 20–39 soft rays with their height, direction, origin, and terminus mirroring those of the soft dorsal fin. Along the belly are a series of spinous scutes—scales modified into hard, bony plates—forming an armoured ventral keel. Similar scutes also cover the base of the dorsal and anal fins. The opercular bones are free of any spines or serrations. The vertebrae number 29–34, and adults possess degenerate gill rakers.

The body is apparently naked; if present, the scales are microscopic. Coloration in life is typically a highly lustrous silver, with younger dories covered in a number of randomly placed dark, dusky spots. These spots tend to fade with age; the largest (and oldest) specimens have only one dark spot, located roughly central on the flanks. In the cape dory (Zeus capensis) this spot is located just below the junction of the spinous and soft dorsal fins; in the John dory the spot is central and surrounded by a yellow ring, with the body also covered in cloud-like splotches of muddy sepia. Zeus capensis and Z. faber are tied as the largest dory species at a maximum 90 centimetres total length, with the other three species only slightly smaller.

== Life history ==
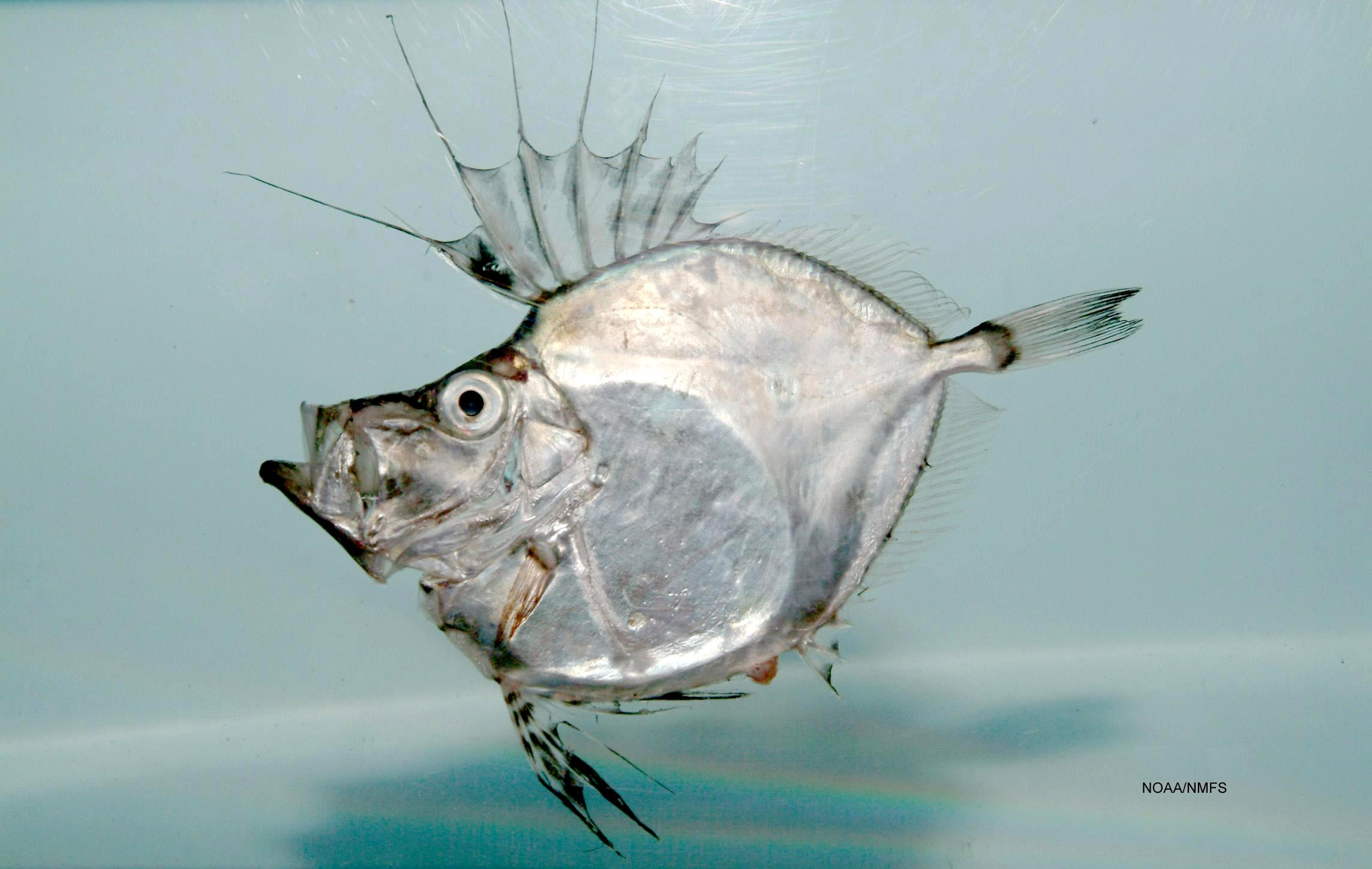
The silvery John dory (Zenopsis conchifera) is typical of the Zeidae, with its scute-covered belly and filamentous spiny dorsal fin.

As benthic fish, dories are typically found close to or directly over the sea bottom, but occasionally in midwater as well. Depths frequented are moderate, ca. 50–800 metres; muddy substrates are preferred, usually over the continental shelf and slope, near the coast. Some, such as the silvery John dory (Zenopsis conchifera), form small and loose schools; while others, such as the John dory, are generally solitary when not spawning. Dories are poor swimmers; they propel themselves primarily via a balistiform (i.e., like the triggerfish's) mode of locomotion, with the dorsal and anal fins undulating in unison as the main propulsive force and the pectoral fins used for stabilisation and turning.

The reproduction of the Zeidae are not well studied as a whole; all are assumed to be non-guarding, substrate scatterers; that is, a large number of tiny eggs and sperm are released en masse and scattered over a wide area. The fertilized eggs are negatively buoyant and sink into the substrate, to which they adhere. Spawning activity appears to peak in the summer months in the John dory, and in the winter months in the mirror dory (Zenopsis nebulosa). In the latter species fertilization is reported to be internal (within the oviduct), whereas in the former species it is external. Growth is rapid and sexual maturity is reached by 3–4 years.

The Zeidae are top predators in their habitat and are noted for their marked stenophagy: juveniles feed exclusively on zooplankton, such as copepods, euphausiids, mysids, apheids, pandalids, palaemonids, and other small crustaceans. Conversely, adults feed almost exclusively on active schooling fish, such as pearlsides, porgies, young carangids (e.g., mackerels), and clupeids (e.g., sardines and pilchards); and other benthic fish, such as dragonets, gobies, filefish, flatfish, bandfish, and sea chubs; and occasionally on cephalopods such as squid and cuttlefish.

Predators of dories include large sharks such as the dusky shark (Carcharhinus obscurus) and other requiem sharks, and larger shelf- and slope-dwelling bony fish, such as merluccid hakes.
