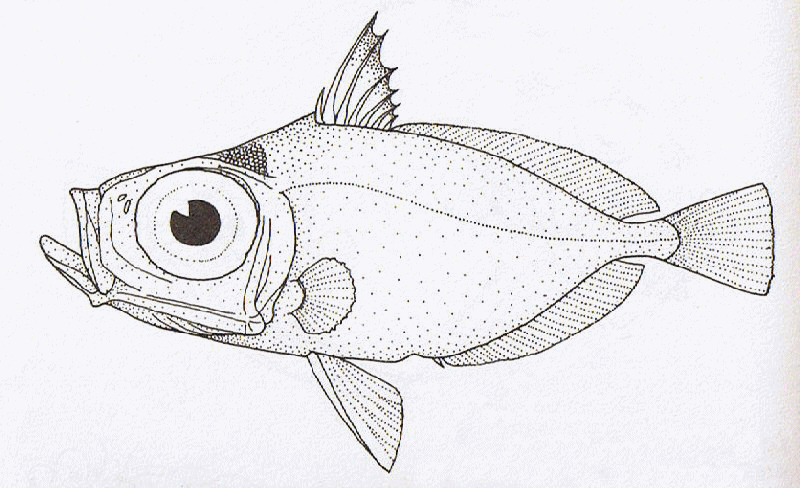
- Drawing of an elongate dory by Dr Tony Ayling

Scientific classification
- Kingdom: Animalia
- Phylum: Chordata
- Class: Actinopterygii
- Order: Zeiformes
- Family: Zeniontidae
- Genus: Zenion
- Species: Z. leptolepis

Binomial name
- Zenion leptolepis (Gilchrist & von Bonde, 1924)

= Elongate dory =

Species of fish

The elongate dory (Zenion leptolepis) is a dory in the genus Zenion found around South Africa, Mozambique, Kenya and New Zealand at depths of between 330 to 700 metres (1,080 to 2,300 ft). It grows to a total length of 16 centimetres (6.3 in).
