= John Dore =

John or Jon Dore may refer to:

- John Dore (basketball), Canadian basketball coach
- John Clark Dore (1822–1900), American educator and politician from New Hampshire
- John F. Dore (1881–1938), mayor of Seattle
- John Dore (tourist operator) (1872–1945), New Zealand carrier and explorer
- Jon Dore (born 1976), Canadian comedian and actor

== See also ==
- John Doar, American lawyer
- John Dory, a type of fish
- John Dory (song), possibly the namesake for the fish
