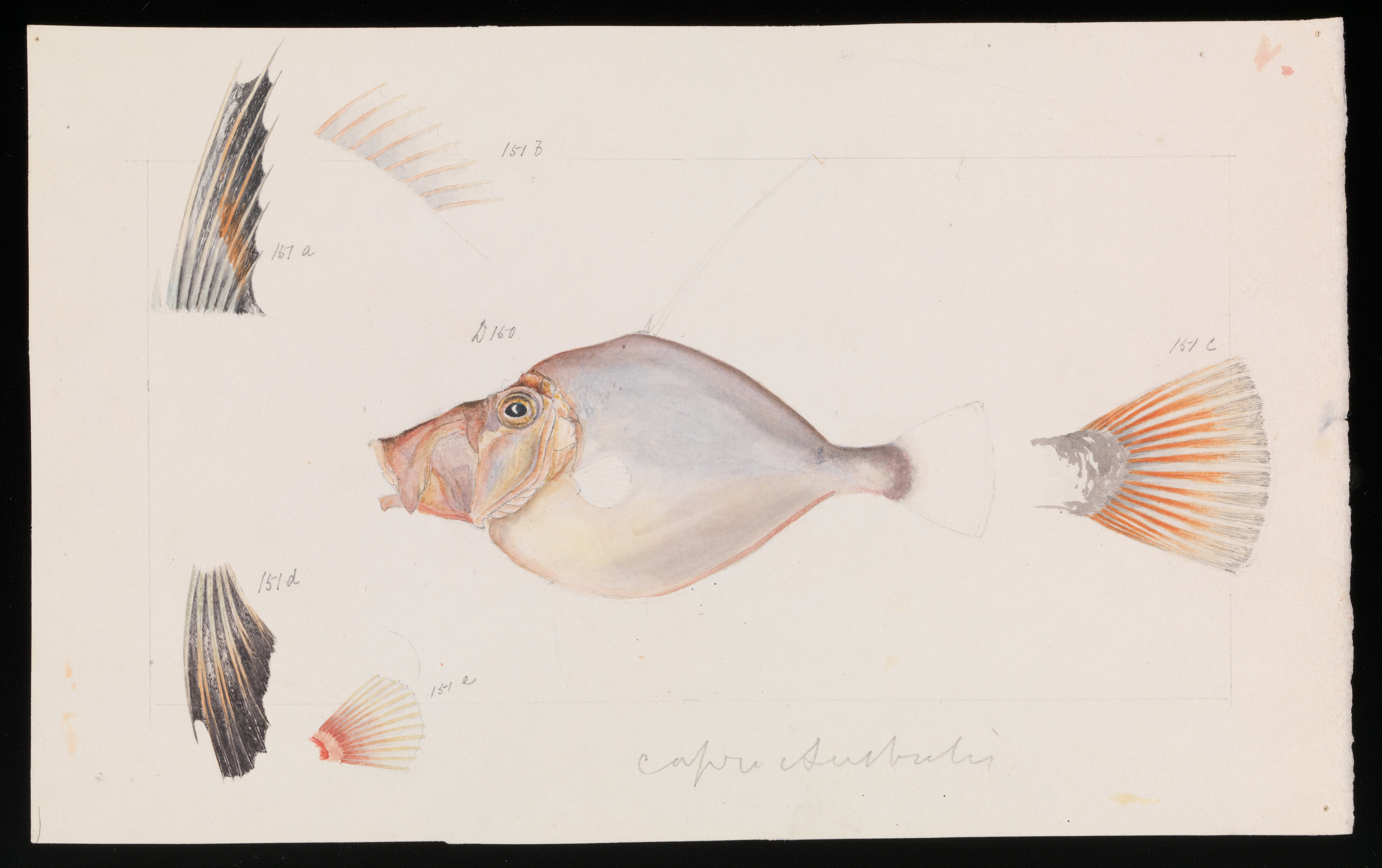

Scientific classification
- Kingdom: Animalia
- Phylum: Chordata
- Class: Actinopterygii
- Order: Zeiformes
- Family: Cyttidae
- Genus: Cyttus
- Species: C. australis

Binomial name
- Cyttus australis (J. Richardson, 1843)

= Silver dory =

Species of fish

The silver dory (Cyttus australis) is a dory, in the genus Cyttus, found around southern Australia, on the continental shelf at depths of between 10 and 350 m. Its length is about 40 cm.
