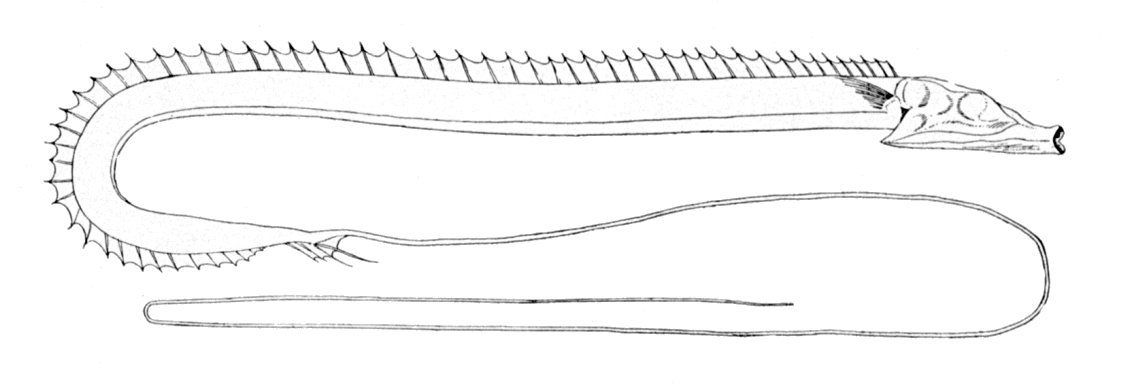
- Stylephorus chordatus
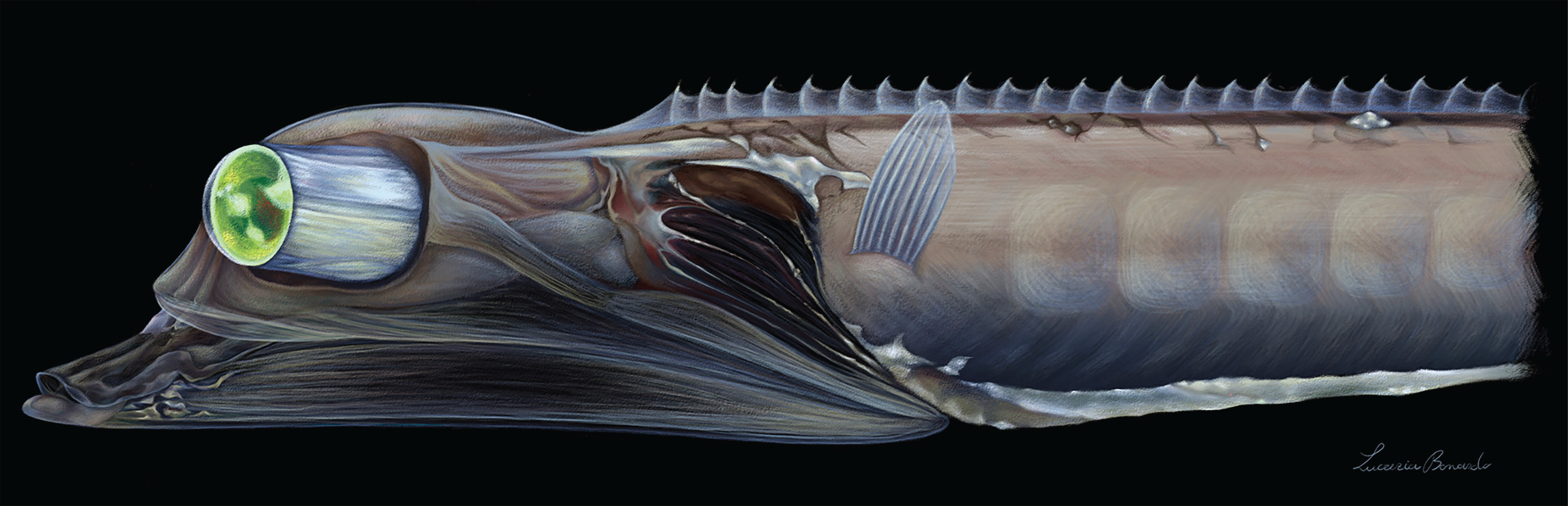
- †Parastylephorus anatoides (life restoration)

Scientific classification
- Kingdom: Animalia
- Phylum: Chordata
- Class: Actinopterygii
- Division: Teleostei
- Order: Gadiformes
- Suborder: Stylephoroidei
- Family: Stylephoridae; Regan, 1924

Genera
- Stylephorus Shaw, 1791; †Parastylephorus Ridolfi et al., 2026

= Stylephoridae =

Stylephoridae Temporal range: Middle Eocene (Bartonian) to present

Family of fishes

Stylephoridae is a family of marine ray-finned fishes. It is the only family in the suborder Stylephoroidei and, depending on its classification, the order Stylephoriformes. Historically placed in the order Lampriformes, more recent analyses incorporating genetic data frequently ally it with the Gadiformes as its basalmost member. It contains two genera, commonly called tube-eyes, after the unusual, large, tubular eye morphology. These comprise the extant Stylephorus and the extinct Parastylephorus.

Both known genera exhibit a highly modified skull and jaw morphology for cranial kinesis, allowing for rapid expansion of the buccal cavity for suction feeding. Stylephorids are further characterized by a very elongate and compressed, ribbon-like body with a dorsal fin running along the entire upper margin of the body. Both genera exhibit a reduction of squamation (scale covering), with Stylephorus effectively lacking scales entirely, and Parastylephorus retaining a single row of lateral-line scales along each side of the body.

The large number of shared features between Parastylephorus and Stylephorus, despite living 40 million years apart, indicates an unexpected degree of morphological stasis within Stylephoridae. This suggests the stylephorid body plan is successful in deep sea environments, supported by the sustained stability of this region of the ocean. The stylephorid lineage had diverged from other gadiforms by at least Campanian stage of the Late Cretaceous.

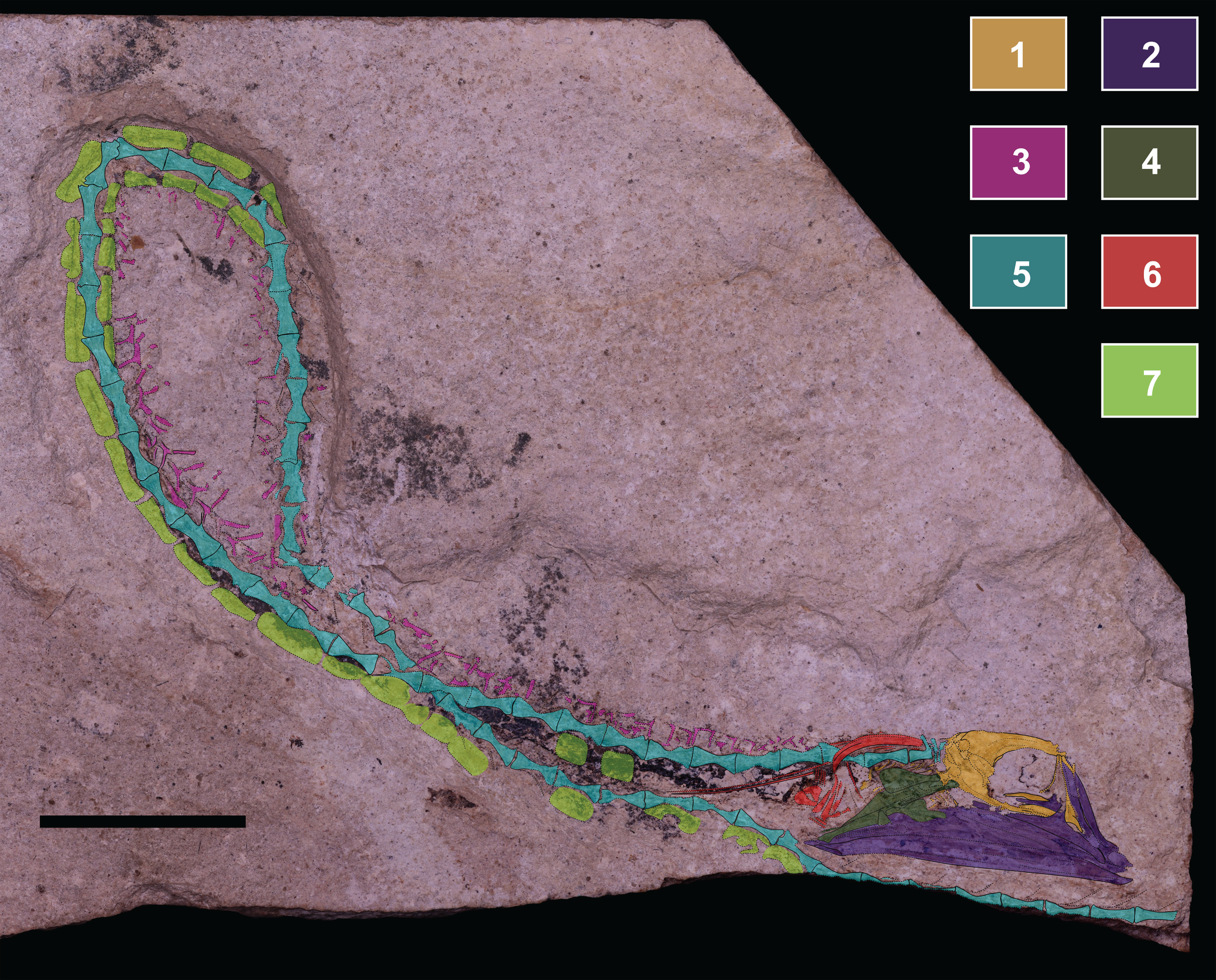
Parastylephorus anatoides holotype specimen, with color-coding added digitally

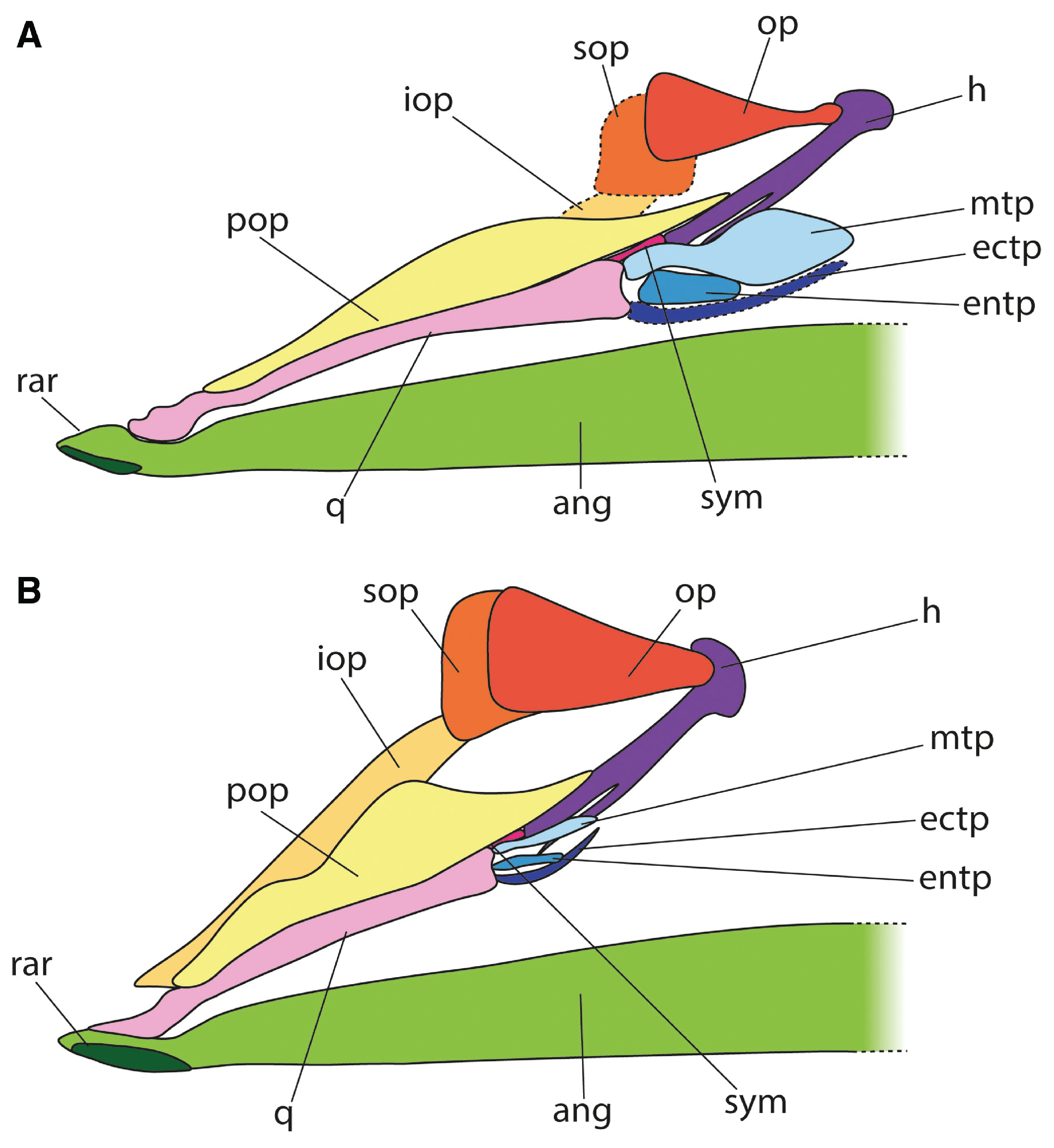
Comparison of the rear skull and jaw articulation region in Parastylephorus (top) and Stylephorus (bottom)

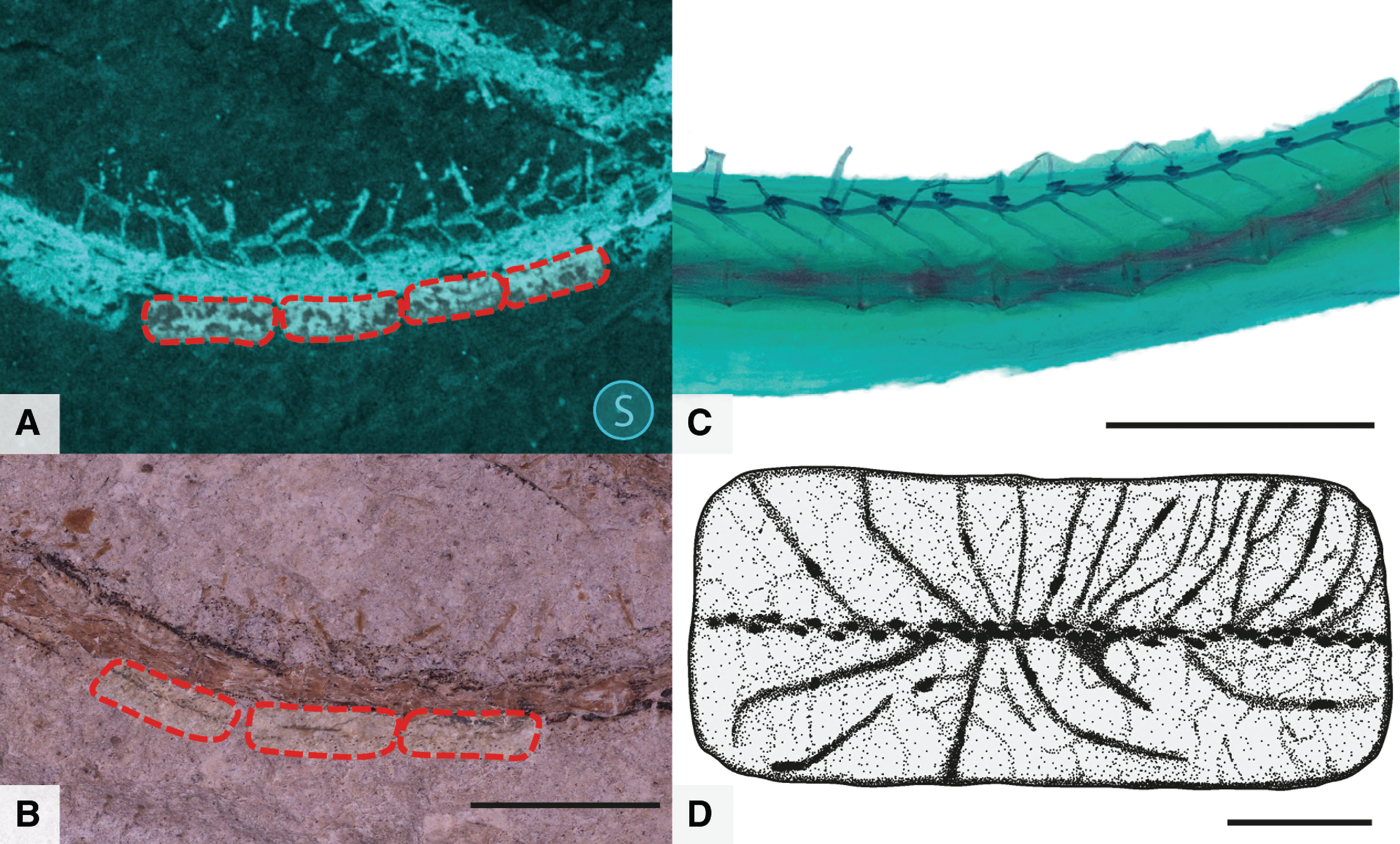
Lateral line scale anatomy of Parastylephorus (A, B, D) compared to the scaleless body of Stylephorus (C)

== Taxonomy ==
The cladogram below illustrates the position of Stylephoridae within the Gadiformes, in relation to other living neoteleosts:

- Neoteleostei
  - Ateleopodidae (jellynose fishes)
  - Eurypterygia
    - Aulopiformes (lizardfishes and allies)
    - Ctenosquamata
      - Myctophiformes (lanternfishes and blackchins)
      - Acanthomorpha
        - Acanthopterygii (including Percomorpha)
        - - Lampriformes (oarfish, opah, ribbonfish)
          - Paracanthopterygii
            - Percopsiformes (trout-perches and allies)
            - - Zeiformes (dories and allies)
              - Gadiformes
                - Stylephoridae (tube-eyes)
                - Gadoidei (cods and allies)
