= New Zealand dory =

Conservation status
- Least Concern (IUCN 3.1)

Scientific classification
- Kingdom: Animalia
- Phylum: Chordata
- Class: Actinopterygii
- Order: Zeiformes
- Family: Cyttidae
- Genus: Cyttus
- Species: C. novaezealandiae

Binomial name
- Cyttus novaezealandiae (Arthur, 1885)

Species of fish

The New Zealand dory (Cyttus novaezealandiae) is a dory, in the family Cyttidae, found around southern Australia, and New Zealand, over the continental shelf at depths of between 20 and 400 m. Its length is between 20 and 30 cm.

== Other references ==
- Froese, Rainer; Pauly, Daniel (eds.). "Cyttus novaezealandiae". FishBase. April 2006 version.
- Tony Ayling & Geoffrey Cox, Collins Guide to the Sea Fishes of New Zealand, (William Collins Publishers Ltd., Auckland, New Zealand 1982) ISBN 0-00-216987-8
