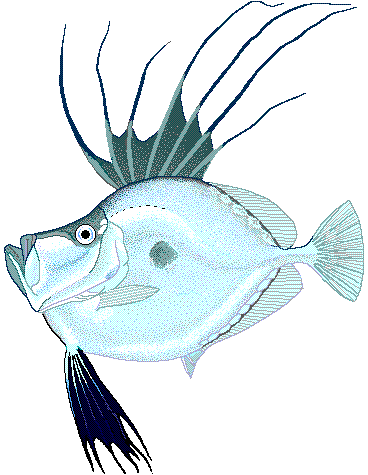
- Mirror Dory (Z. nebulosa)

Scientific classification
- Kingdom: Animalia
- Phylum: Chordata
- Class: Actinopterygii
- Division: Teleostei
- Order: Zeiformes
- Family: Zeidae
- Genus: Zenopsis; T. N. Gill, 1862

Synonyms
- †Cyttoides Wettstein, 1886

= Zenopsis =

Zenopsis Temporal range: Early Oligocene–present Possible Eocene record

Extant genus of fishes

Zenopsis is a genus of dories, a group of marine fish. There are five extant species, but the genus is also known from fossils dating back to the Oligocene epoch. They largely resemble the better-known John Dory, and are typically found in relatively deep water, below normal scuba diving depth.

== Species ==
There are currently five recognized recent species in this genus:

- Zenopsis conchifer (R. T. Lowe, 1852) (sometimes misspelled Z. conchifera) (Silvery John dory)
- Zenopsis nebulosa (Temminck & Schlegel, 1845) (mirror dory)
- Zenopsis oblongus Parin, 1989
- Zenopsis stabilispinosa Nakabo, D.J. Bray & Yamada, 2006
- Zenopsis filamentosa, Y Kai, F Tashiro, 2019

The following fossil species are also known:

- †Zenopsis clarus Daniltshenko, 1960 - Oligocene of North Caucasus, Russia
- †Zenopsis hoernesi (Gorjanović-Kramberger, 1891) - Oligocene of Slovenia
- †Zenopsis tyleri Baciu & Bannikov, 2001 - Oligocene of Romania

Morphological analysis suggests that the fossil genus †Cyttoides Wettstein, 1886 from the Early Oligocene-aged Matt Formation of Canton Glarus, Switzerland is in fact a specimen of Zenopsis, which would make it known as †"Zenopsis glaronensis" (Wettstein, 1886). However, this name is thought to be a nomen dubium, as the specimen cannot be properly assigned to a species due to its highly distorted nature. The modern king dory (Cyttus traversi) was briefly classified into the genus Cyttoides, but was reclassified back when that genus was found to be preoccupied by "C." glaronensis.

Another dubious species, †Zenopsis colchicus (Simonovich, 1875) (=Platax colchicus) from the Eocene of Georgia, is known only from illustrations of lost specimens and may be the earliest known record of the Zeidae. It closely resembles Zenopsis and may be the earliest record of it, but its identity remains uncertain without actual specimens.
