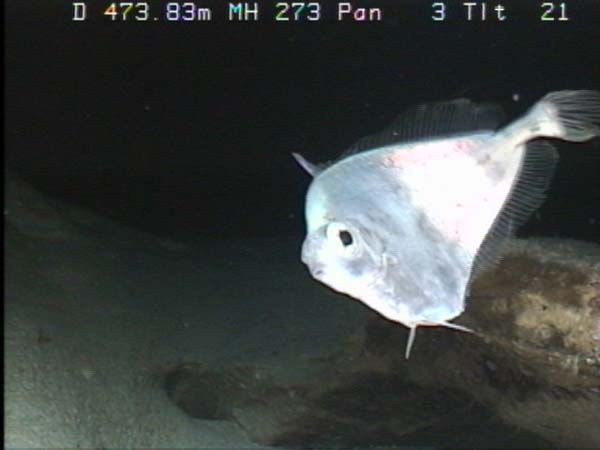

Conservation status
- Least Concern (IUCN 3.1)

Scientific classification
- Kingdom: Animalia
- Phylum: Chordata
- Class: Actinopterygii
- Order: Zeiformes
- Family: Grammicolepididae
- Subfamily: Grammicolepidinae
- Genus: Grammicolepis; Poey, 1873
- Species: G. brachiusculus

Binomial name
- Grammicolepis brachiusculus Poey, 1873

= Grammicolepis =

Species of fish

Grammicolepis is a monotypic genus of tinselfish, family Grammicolepididae. The only species is Grammicolepis brachiusculus, the thorny tinselfish or deepscale dory. It is found in deep oceanic waters at depths from 250 to 1,026 metres (820 to 3,366 ft), but usually between 500 and 700 m (1,600 and 2,300 ft). It is known from many areas off Australia and occasionally caught as by-catch. Records from northwest Europe include one specimen caught off Scotland in 2004 and one off County Kerry, Ireland in 2010.

== Description ==
This species grows to a length of 64 centimetres (25 in) TL. It is a silvery fish with a highly compressed deep body that is covered in vertically-elongated scales.
