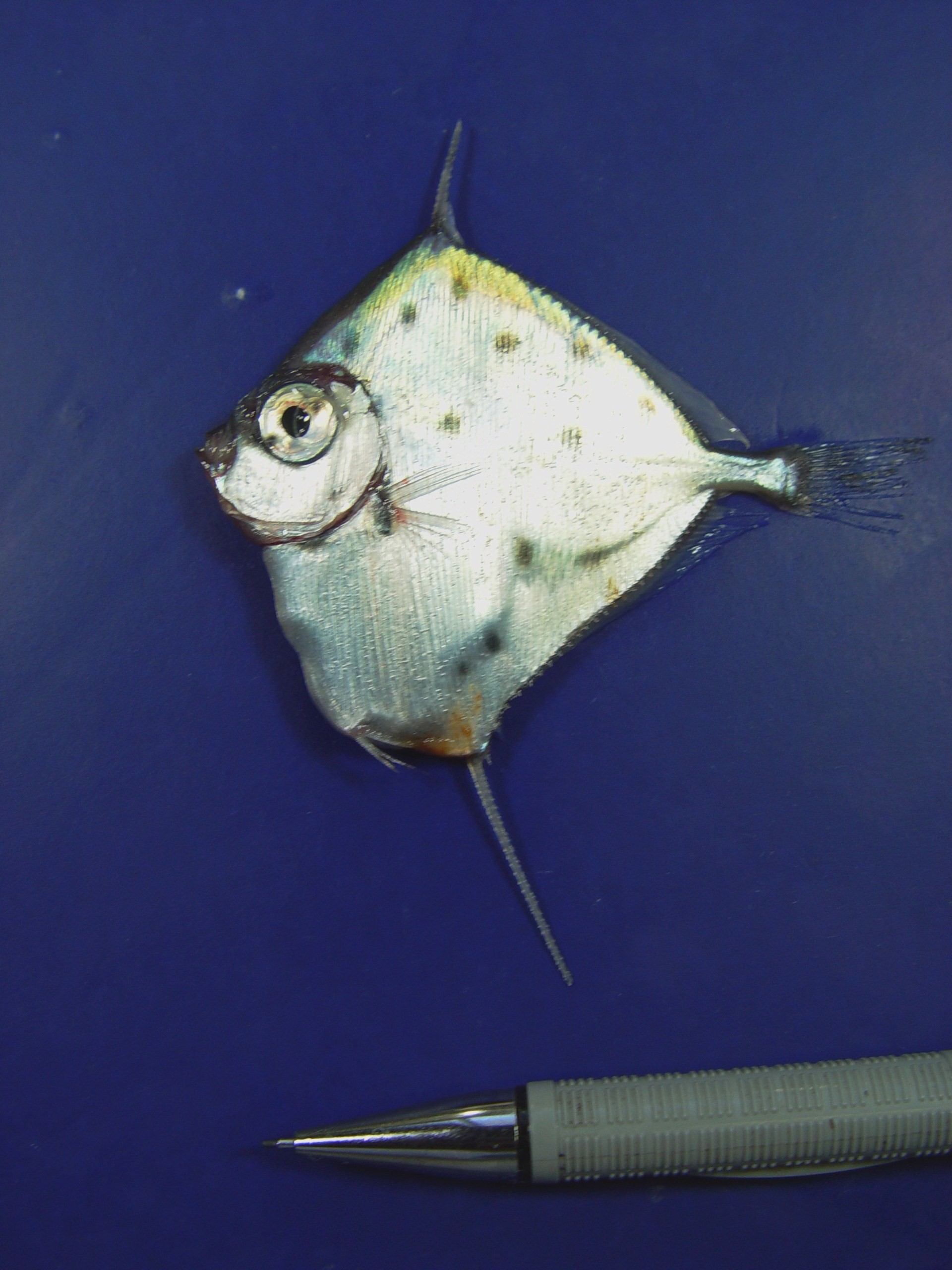

Conservation status
- Least Concern (IUCN 3.1)

Scientific classification
- Kingdom: Animalia
- Phylum: Chordata
- Class: Actinopterygii
- Order: Zeiformes
- Family: Grammicolepididae
- Subfamily: Grammicolepidinae
- Genus: Xenolepidichthys; Gilchrist, 1922
- Species: X. dalgleishi

Binomial name
- Xenolepidichthys dalgleishi Gilchrist, 1922

= Xenolepidichthys =

Species of fish

Xenolepidichthys is a monotypic genus of tinselfish, family Grammicolepididae. The only species is Xenolepidichthys dalgleishi, the spotted tinselfish. It is found in deep oceanic waters at depths from 128 to 885 metres (420 to 2,904 ft), but usually between 200 and 400 m (660 and 1,310 ft). This species grows to a length of 17.5 centimetres (6.9 in) TL.
