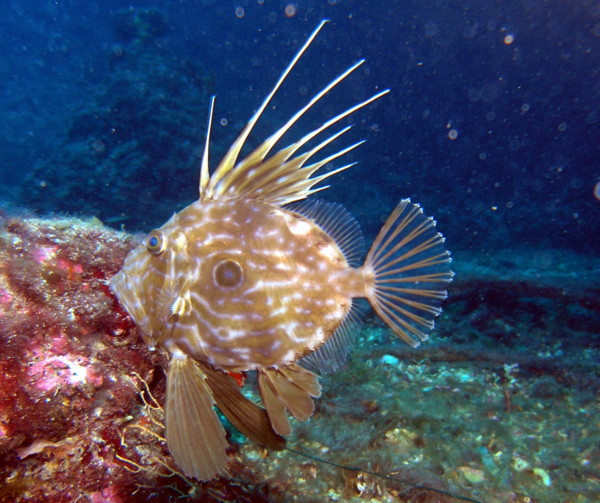
- John Dory (Z. faber)

Scientific classification
- Kingdom: Animalia
- Phylum: Chordata
- Class: Actinopterygii
- Division: Teleostei
- Order: Zeiformes
- Family: Zeidae
- Genus: Zeus; Linnaeus, 1758

= Zeus (fish) =

Zeus Temporal range: Early Oligocene–present

Genus of fishes

Zeus is a genus of fish in the family Zeidae.

The name Zeus comes from the Latin zaeus, from the Greek ζαίος (zaiós) "John dory", which according to Sven O. Kullander would have no relation with the name of the king of gods in Greek mythology. However, other authors dispute this, giving the fish the earlier name of Piscis jovii ("fish of Jove"), who was equated with Zeus.

== Species ==
There are currently two recognized species in this genus:

- Zeus capensis Valenciennes, 1835 (Cape dory)
- Zeus faber Linnaeus, 1758 (John dory)

The following fossil species are also known:

- †Zeus jerzmanskae Baciu, Bannikov & Tyler, 2005 (Oligocene of Poland)
- †Zeus primaevus Scarabelli, 1859 (Late Miocene of Italy & Algeria)
- †Zeus robustus Gorjanović-Kramberger, 1891 (Oligocene of Slovenia)
