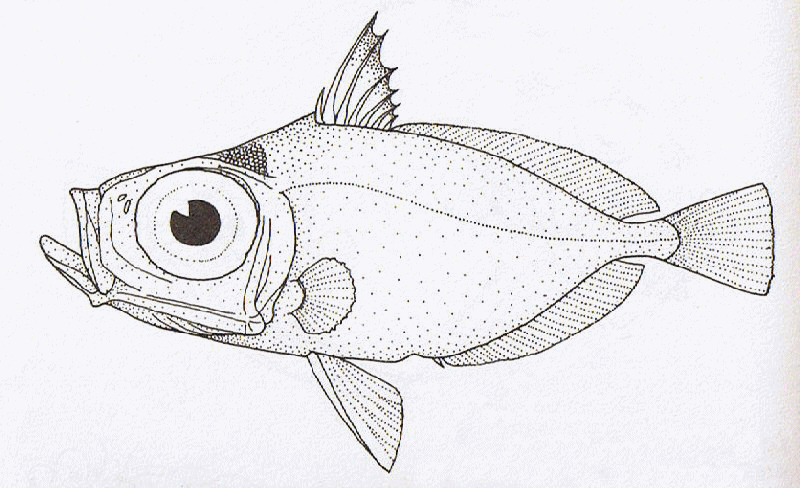
- Zenion leptolepis
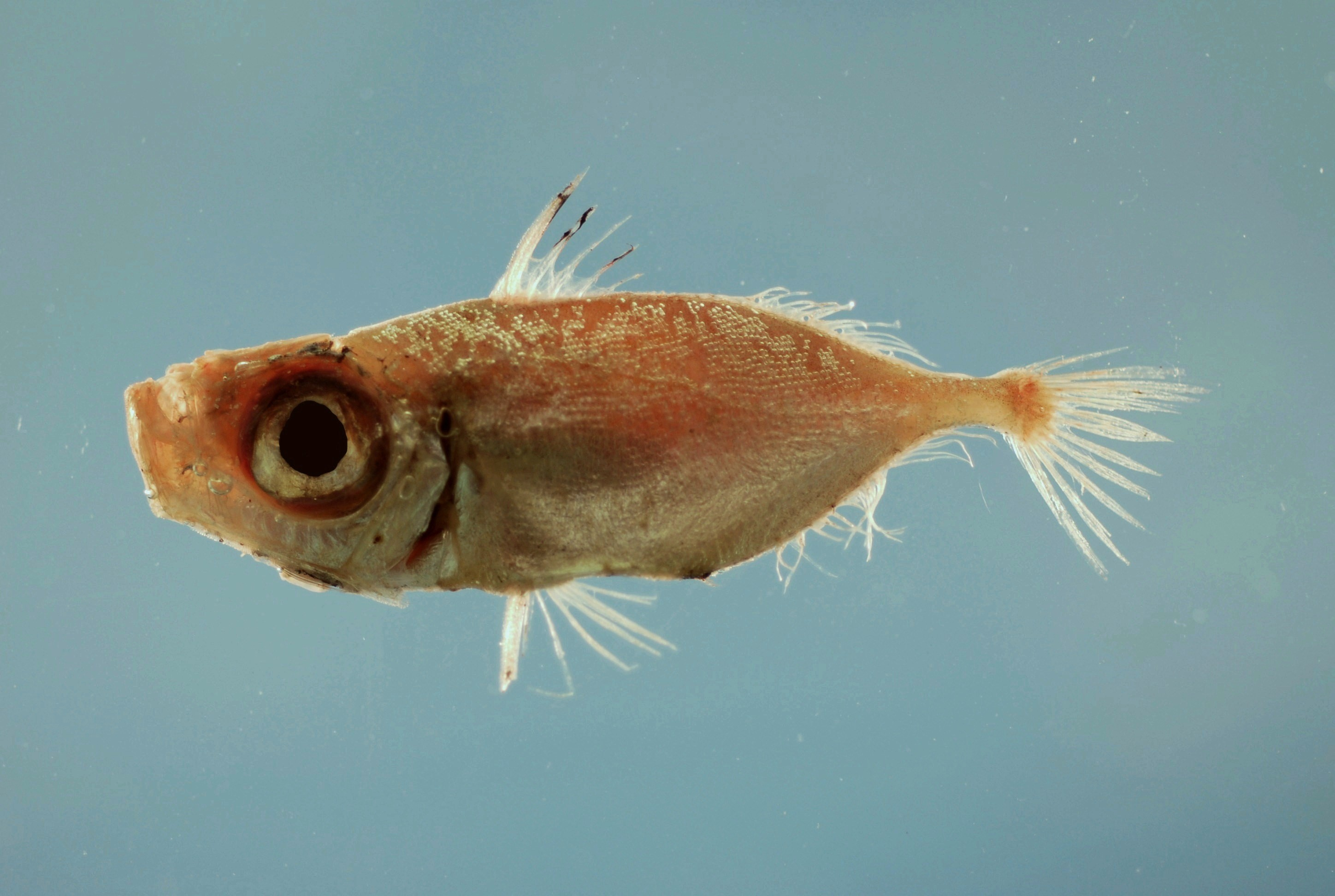
- Zenion hololepis

Scientific classification
- Kingdom: Animalia
- Phylum: Chordata
- Class: Actinopterygii
- Order: Zeiformes
- Family: Zeniontidae
- Genus: Zenion; D. S. Jordan & Evermann, 1896

= Zenion =

Zenion Temporal range: Pliocene to Present

Genus of fishes

Zenion is a genus of zeniontid fish that is known from the fossil record, but is still extant.

== Species ==
There are currently four recognized recent species in this genus:

- Zenion boops Lin, Chang, Han & Lin, 2025
- Zenion hololepis (Goode & T. H. Bean, 1896)
- Zenion japonicum Kamohara, 1934 (Japanese dory)
- Zenion leptolepis (Gilchrist & von Bonde, 1924) (elongate dory)
