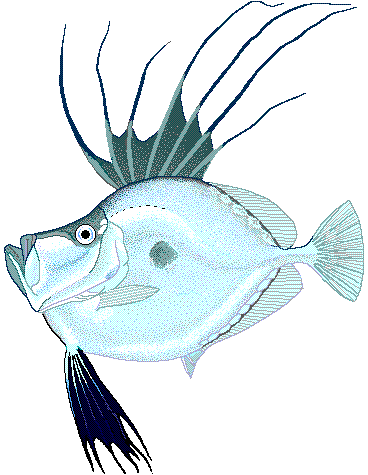

Scientific classification
- Kingdom: Animalia
- Phylum: Chordata
- Class: Actinopterygii
- Division: Teleostei
- Order: Zeiformes
- Family: Zeidae
- Genus: Zenopsis
- Species: Z. nebulosa

Binomial name
- Zenopsis nebulosa (Temminck & Schlegel, 1845)
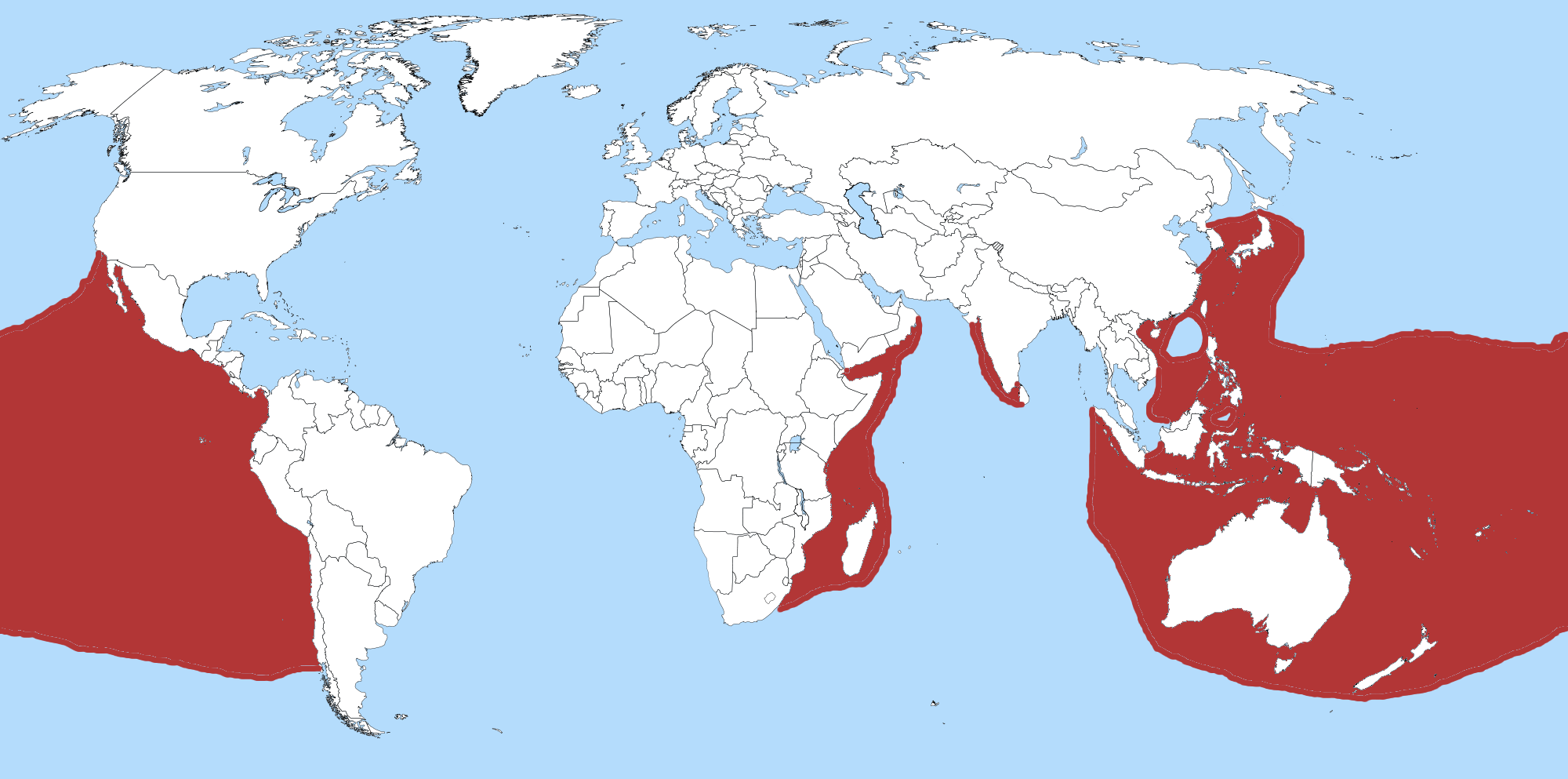
- Distribution of the mirror dory

= Mirror dory =

Species of fish

The mirror dory (Zenopsis nebulosa) is a dory of the family Zeidae, found in the southern Pacific Ocean at depths of between 30 and 800 m. More specifically, the Zenopsis nebulosa is found in locations such as New Zealand, southern Hokkaido, Japan, the Emperor Seamount, the eastern coast of Australia, and the southern coast of Australia. Its length is up to 70 cm.

The mirror dory has a high first dorsal fin containing 9 spiny rays, and about 27 soft rays in the second. The forward set of pelvic fin rays are very elongated. There are large flat spines on each side of the body at the base of the dorsal and anal fins.

The scaleless body is a uniform silver, so bright as to be almost mirror-like, with an indistinct dark patch in the middle of each flank.

In the month-long NORFANZ Expedition of 2003 which was examining the biodiversity of the seamounts and slopes of the Norfolk Ridge, 117 specimens averaging 1 kg (2.2 lb), were collected from four locations.
