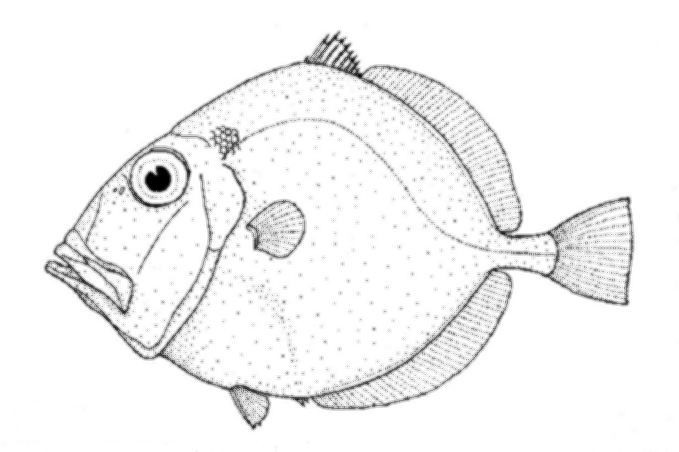
- Drawing by Dr Tony Ayling

Scientific classification
- Domain: Eukaryota
- Kingdom: Animalia
- Phylum: Chordata
- Class: Actinopterygii
- Order: Zeiformes
- Family: Cyttidae
- Genus: Cyttus
- Species: C. traversi

Binomial name
- Cyttus traversi F. W. Hutton, 1872
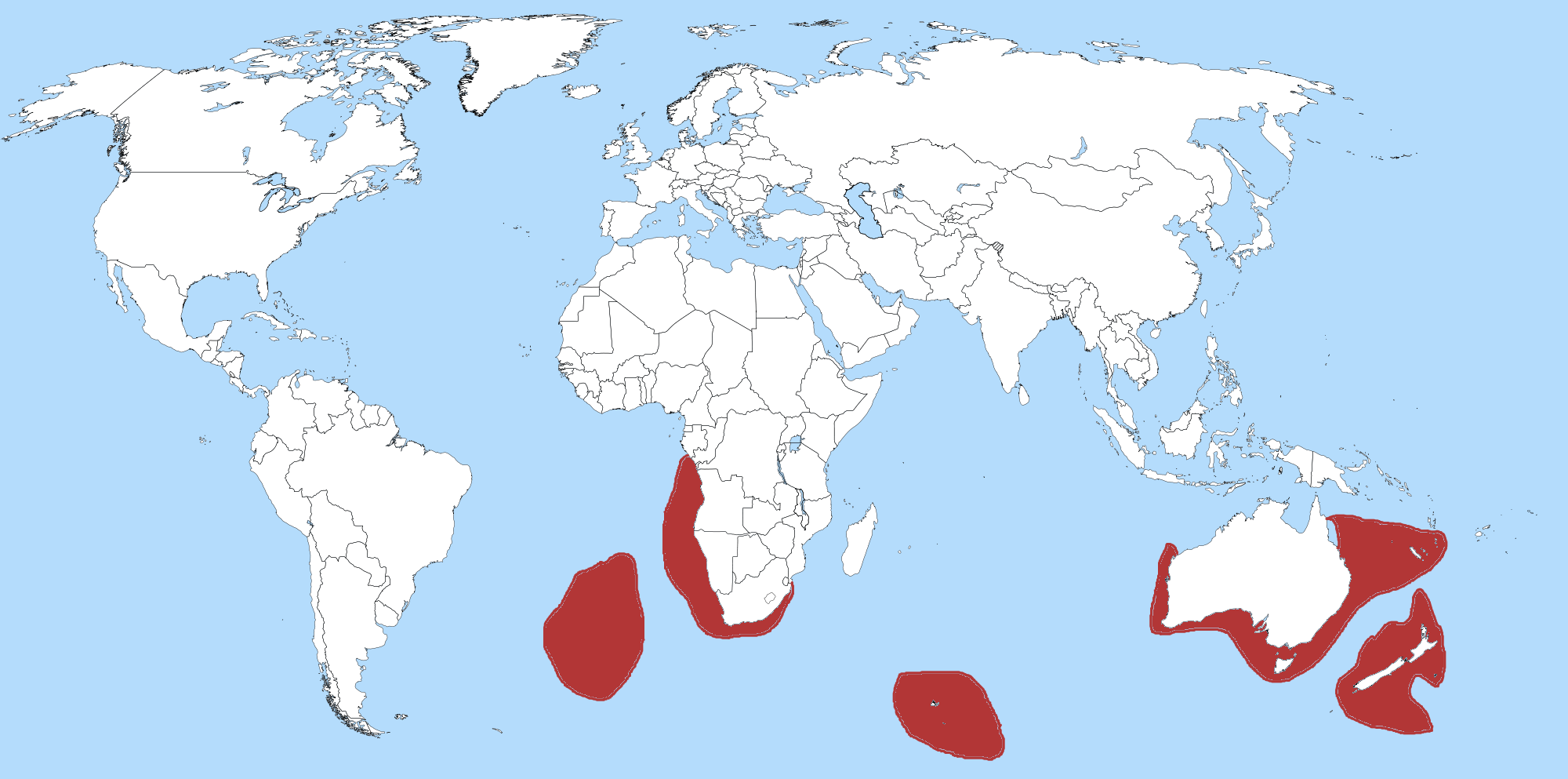
- Distribution of the King Dory

= King dory =

Species of fish

The king dory or lookdown dory (Cyttus traversi) is a Dory, in the genus Cyttus, found around South Africa, southern Australia, and New Zealand, over the continental shelf at depths of between 200 and 800 m. Its length is between 20 and 40 cm.

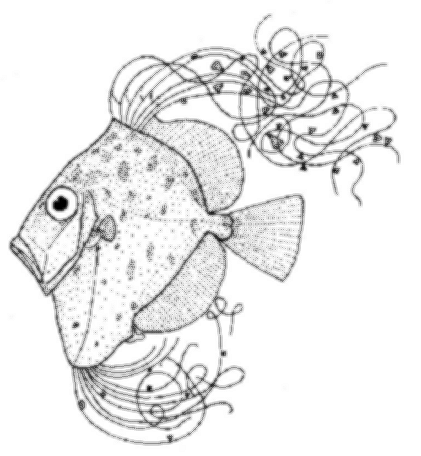
Juvenile king dory, Cyttus traversi
