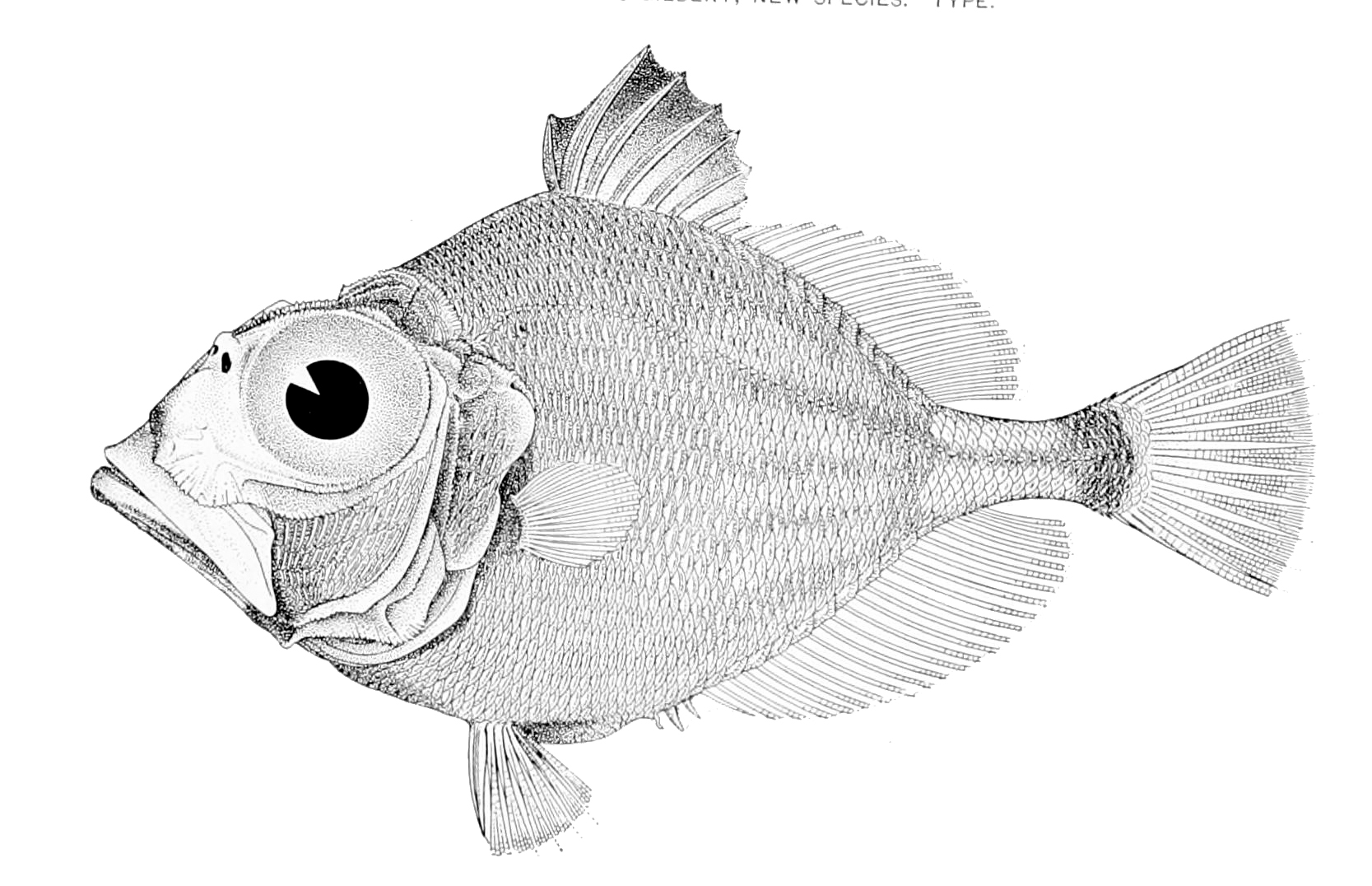
- Cyttomimus stelgis

Scientific classification
- Kingdom: Animalia
- Phylum: Chordata
- Class: Actinopterygii
- Order: Zeiformes
- Family: Zeniontidae
- Genus: Cyttomimus; C. H. Gilbert, 1905

= Cyttomimus =

Genus of fishes

Cyttomimus is a genus of zeniontid fishes native to the Pacific Ocean.

== Species ==
There are currently two recognized species in this genus:

- Cyttomimus affinis M. C. W. Weber, 1913 (false dory)
- Cyttomimus stelgis C. H. Gilbert, 1905
