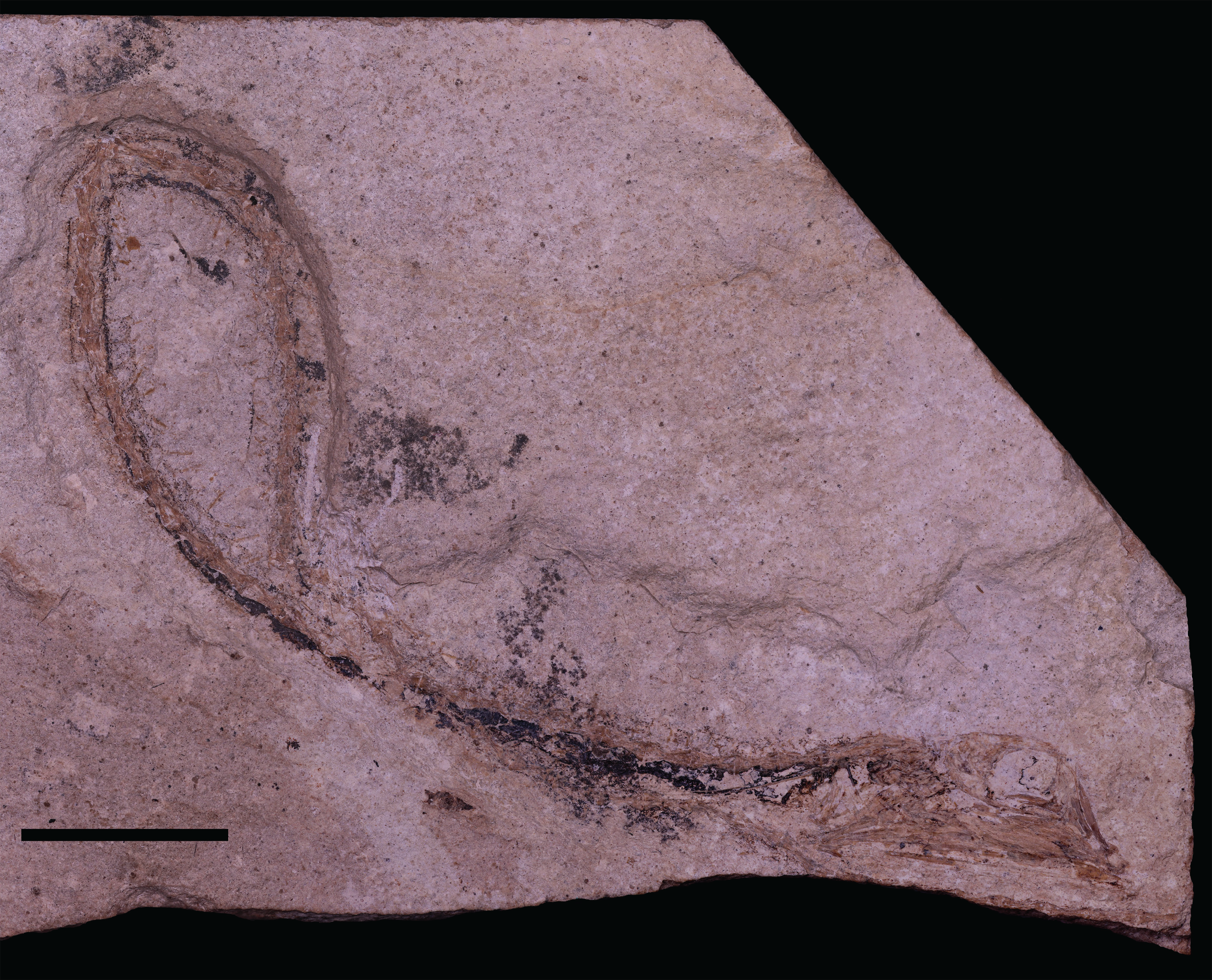
- Holotype specimen
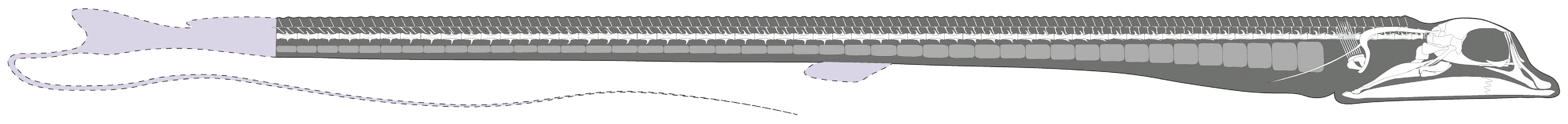
- Reconstructed skeleton

Scientific classification
- Kingdom: Animalia
- Phylum: Chordata
- Class: Actinopterygii
- Division: Teleostei
- Order: Gadiformes
- Family: Stylephoridae
- Genus: †Parastylephorus; Ridolfi et al., 2026
- Species: †P. anatoides

Binomial name
- †Parastylephorus anatoides Ridolfi et al., 2026

= Parastylephorus =

Parastylephorus Temporal range: Middle Eocene (Bartonian), ~40 Ma

Genus of extinct fish

Parastylephorus (lit. 'near Stylephorus') is an extinct genus of ray-finned fish in the family Stylephoridae, known from the Middle Eocene (Bartonian age) Pabdeh Formation of Iran. The genus contains a single species, Parastylephorus anatoides, known from a nearly complete, articulated skeleton. Before this species was described, the extant Stylephorus (the tube-eye) was the only described member of the Stylephoridae. As such, Parastylephorus represents the oldest—and only—fossil record of the family.

== Discovery and naming ==
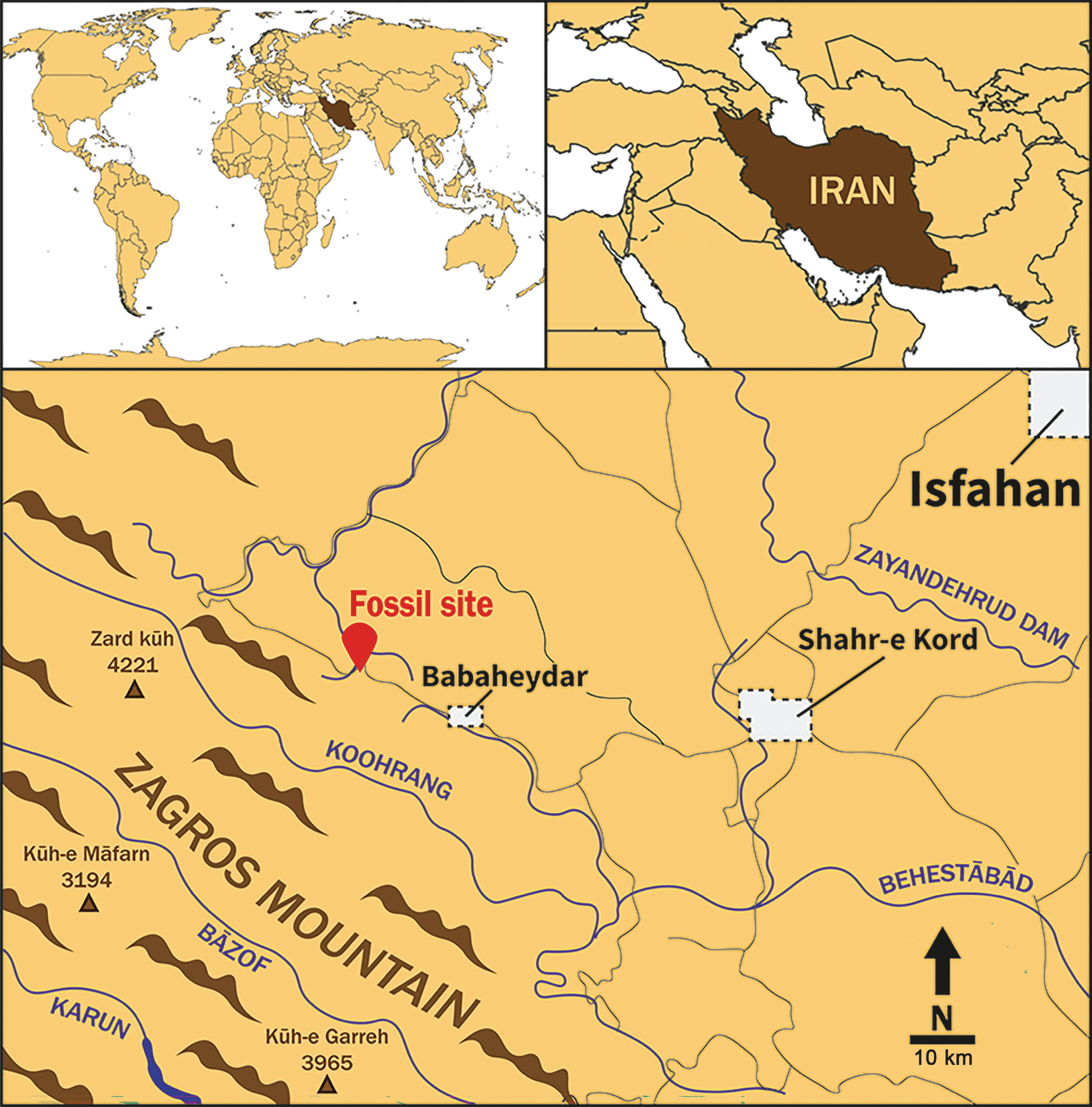
Type locality in the Zagros Mountains of Iran

The Parastylephorus fossil material was discovered in outcrops of the Pabdeh Formation in the Zagros Mountains near Babaheydar, Iran. The specimen is housed in the Department of Geology at the University of Isfahan, where it is permanently accessioned as specimen IUGM 100897. It consists of much of an articulated skeleton, preserved on a single slab. The caudal (tail) region is missing.

In 2026, Lorenzo Ridolfi and colleagues described Parastylephorus anatoides as a new genus and species of stylephorid fish based on these fossil remains, designating IUGM 100897 as the holotype specimen. The generic name, Parastylephorus, combines παρα- (para-), a Greek prefix meaning 'near', with Stylephorus, the genus name of the only other recognized stylephorid. The specific name, anatoides, combines Anas, the Latin word for ducks, with -ειδής (Latinized to -oides), a Greek suffix meaning 'having the form of' or 'resembling', referencing the superficial resemblance of their head shapes.

Parastylephorus is the first member of the family Stylephoridae to be described from the fossil record, making it the oldest member of this clade. It is also the second stylephorid species to be named (extinct or otherwise), as the extant Stylephorus had remained the only known member since its description in 1791.

== Description ==
The skeletal and integumentary anatomy of Parastylephorus is similar in many respects to Stylephorus, its closest relative and the only other known member of the family Stylephoridae. Like this taxon, Parastylephorus has an elongate, compressed body with a ribbon-like appearance. It is deepest toward the front, immediately after the head, before tapering toward the rear. The pectoral fin has eight rays, and the pelvic fin (and pelvic girdle) is absent. The dorsal fin extends along the dorsal (upper) surface of the body, made up of flexible rays of equal lengths. The tail is missing in the only known fossil, but the caudal fin likely ended with a pair of long filamentous rays, as in Stylephorus. Despite the missing parts of the vertebral column, with 63 vertebrae preserved, it still has more vertebrae than Stylephorus, which has 50–53. In contrast to Stylephorus, the body of which is effectively devoid of scales, Parastylephorus has a single row of delicate lateral-line scales extending along the entire length of the body on each side. These scales are more rectangular toward the front of the body, becoming more elongate, with slightly rounded corners, toward the rear.

As in Stylephorus, the skull of Parastylephorus exhibits many unusual features. The buccal apparatus (mouthparts for feeding) is especially unique, with extreme modifications for cranial kinesis allowing for rapid expansion of the buccal cavity for suction feeding. The upper and lower jaw bones are entirely edentulous (toothless), contrasting with Stylephorus, in which the premaxilla and dentary both have small teeth. The maxilla has a long, posteriorly directed alveolar process nearly reaching the midpoint of the orbit. This process is only weakly developed in Stylephorus. The lower jaws are extremely long, substantially exceeding the length of the neurocranium. The oral cavity was small, giving its mouth a pipette-like morphology. The bones comprising the suspensorium are not as reduced as they are in Stylephorus. The trend of decreasing the size of these bones—especially the mesopterygoid and metapteryoid—allows the buccal apparatus to fold more compactly. A feature tied to cranial kinesis in Stylephorus is the extreme reduction of the first two vertebral centra. This is seen in Parastylephorus, but to a less extreme degree. The eyes are not preserved in Parastylephorus, but they likely had the unique tubular morphology seen in Stylephorus that gives it the common name of 'tube-eye'.

The large number of shared features between Parastylephorus and Stylephorus, despite living 40 million years apart, indicates an unexpected degree of morphological stasis in this clade. This suggests the stylephorid body plan is successful in deep-sea environments, supported by the sustained stability of this region of the ocean.

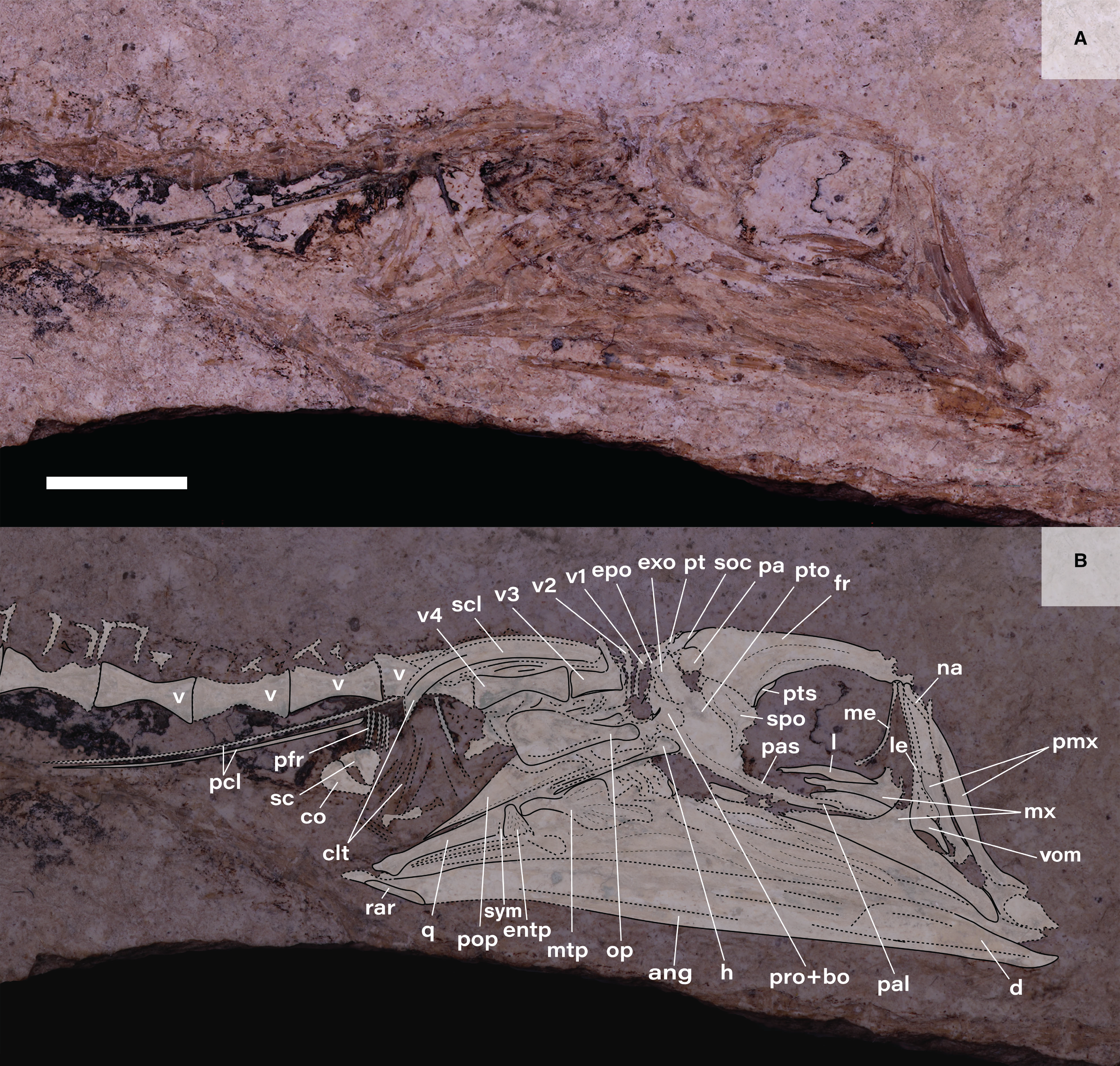
Skull region of the holotype

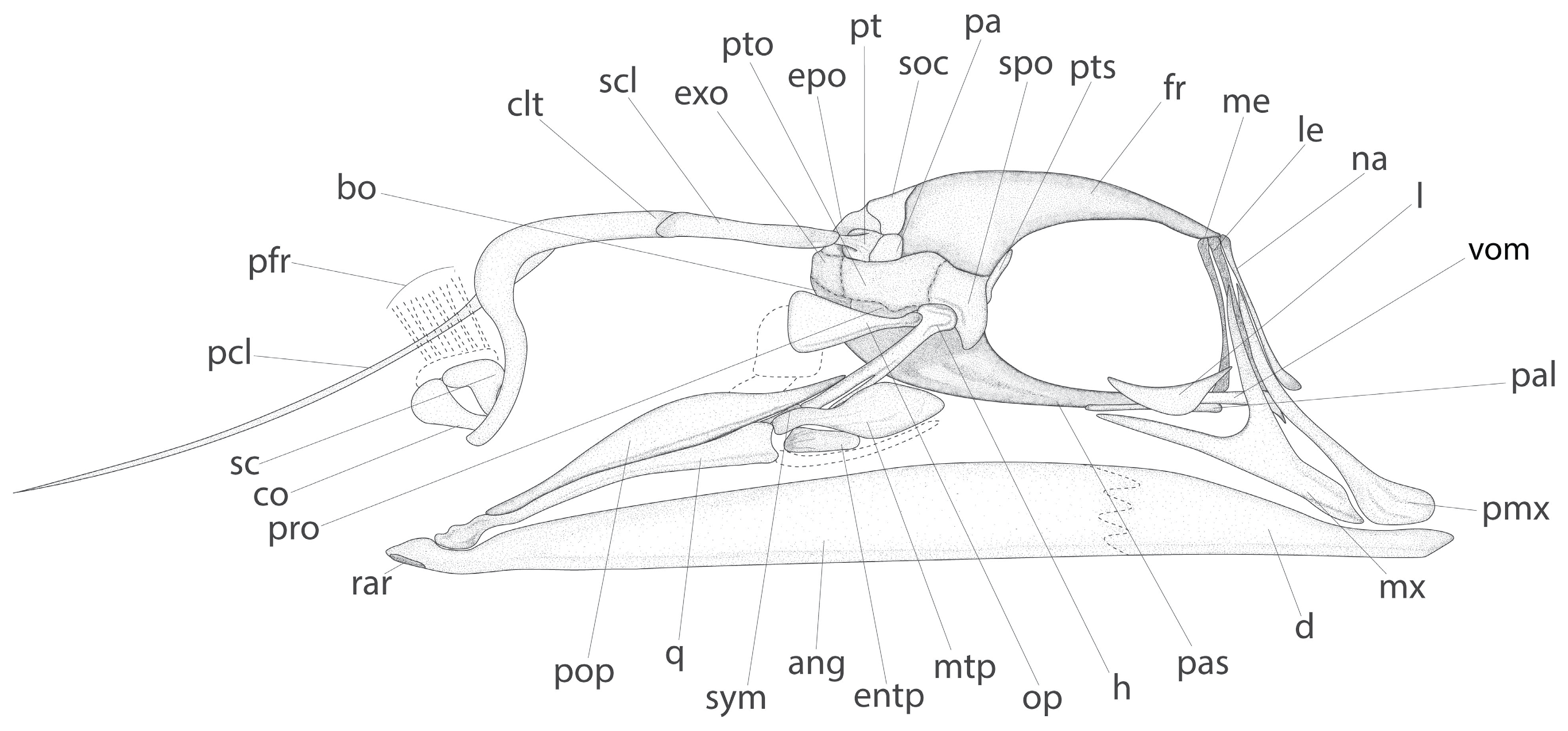
Reconstructed head

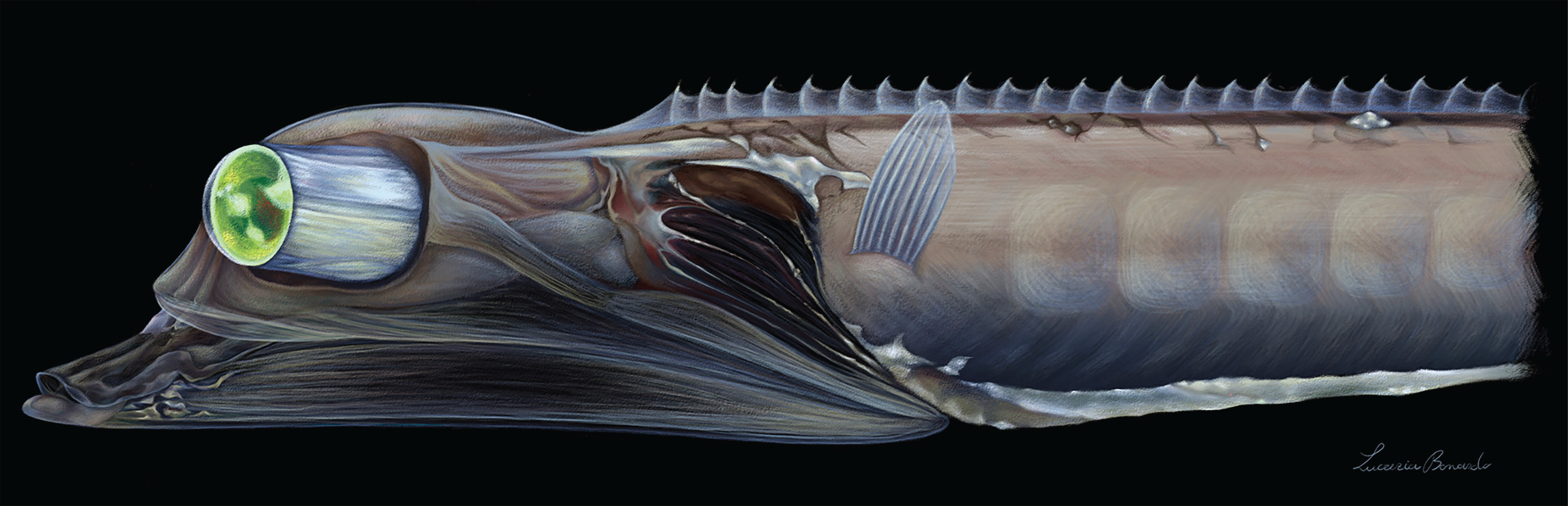
Life restoration of the head and front of the body
