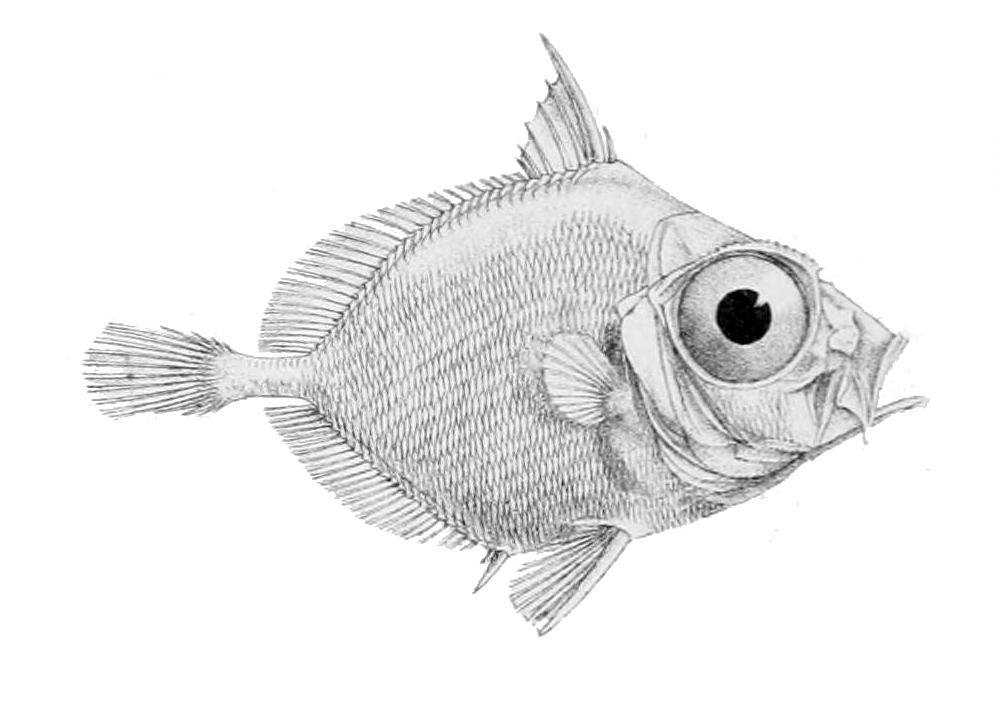
- Drawing by Dr Tony Ayling

Scientific classification
- Kingdom: Animalia
- Phylum: Chordata
- Class: Actinopterygii
- Order: Zeiformes
- Family: Zeniontidae
- Genus: Capromimus; T. N. Gill, 1893
- Species: C. abbreviatus

Binomial name
- Capromimus abbreviatus (Hector, 1875)

= Capromimus =

Species of fish

Capromimus abbreviatus, the capro dory, is a species of zeniontid fish and the only member of its genus. It is found only in waters around New Zealand at depths of between 87 and 500 metres (285 and 1,640 ft). The species reaches a total length (TL) of 10 centimetres (3.9 in)
