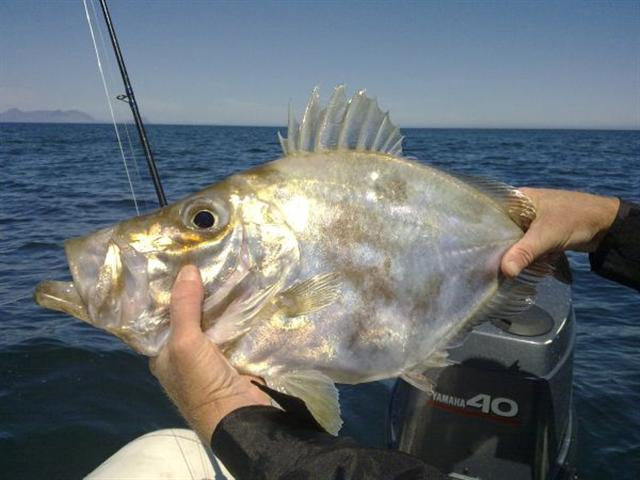
- In South Africa

Conservation status
- Least Concern (IUCN 3.1)

Scientific classification
- Kingdom: Animalia
- Phylum: Chordata
- Class: Actinopterygii
- Order: Zeiformes
- Family: Zeidae
- Genus: Zeus
- Species: Z. capensis

Binomial name
- Zeus capensis Valenciennes, 1835

= Cape dory =

Species of fish

The Cape dory (also spelled Cape Dory, or known as the Cape John Dory) (Zeus capensis) is a species of fish of the family Zeidae. It occurs on the coast of Namibia, South Africa, and Mozambique in South Atlantic and Western Indian Oceans. It is a demersal fish that lives at the depth 35–400 m. It can reach up to 90.0 cm in total length. They are silvery gray in color with indistinct disky spots.

It feeds on a variety of fish, cephalopods and crustaceans. It is often caught as by-catch in hake fisheries or in trawls. Because it is an excellent foodfish, it is often sold either fresh or frozen in markets.

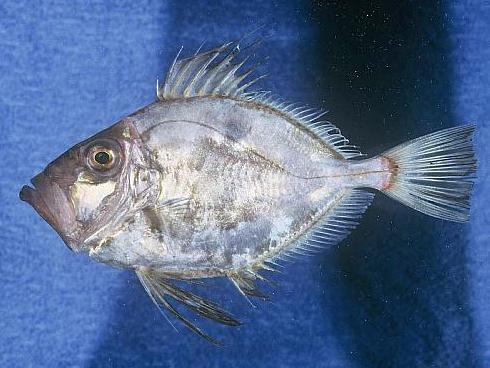
Zeus capensis collected in South Africa
