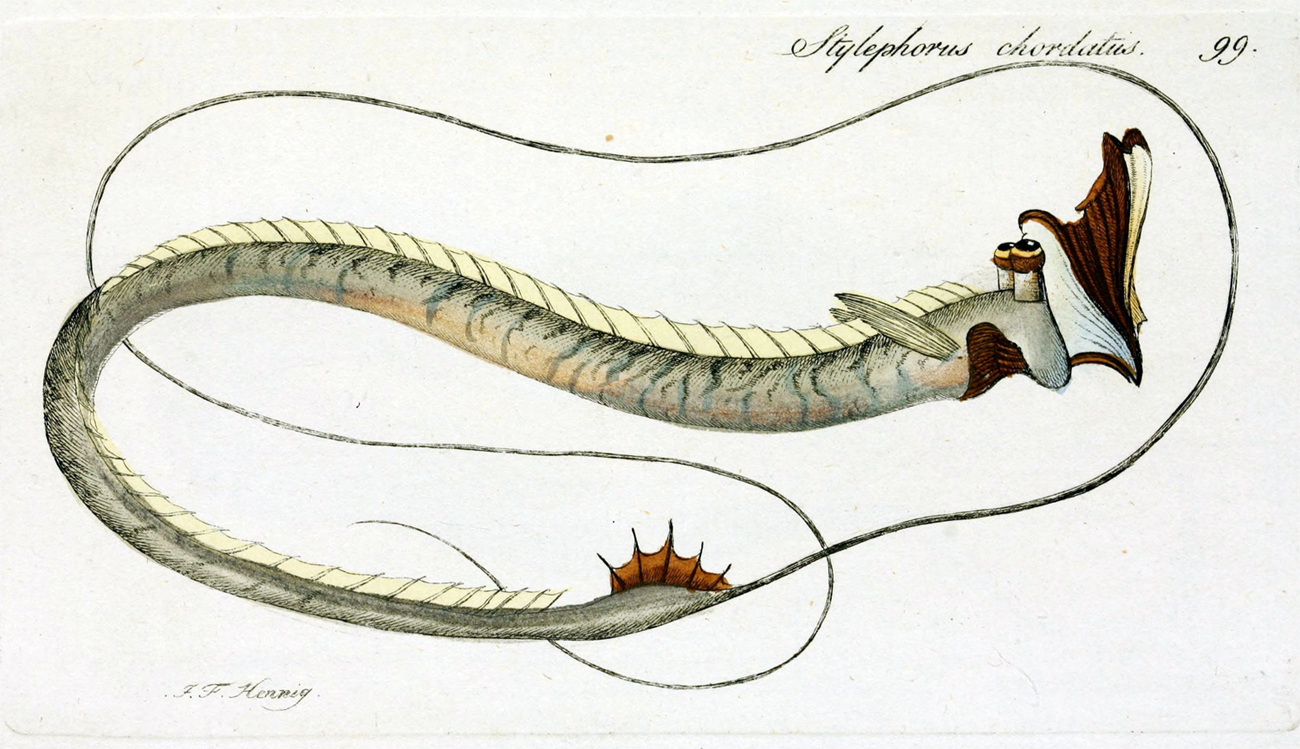

Conservation status
- Least Concern (IUCN 3.1)

Scientific classification
- Kingdom: Animalia
- Phylum: Chordata
- Class: Actinopterygii
- Division: Teleostei
- Order: Gadiformes
- Suborder: Stylephoroidei
- Family: Stylephoridae
- Genus: Stylephorus; G. Shaw, 1791
- Species: S. chordatus

Binomial name
- Stylephorus chordatus G. Shaw, 1791
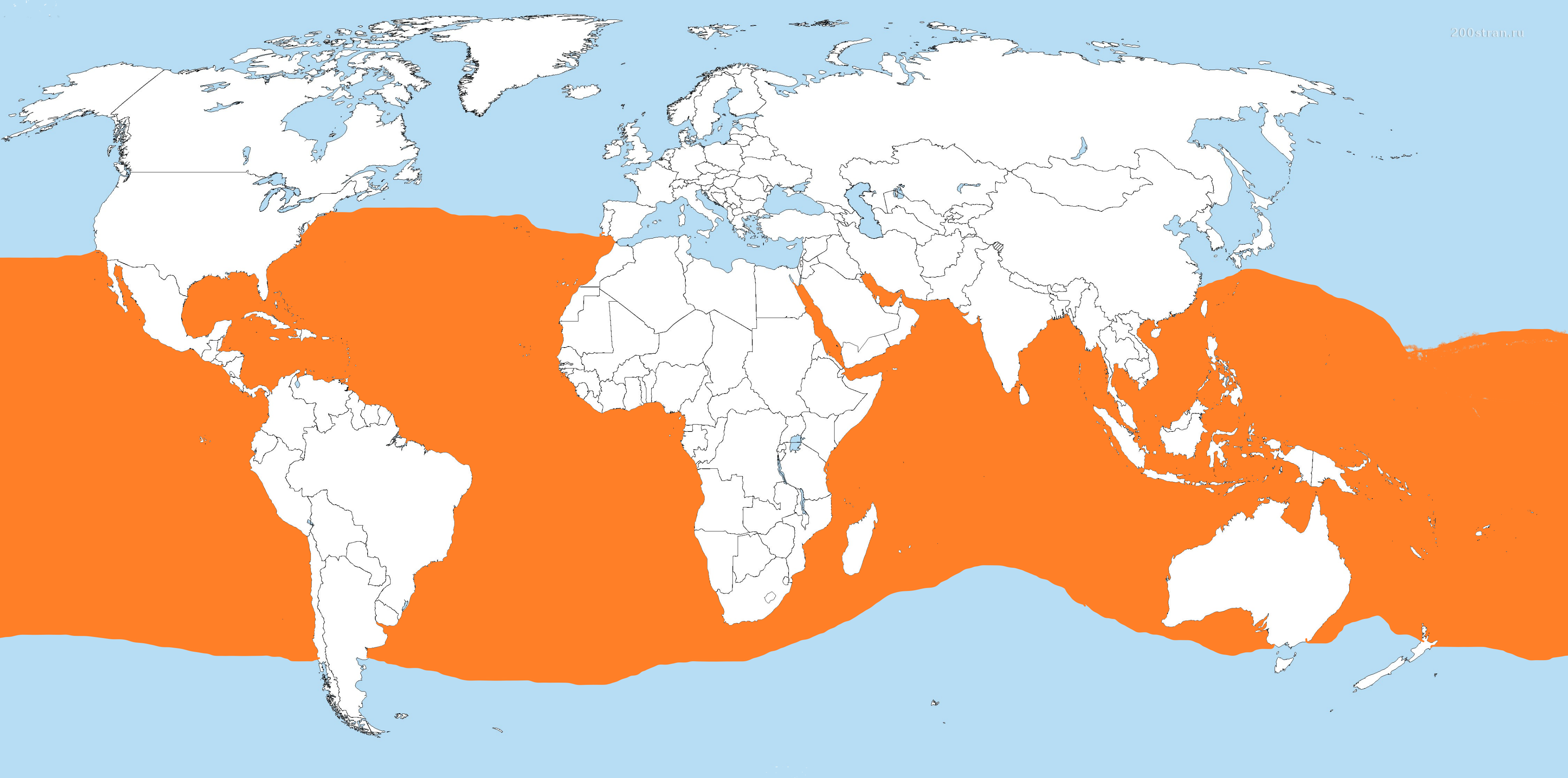

= Stylephorus =

Genus of ray-finned fishes

Stylephorus is a genus of deep-sea ray-finned fish. It contains a single species, Stylephorus chordatus, also called the tube-eye or thread-tail.

The phylogenetic position of the tube-eye has been controversial. It has been historically placed amongst Lampriformes, but more recent studies analyzing mitochondrial and nuclear DNA sequences indicate Stylephorus is instead a close relative of the order Gadiformes (cods and hakes). Formerly placed in its own order, Stylephoriformes, it is now considered the most basal member of the Gadiformes by Eschmeyer's Catalog of Fishes.

It is found in deep subtropical and tropical oceans around the world, living at depths during the day and making nightly vertical migrations to feed on plankton. It is an extremely elongated fish; although its body grows only to 28 cm (11 in) long, its pair of tail fin rays triple its length to about 90 cm (35 in). Its eyes are tubular in shape, resembling a pair of binoculars.

It has a tubular mouth through which it uses to suck seawater by enlarging its oral cavity to about 40 times its original size. It then expels the water through the gills, leaving behind the copepods on which it feeds.

The extinct Parastylephorus, known from the middle Eocene Pabdeh Formation of Iran, closely resembles Stylephorus but maintains some morphological differences. It has been estimated that the stylephorid lineage diverged from other gadiforms during the Campanian stage of the Late Cretaceous.
