= Palaeocyttus =

Palaeocyttus Temporal range: Cenomanian

Scientific classification
- Domain: Eukaryota
- Kingdom: Animalia
- Phylum: Chordata
- Class: Actinopterygii
- Order: Zeiformes
- Genus: †Palaeocyttus; Gaudant, 1978

Palaeocyttus is an extinct genus of prehistoric bony fish that lived during the Cenomanian.

== See also ==
- Prehistoric fish
- List of prehistoric bony fish
