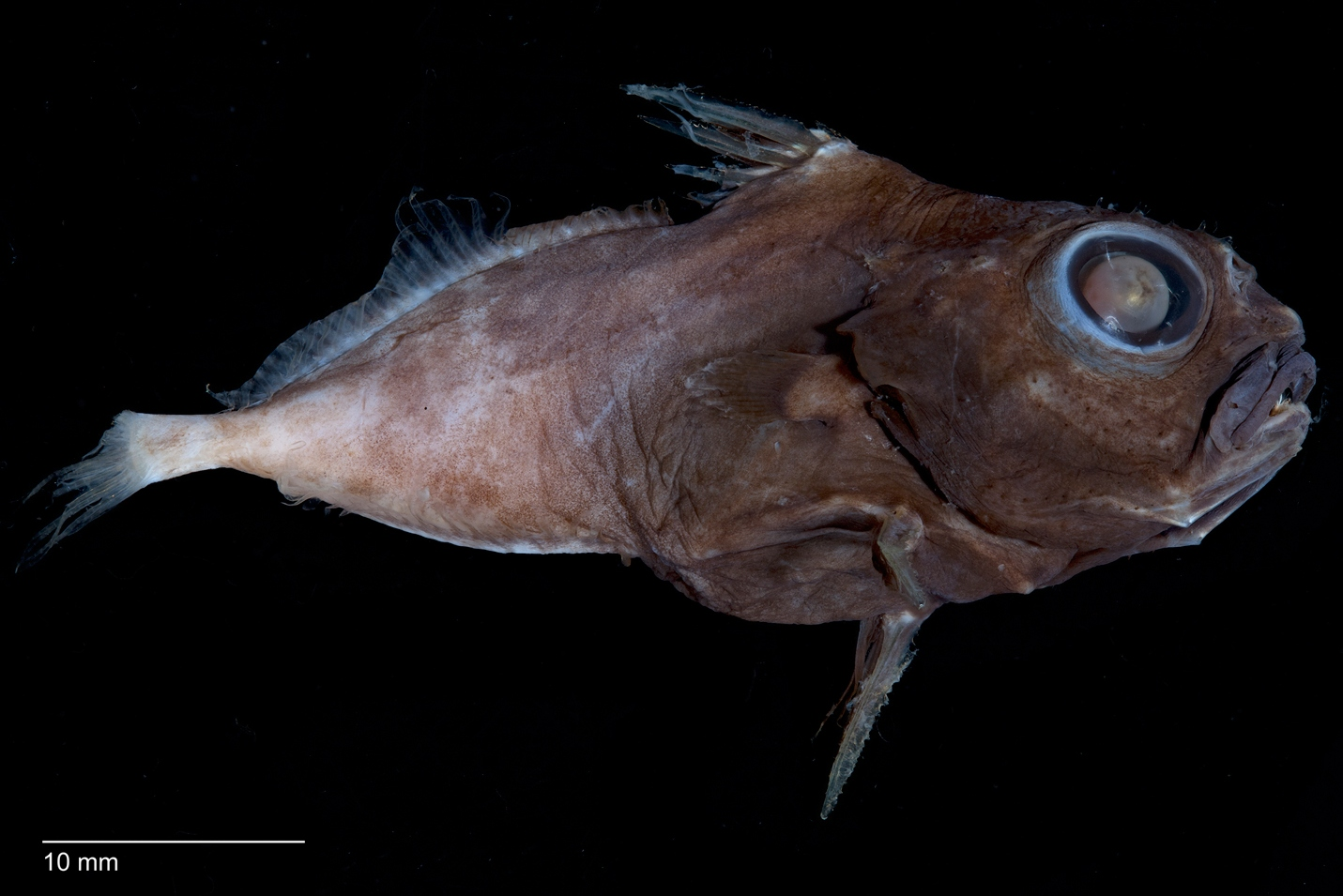

Scientific classification
- Kingdom: Animalia
- Phylum: Chordata
- Class: Actinopterygii
- Order: Zeiformes
- Family: Grammicolepididae
- Subfamily: Macrurocyttinae; Myers, 1960
- Genus: Macrurocyttus; Fowler, 1934
- Species: M. acanthopodus

Binomial name
- Macrurocyttus acanthopodus Fowler, 1934

= Macrurocyttus =

Species of fish

Macrurocyttus is a monotypic genus of tinselfish, family Grammicolepididae. The only species is Macrurocyttus acanthopodus, the dwarf dory. It is native to the western Pacific Ocean where it has been found in the deep waters around the Philippines and Australia on the continental slope at depths at around 878 to 1,190 metres (2,881 to 3,904 ft). It is dark brown species with a relatively shallow body and large eyes. Pelvic fins have a single, large serrated spine. It is scaleless. It can grow to 4.5 cm (1.8 in) standard length.
