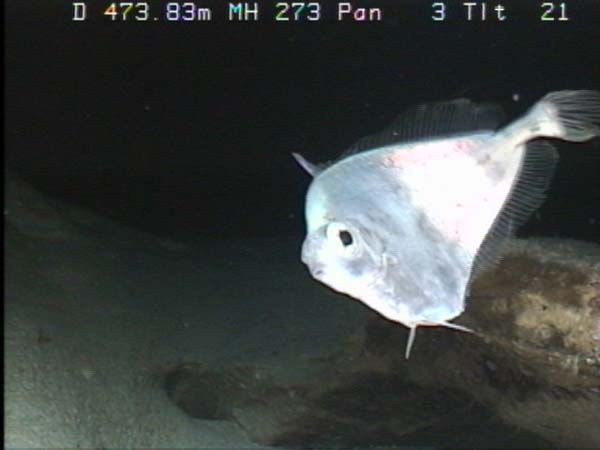
- Thorny tinselfish, Grammicolepis brachiusculus, filmed by the NOAA Ocean Explorer at Northampton Seamounts, 40 miles (65 km) southwest of Laysan, Hawaii.

Scientific classification
- Kingdom: Animalia
- Phylum: Chordata
- Class: Actinopterygii
- Order: Zeiformes
- Family: Grammicolepididae; Poey, 1873

Subfamilies and genera
- Subfamily Grammicolepidinae; Grammicolepis; Xenolepidichthys; Subfamily Macrurocyttinae; Macrurocyttus

= Tinselfish =

Family of ray-finned fishes

The Grammicolepididae are a small family of deep-sea ray-finned fishes in the order Zeiformes. They are called tinselfishes due to their silvery color. They are found near the bottom on the continental slope in the tropical and temperate regions of the Atlantic, Indian and western-central Pacific Oceans. They are of no commercial interest but are sometimes caught in trawls.

== Genera and species ==
The family consists of three species in as many genera in two subfamilies:

Subfamily Grammicolepidinae

- Grammicolepis
  - Grammicolepis brachiusculus Poey, 1873
- Xenolepidichthys
  - Xenolepidichthys dalgleishi Gilchrist 1922

Subfamily Macrurocyttinae

- Macrurocyttus
  - Macrurocyttus acanthopodus Fowler, 1934

== Phylogeny ==
Molecular data not including Macrurocyttus suggest that Grammicolepididae is a monophyletic group, but without robust identification of its sister group. Morphological data including Macrurocyttus suggest that the family is polyphyletic, with Macrurocyttus representing a clade distant from Grammicolepis+Xenolepidichthys.

== Description ==
The largest species, the thorny tinselfish, Grammicolepis brachiusculus, grows up to 64 cm (25 in) long. Grammicolepis and Xenolepidichthys are silvery fishers with deep and compressed bodies. They have unique, vertically elongate scales. Macrurocyttus are dark brown to black, without scales, and smaller, to 10 cm (3.9 in). They have extremely large eyes and one large serrated spine in the pelvic fins.
