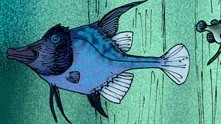
- Life restoration

Scientific classification
- Kingdom: Animalia
- Phylum: Chordata
- Class: Actinopterygii
- Division: Teleostei
- Order: Zeiformes
- Family: †Cretazeidae; Tyler, Bronzi & Ghiandoni, 2000
- Genus: †Cretazeus; Tyler, Bronzi & Ghiandoni, 2000
- Species: †C. rinaldii

Binomial name
- †Cretazeus rinaldii Tyler, Bronzi & Ghiandoni, 2000

= Cretazeus =

Cretazeus Temporal range: Late Campanian/Early Maastrichtian

Extinct genus of fishes

Cretazeus is an extinct genus of marine zeiform fish from the Late Cretaceous. It contains a single species, Cretazeus rinaldii from the late Campanian or early Maastrichtian age of Nardò, Italy. It is the oldest known zeiform fish, and is alternatively considered the only member of the family Cretazeidae or the most basal member of the family Parazenidae.

Uniquely, despite its age, Cretazeus is considered a derived zeiform nested within the order's crown group, as the sister to the Parazenidae; many other lineages of both extant and fossil zeiforms are more basal than Cretazeus, despite only appearing later in the geological record. This suggests that several lineages of zeiforms were present during the Late Cretaceous and survived the Cretaceous–Paleogene extinction, with several surviving to the present day, despite this not being preserved in the fossil record.
