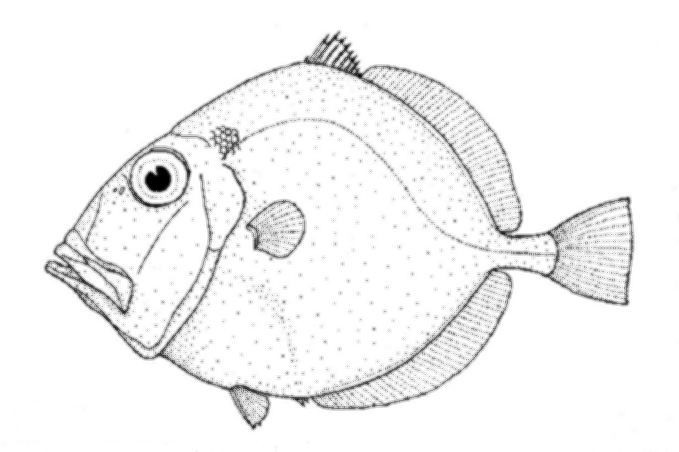
- King dory Cyttus traversi Drawing by Dr Tony Ayling

Scientific classification
- Kingdom: Animalia
- Phylum: Chordata
- Class: Actinopterygii
- Order: Zeiformes
- Family: Cyttidae; T. N. Gill, 1893
- Genus: Cyttus; Günther, 1860

= Cyttus =

Genus of fishes

Cyttus is the sole genus in the family Cyttidae a family of large, showy, deep-bodied zeiform marine fish. Members of this genus are found in the Atlantic, Indian, and Pacific Ocean.

An apparent extinct relative, Cyttoides, was originally recognized from the Early Oligocene of Canton Glarus, Switzerland. However, more recent studies have found it to actually represent an indeterminate species of Zenopsis. The king dory was occasionally placed in the distinct genus Cyttoides, which is now known to have been preoccupied by the fossil fish.

== Species ==
There are currently three recognized species in this genus:

- Cyttus australis (J. Richardson, 1843) (silver dory)
- Cyttus novaezealandiae (Arthur, 1885) (New Zealand dory)
- Cyttus traversi F. W. Hutton, 1872 (king dory)
