= John Dory (song) =

Traditional ballad

John Dory (Roud 249, Child 284) is an English-language folk song. The fish John Dory may be named for the titular character. The song is sometimes sung as a three-part round. The first printing of the tune and text is 1609 in Thomas Ravenscroft's Deuteromelia songbook but there are earlier mentions of the song in books. It was quite popular, and both parodies and satires were written to the same melody.

== Synopsis ==
John Dory, a ship's captain (perhaps a pirate, likely French) appeals to the king of France for a pardon, promising to bring him captive Englishmen. The first ship John Dory meets is a "good black bark" with "50 oars on a side" owned by Nicholl, a Cornish man. After a battle, John Dory is captured.

The king mentioned in the song ("good King John of France") might well be John II of France (1319–1364) who was known as "John the Good".

== See also ==
- List of the Child Ballads
