= List of fishes known as dory =

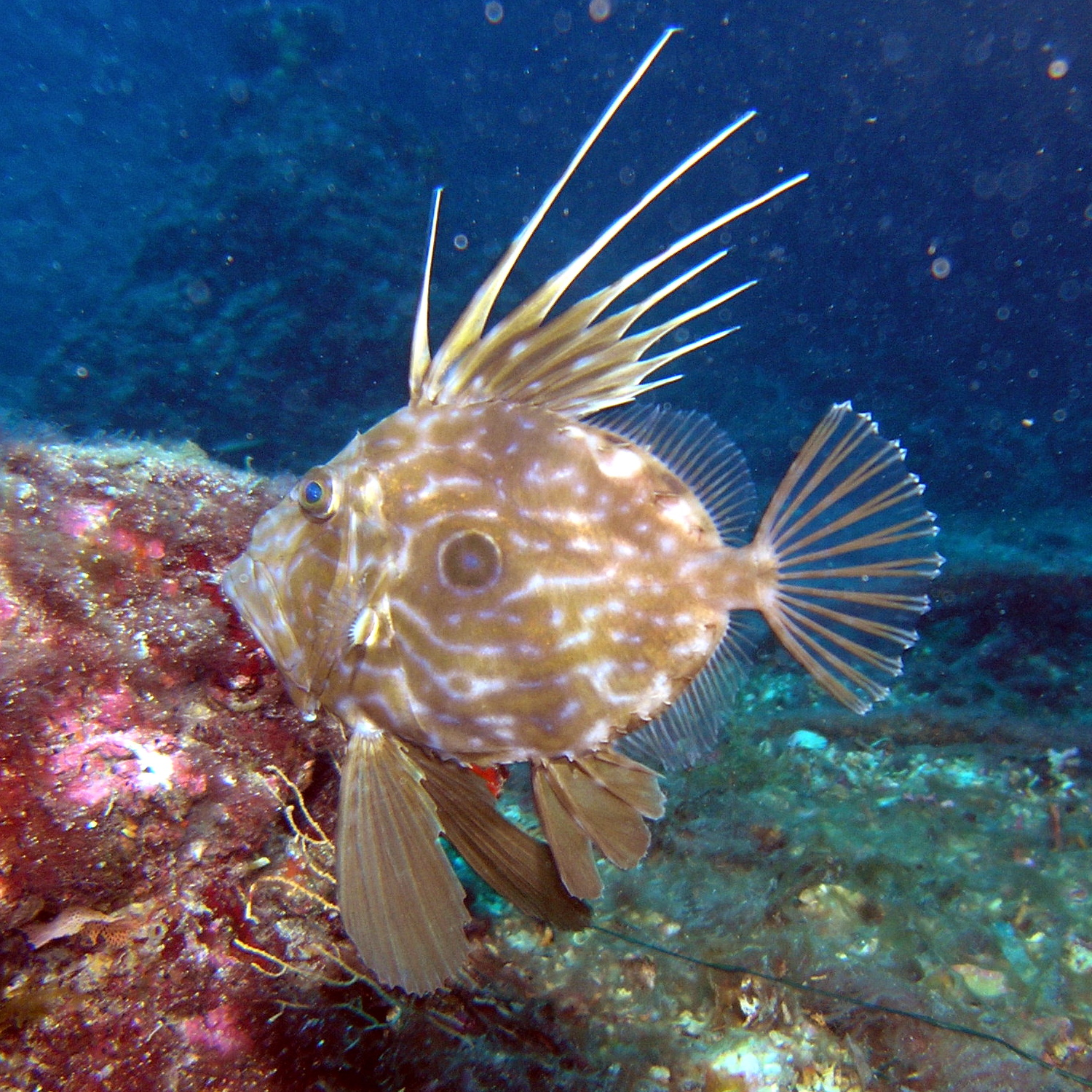
The John Dory is an example of a fish known as a Dory

The common name dory (from the Middle English dorre, from the Middle French doree, lit. 'gilded one') is shared (officially and colloquially) by members of several different families of large-eyed, silvery, deep-bodied, laterally compressed, and roughly discoid marine fish. As well as resembling each other, dories are also similar in habit: most are deep-sea and demersal. Additionally, many species support commercial fisheries as food fish. Most dory families belong to the order Zeiformes, suborder Zeioidei:

- The "true dories", family Zeidae (five species, including the well-known John Dory)
- The zeniontids, family Zenionidae or Zeniontidae (seven species)
- The "Australian dories", family Cyttidae (three species all within the genus Cyttus)
- The oreos, family Oreosomatidae (ten species)
- The parazen family, Parazenidae (four species, including the rosy dory)

Additionally, several species of spinyfin (family Diretmidae, order Beryciformes) have been given the name dory by fishmongers.

In British English, the name is sometimes used for the walleye (Sander vitreus, synonym Stizostedion vitreum) – and the walleye's common name in French is the phonetically similar doré – meaning golden or gilded.

In parts of Southeast Asia, fillets of shark catfish (ex. Pangasius) are marketed as cream dory, Pangasius dory, Pacific dory, or simply dory.

== See also ==
- List of fish common names
- Dory (disambiguation)
