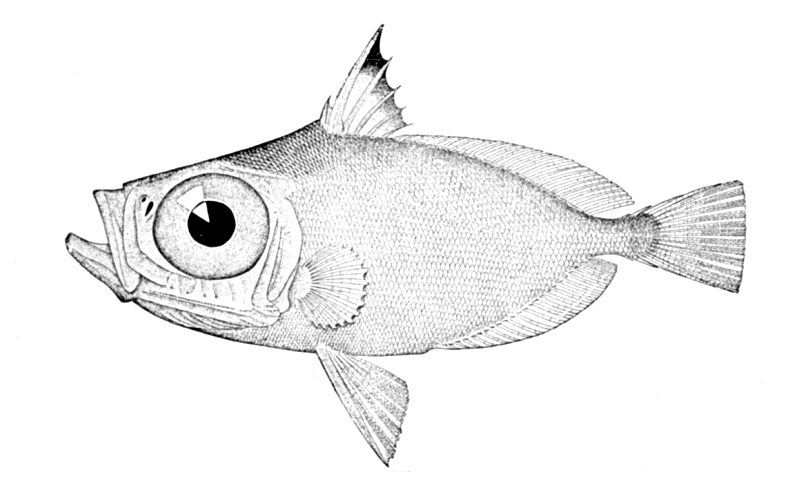
- Zenion hololepis

Scientific classification
- Kingdom: Animalia
- Phylum: Chordata
- Class: Actinopterygii
- Order: Zeiformes
- Family: Zeniontidae; G. S. Myers, 1960

Genera
- Capromimus; Cyttomimus; Zenion

= Zeniontidae =

Family of ray-finned fishes

Zeniontidae is a family of large, showy, deep-bodied zeiform marine fish. Found in the Atlantic, Indian, and Pacific Ocean, the family contains just seven species in three genera.

The family was formerly known as Macrurocyttidae.
