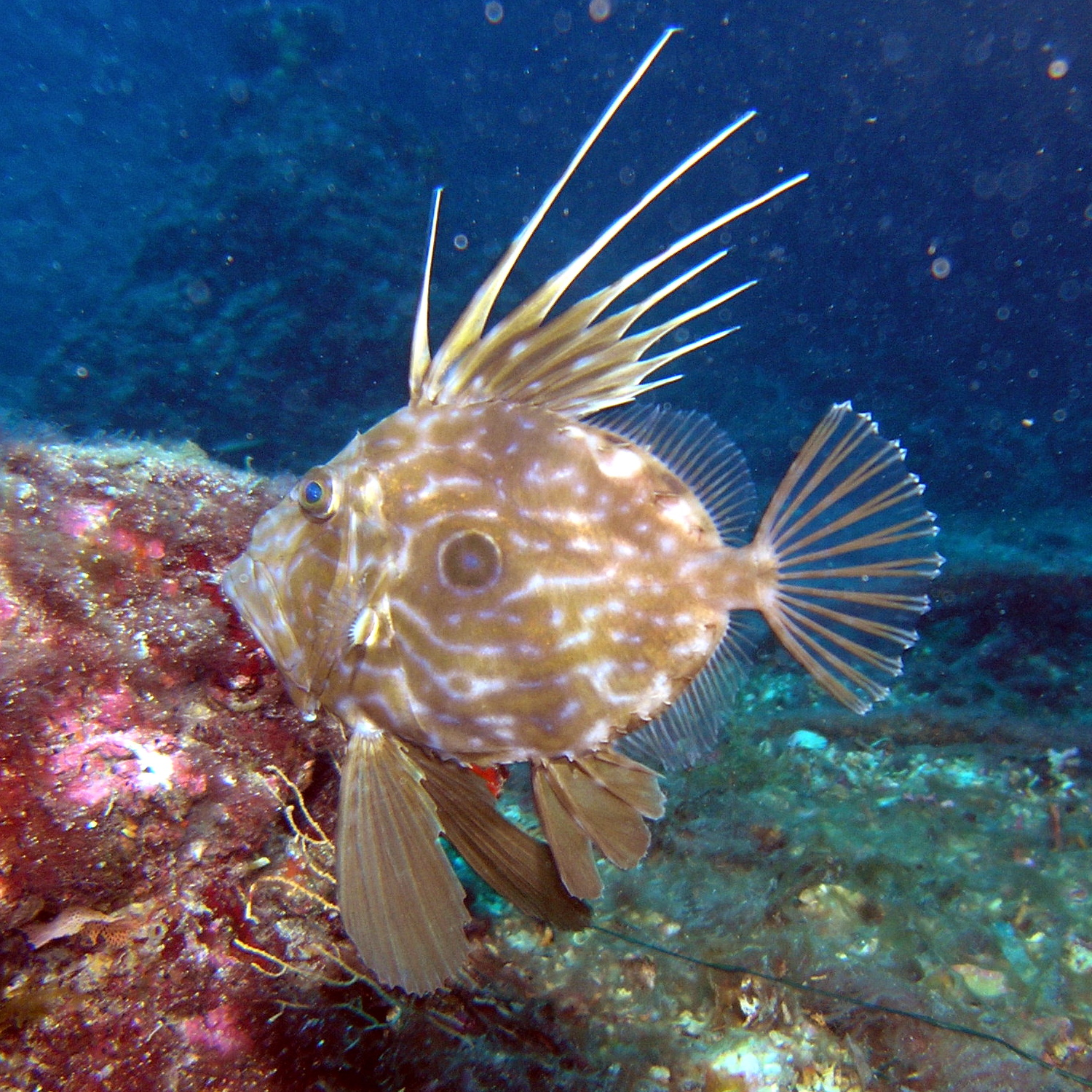

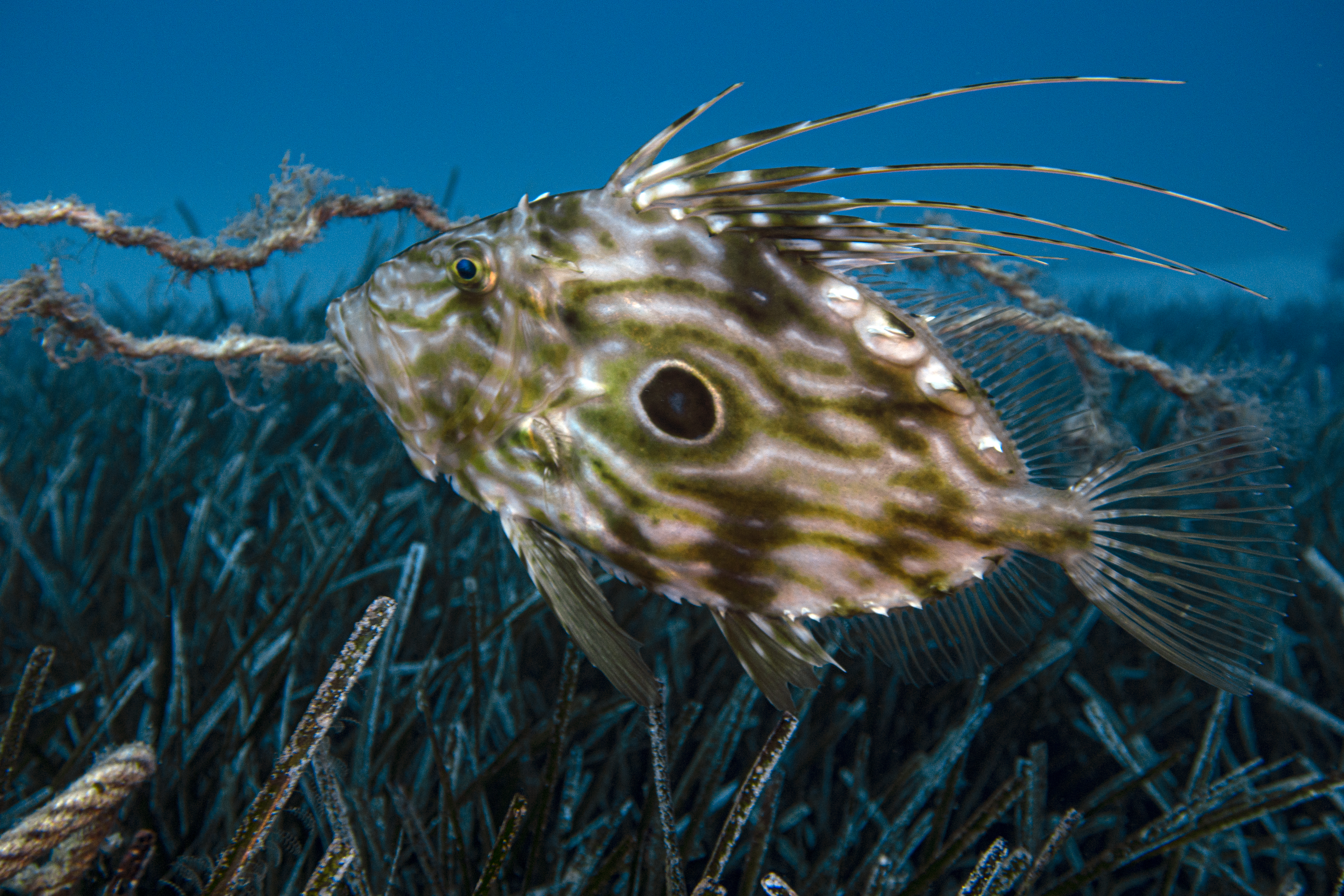

Conservation status
- Data Deficient (IUCN 3.1)

Scientific classification
- Kingdom: Animalia
- Phylum: Chordata
- Class: Actinopterygii
- Division: Teleostei
- Order: Zeiformes
- Family: Zeidae
- Genus: Zeus
- Species: Z. faber

Binomial name
- Zeus faber Linnaeus, 1758

Synonyms
- Zeus australis Richardson, 1845; Zeus faber mauritanicus Desbrosses, 1937; Zeus japonicus Valenciennes, 1835; Zeus pungio Cuvier, 1829

= John Dory =

John Dory Temporal range: Pleistocene to present

Species of fish

John Dory, St Pierre, or Peter's fish are names which refers to fish of the genus Zeus, especially Zeus faber, which is a demersal coastal marine fish. This widespread species has a laterally compressed olive-yellow body which has a large dark spot, and long spines on the dorsal fin. Its large eyes at the front of the head provide it with binocular vision and depth perception, which are important for predators. The John Dory's eye spot on the side of its body also confuses prey, which are scooped up in its large mouth.

== Evolution ==
The John Dory belongs to an ancient lineage of fish known from fossils since the Late Cretaceous, with fossils of its genus Zeus being known as far back as the Oligocene. Formerly, fossils from the Oligocene of Poland and the Late Miocene of Italy and Algeria were attributed to this species, but more recent studies have now consider these to be distinct, being known as Zeus jerzmanskae and Zeus primaevus. The only fossils known of Z. faber itself are from the Pleistocene of Italy.

Analysis of COI genes revealed two distinct clades of Zeus faber; clade A corresponds to the populations inhabiting the Mediterranean and the Northeast Atlantic (along European coastlines), while clade B inhabits all other locales; this group of John Dories corresponds to fish inhabiting the southern coast of Morocco, the Atlantic coastline of Africa including South Africa, the Mid-Atlantic Bight, and eastwards to Asia and Oceania. These two clades, which diverged around 4.8 million years ago and have no overlapping distribution, may be best considered as two evolutionarily significant units (ESUs), and the taxonomy of the genus may need to be revised.

== Morphology ==
The John Dory grows to a maximum size of 90 cm (35 in) and a maximum weight of 8 kg (18 lb), though more typically 65 cm (26 in) for females, and 45 cm (18 in) for males. It has 9 to 11 long spines on its dorsal fin and 4 spines on its anal fin. It has microscopic, sharp scales that run around the body. The fish is yellowish-brown to olive green with a paler greyish belly, and has a dark spot on its side. Its eyes are near the top of its head. It has a flat, round body shape and is a poor swimmer.

== Habitat ==
John Dory are benthopelagic coastal fish, found in the Mediterranean Sea and the northeast Atlantic Ocean off the coasts of northern Africa and southern and western Europe north to Norway, though scarce north of Ireland and southern England. It also occurs in the seas off Southeast Asia, New Zealand, Australia, and the coasts of Japan. They live near the seabed, living in depths from 5 to 360 metres (20 to 1,180 ft). They are normally solitary. John Dory are more commonly found in the waters of the North Island of New Zealand than the colder waters surrounding the South Island.

== Biology ==
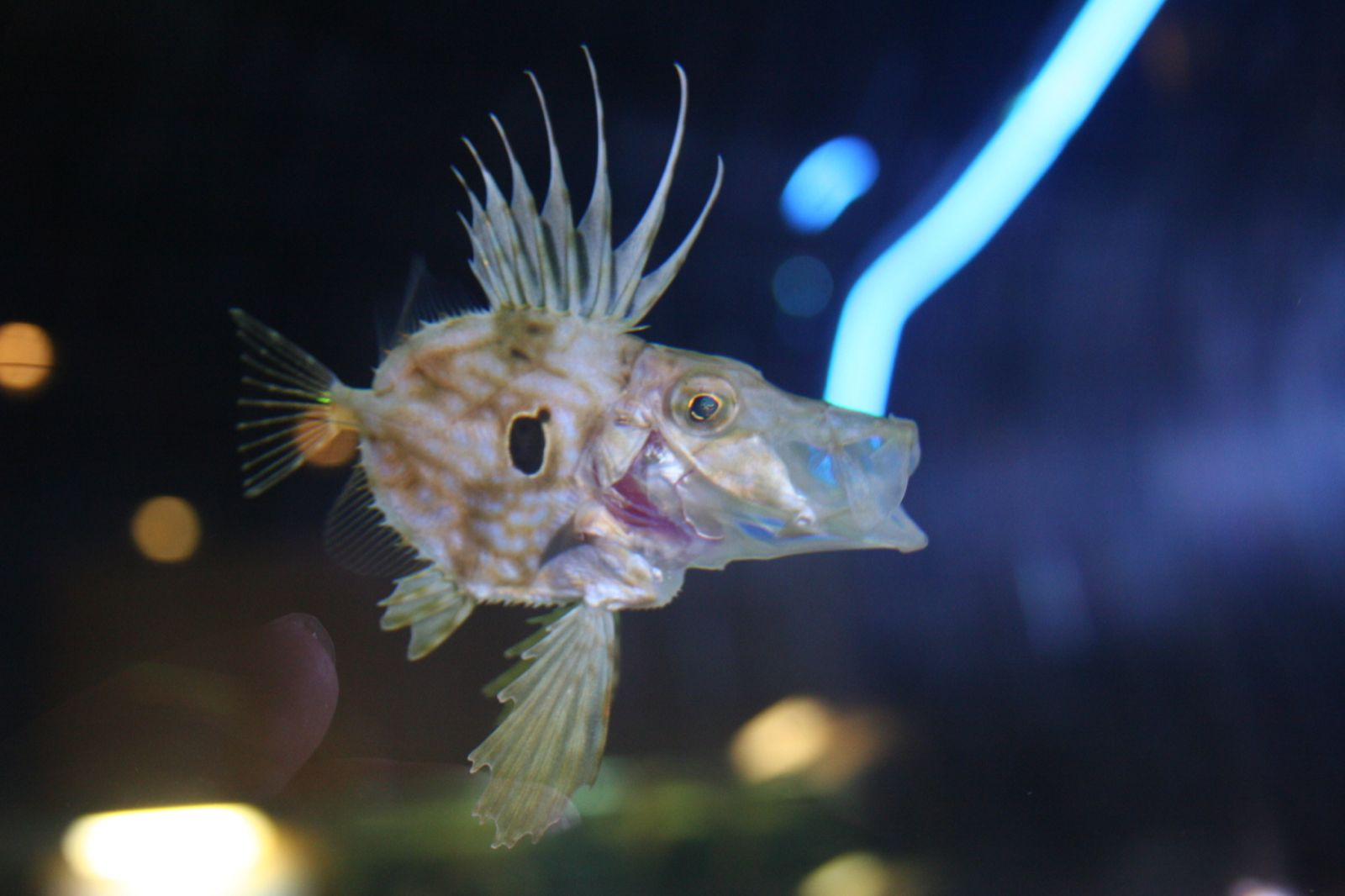
Jaws extended

The John Dory catches prey by stalking it, then extending its jaw forward in a tube-like structure to suck prey items in. The water then flows out through the gills; the premaxillary bone, the only tooth-bearing bone in this fish, is used to grind the food.

The John Dory has a high laterally compressed body – its body is so thin it can hardly be seen from the front. The large eyes at the front of the head provide it with the binocular vision and depth perception it needs to catch prey. The eye spot on the flanks also confuses prey, which can then be sucked into its mouth.

It primarily eats small schooling fish, though may also feed on cephalopods and crustaceans. Its main predators are sharks such as the dusky shark, and large bony fish.

=== Life history ===
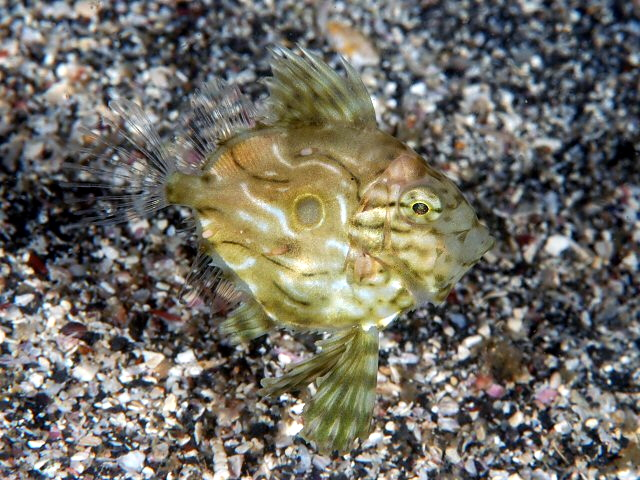
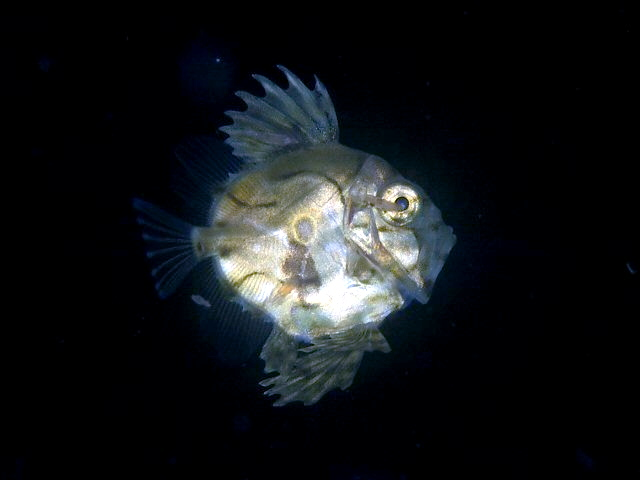
Young John Dories

When John Dories are three or four years of age, they are ready to reproduce. They lay pelagic eggs, which become part of the plankton. Typical lifespan is about 12 years in the wild.

== Relation to humans ==
=== Etymology ===
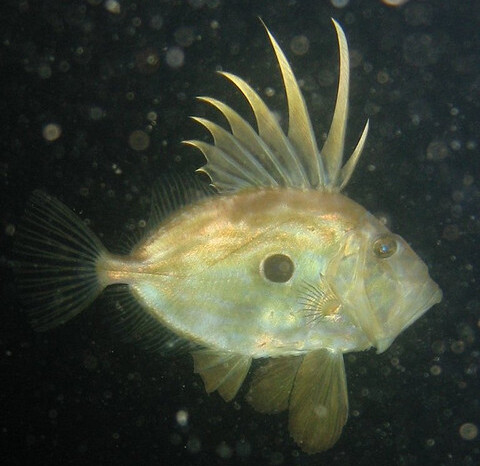
Hondarribia, Spain

The name dory is attested from 1440, derived from the French dorée 'gilded', a French name for the fish. The addition of "John" appears in 1609, and probably comes from a 17th-century song about a sea captain, John Dory. Etymologies claiming it comes from the French jaune dorée (meaning "golden yellow") which sounds like 'John Dory' in English, or the Italian gianitore 'janitor' are now rejected.

The name genus name Zeus comes from the Latin zaeus, from the Greek ζαίος (zaiós) which refers directly to this species. According to Sven O. Kullander zaeus has no relation with the name of the king of gods in Greek mythology. However, other authors dispute this, pointing to the fish's earlier name of Piscis jovii ("fish of Jove"), who was equated with Zeus.

A legend says that the dark spot on the fish's flank is St. Peter's thumbprint. In the north coast of Spain, it is known commonly as San Martiño, or San Martín. The Māori-language name for the fish, kuparu, appears to be unique to New Zealand, as there are no cognates found in other Polynesian languages.

=== As food ===
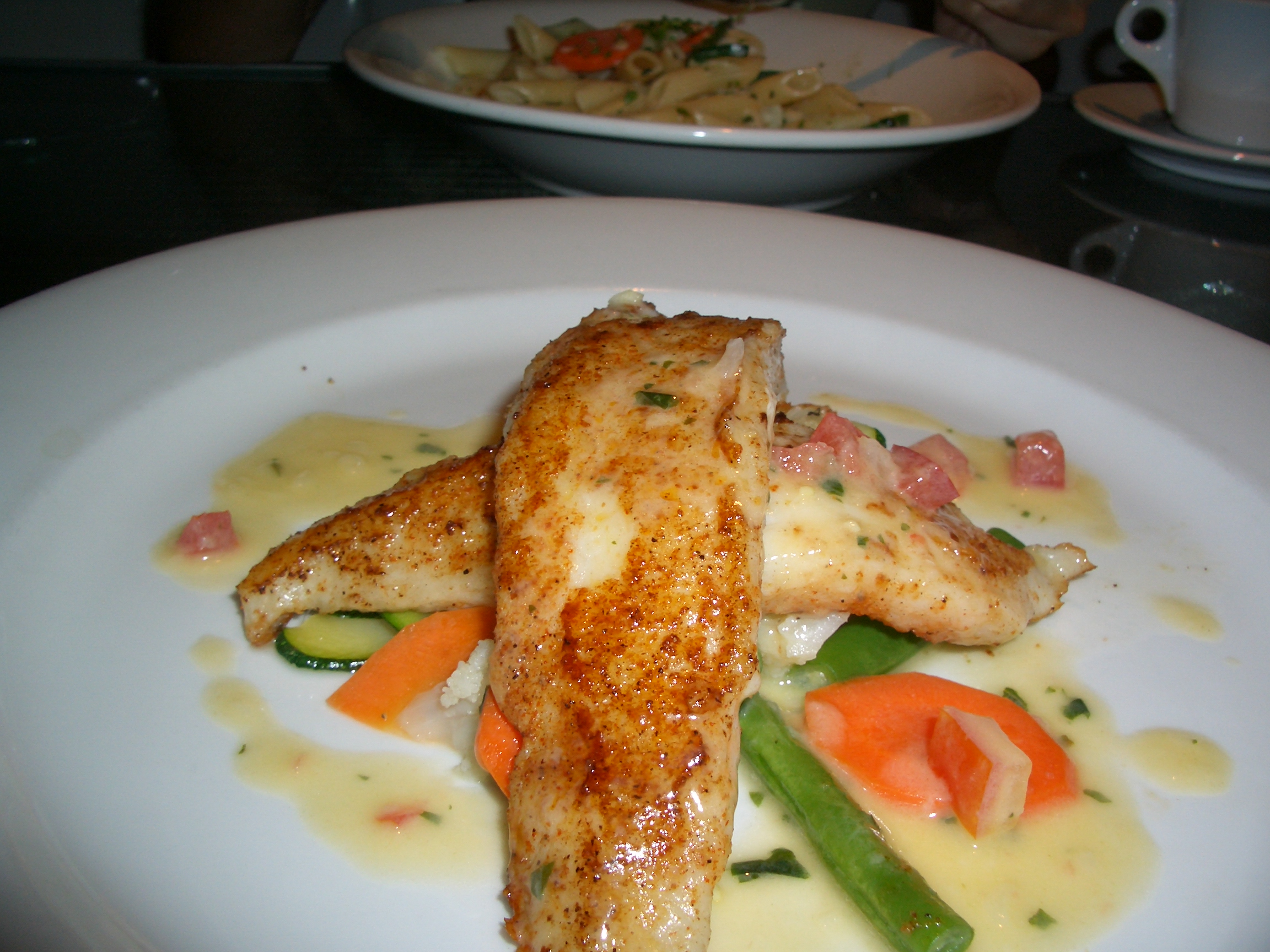
Fillet of John Dory

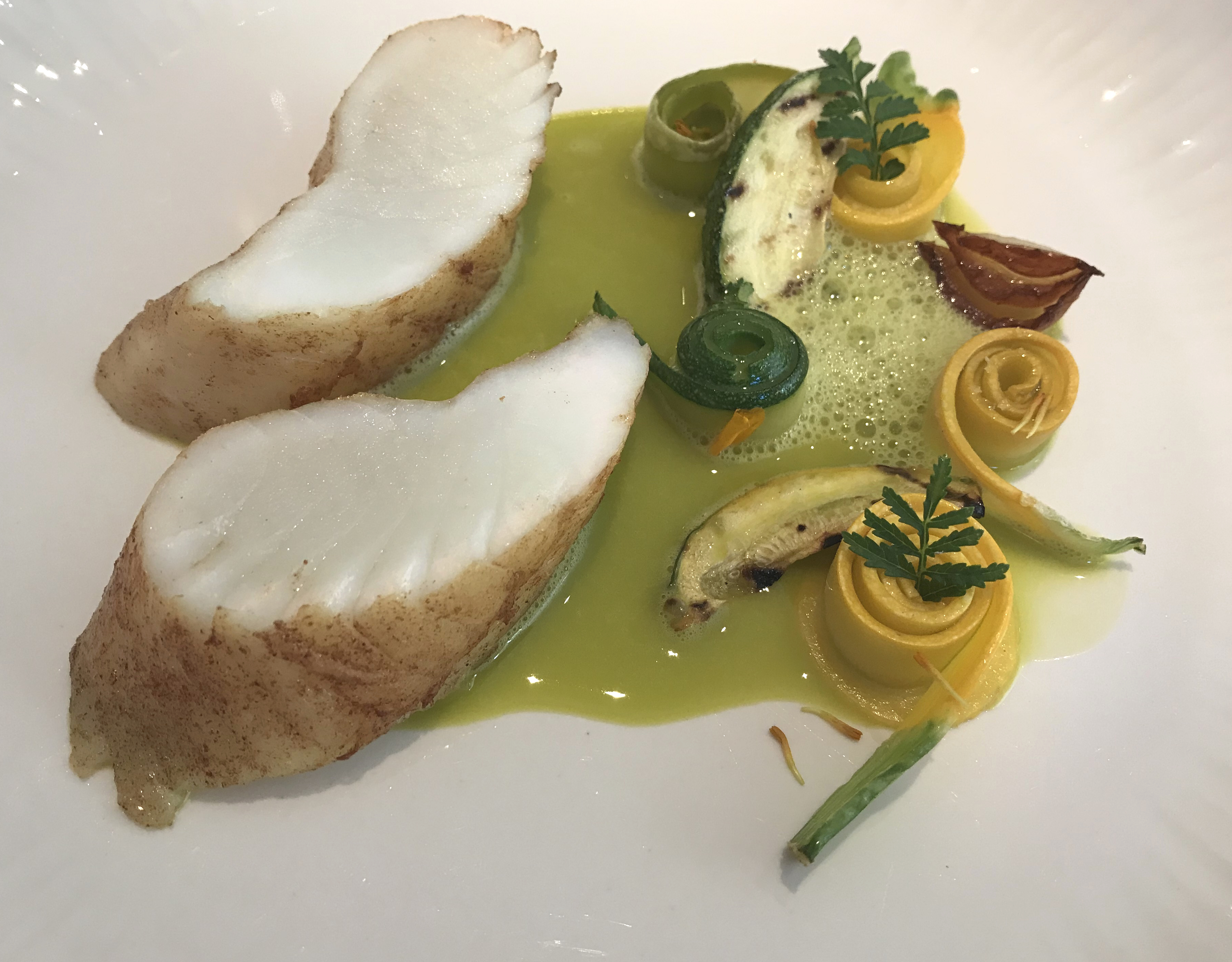
John Dory dish at Maison Pic, Valence, France

In New Zealand, Māori know it as kuparu, and on the East Coast of the North Island, they gave some to Captain James Cook on his first voyage to New Zealand in 1769. Several casks of them were pickled.

Cookery writer Eliza Acton in her 1845 book Modern Cookery for Private Families observed that John Dory "though of uninviting appearance, is considered by some persons as the most delicious fish that appears at table". She recommends simply baking it "very gently", to avoid drying it out in the oven.

John Dory is a popular choice among professional chefs due to the versatility of the fish, though access to home cooks is limited; the bycatch fish is not typically sold at supermarkets.

The "dory" or "dori" sold in certain fish markets, such as those of Indonesia, are more likely to be fillets of various shark catfish species (such as Pangasius) and not of the John Dory.
