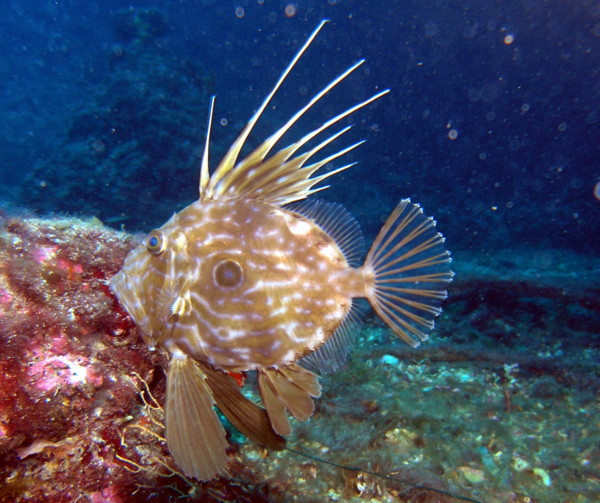
- Zeus faber

Scientific classification
- Kingdom: Animalia
- Phylum: Chordata
- Class: Actinopterygii
- Division: Teleostei
- Superorder: Paracanthopterygii
- Order: Zeiformes; Regan, 1909

Type species
- Zeus faber Linnaeus, 1758

Families
- See text

= Zeiformes =

Zeiformes Temporal range: Santonian to recent

Order of ray-finned fishes

The Zeiformes /ˈziːɪfɔːrmiːz/ are a small order of exclusively marine ray-finned fishes most notable for the dories, a group of common food fish. The order consists of about 33 species in six extant families, mostly deep-sea types. The boarfishes (Caproidae) have been previously included in this order though they are currently included in Acanthuriformes.

Zeiform bodies are usually thin and deep. Mouths are large, with distensible jaws, and there is no orbitosphenoid. Pelvic fins have 5–10 soft rays and possibly a spine, 5–10 dorsal fin spines and up to 4 anal fin spines. They range in size from the dwarf dory (Macrurocyttus acanthopodus), at 43 millimetres (1.7 in) in length, to the Cape dory (Zeus capensis), which measures up to 90 centimetres (35 in).

The earliest known member of the order is Cretazeus from the Late Cretaceous (late Campanian or early Maastrichtian) of Nardò, Italy. Uniquely, despite its age, Cretazeus is thought to be a derived crown-group zeiform closely related to the Parazenidae (in contrast, the two most basal zeiform families are known from later, during the early Paleogene). This suggests that at least six lineages of zeiforms were present during the Late Cretaceous and survived the Cretaceous-Paleogene extinction, despite this not being preserved in the fossil record. Aside from Cretazeus, an earlier record of the zeiforms is an indeterminate fossil otolith ("genus Zeiformomum" tyleri) from the Santonian of Spain, but its specific affinities remain uncertain. A potentially older genus, Palaeocyttus of Portugal, is known only from a poorly-preserved specimen and may not be a zeiform.

== Families ==
- Family Cyttidae (lookdown dories)
- Family Grammicolepididae (tinselfishes)
- Family Oreosomatidae (oreos)
- Family Parazenidae (parazens)
- Family Zeidae (dories)
- Family Zenionidae (zeniontids) (formerly known as Macrurocyttidae)
- Family †Archaeozeidae (extinct, Archaeozeus skamolensis)
- Family †Bajaichthyidae (extinct, Bajaichthys elegans)
- Family †Cretazeidae (extinct, Cretazeus rinaldii; alternatively a member of Parazenidae)
- Family †Protozeidae (extinct, Protozeus kuehnei)
