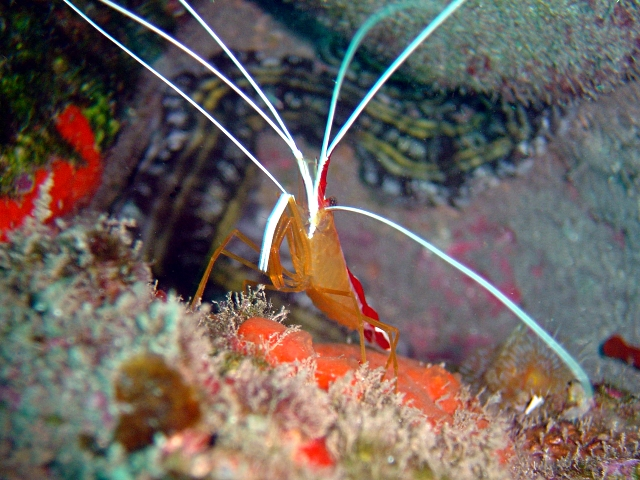

Scientific classification
- Kingdom: Animalia
- Phylum: Arthropoda
- Clade: Pancrustacea
- Class: Malacostraca
- Order: Decapoda
- Suborder: Pleocyemata
- Infraorder: Caridea
- Family: Lysmatidae
- Genus: Lysmata
- Species: L. grabhami

Binomial name
- Lysmata grabhami (Gordon, 1935)

Synonyms
- Hippolysmata grabhami Gordon, 1935

= Lysmata grabhami =

Species of crustacean

Lysmata grabhami is a species of saltwater shrimp in the family Hippolytidae. It was first described by Gordon in 1935. It occurs in the tropical and subtropical Atlantic Ocean and is a cleaner shrimp, operating a cleaning station to which fish come to have parasites removed.

== Description ==
Lysmata grabhami can grow to a length of 6 cm (2.4 in). Its appearance is distinctive; the antennae are white as are the third pair of maxillipeds; the body is yellow, with a continuous white dorsal stripe running from head to telson, bordered with a longitudinal red stripe on either side; the legs are yellow, and the external branches of the uropods have a white stripe on the outer edge.

== Distribution ==
Lysmata grabhami occurs in shallow water on either side of the tropical and sub-tropical Atlantic Ocean. It is typically found in reef environments. In the West Atlantic it is found on the coast of North America, the Caribbean Sea and Gulf of Mexico and around Bermuda. In the East Atlantic it occurs in the Canary Islands, Madeira and Cape Verde.

== Ecology ==
Lysmata grabhami is a cleaner shrimp; in common with certain other shrimps and certain small fish, it has established behaviours involving cleaning stations to which larger fish come to have their external parasites removed. The shrimp waves its long white antennae to attract a fish, the fish poses, extending a fin or opening its mouth, the shrimp hops onto the fish and picks at the parasites until the fish disengages. The shrimp may occupy a single cleaning station for extended periods. Client fish include groupers, parrotfishes and tangs.

This is a symbiotic arrangement, the client fish benefits from having its parasites removed and the shrimp benefits from the extra nutrition it receives. Six species of shrimp from three different families have developed this practice, a case of convergent evolution.

== In aquaria ==
Lysmata grabhami is sometimes kept in a reef aquarium, but its sister species from the Pacific, Lysmata amboinensis, is seen much more often in the trade. Both species will clean other fish in the aquarium.
