= Scarlet cleaner shrimp =

Scarlet cleaner shrimp may refer to:

- Lysmata amboinensis, also known as the skunk cleaner shrimp
- Lysmata debelius, also known as the blood shrimp
