= Urocaridella cyrtorhyncha =

Scientific classification
- Domain: Eukaryota
- Kingdom: Animalia
- Phylum: Arthropoda
- Class: Malacostraca
- Order: Decapoda
- Suborder: Pleocyemata
- Infraorder: Caridea
- Family: Palaemonidae
- Genus: Urocaridella
- Species: U. cyrtorhyncha

Binomial name
- Urocaridella cyrtorhyncha (Fujino & Miyake, 1969)

Synonyms
- Leandrites cyrtorhynchus Fujino & Miyake, 1969; Urocaridella renatekhalafae Khalaf in Khalaf & Khalaf, 2018

Species of shrimp

Urocaridella cyrtorhyncha is a species of shrimp in the family Palaemonidae. The species is similar to U. urocaridella, U. antonbruunii, and U. pulchella. The species is found in the Indian and Pacific Oceans, including the Red Sea.
