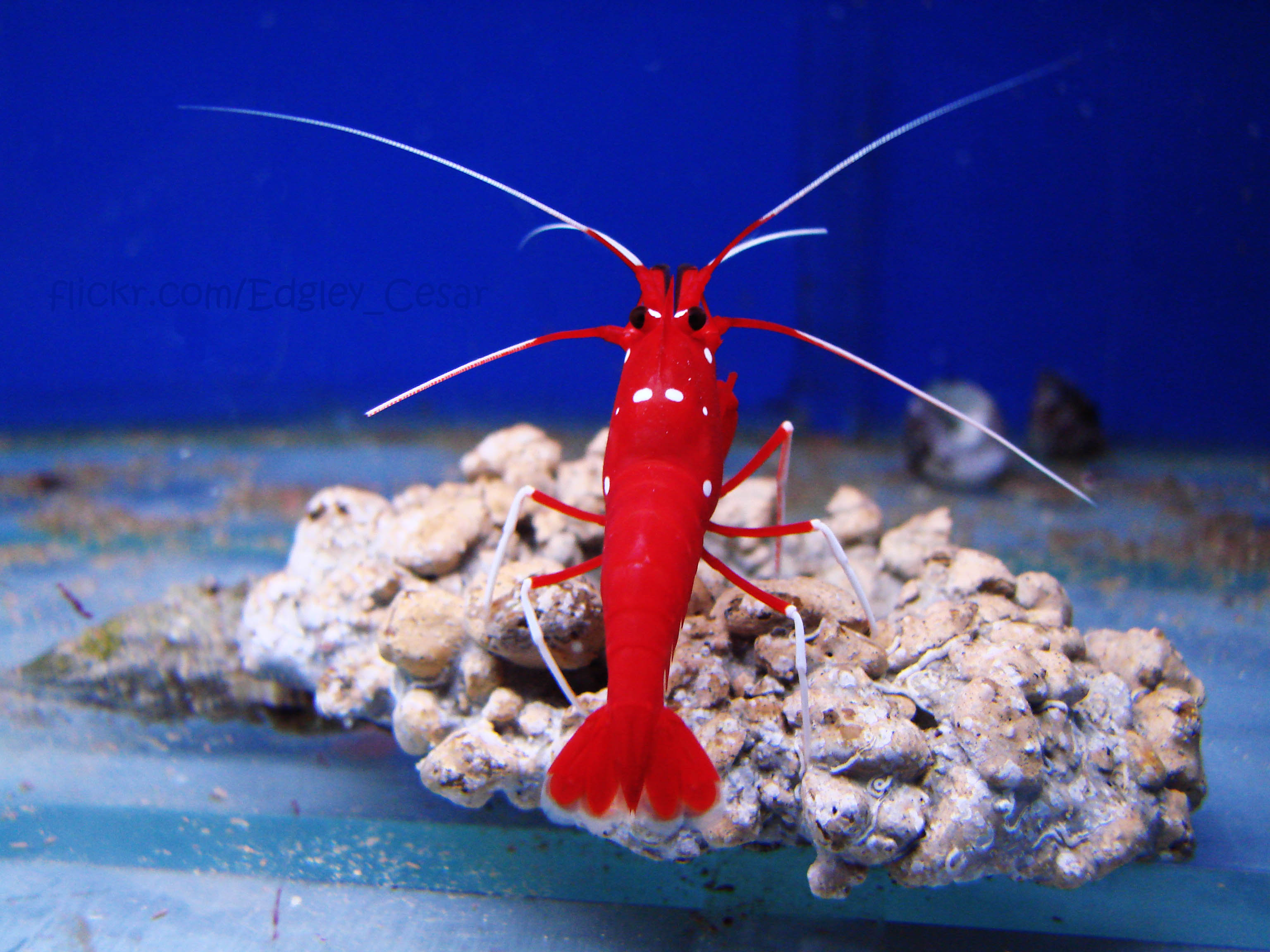

Scientific classification
- Kingdom: Animalia
- Phylum: Arthropoda
- Clade: Pancrustacea
- Class: Malacostraca
- Order: Decapoda
- Suborder: Pleocyemata
- Infraorder: Caridea
- Family: Lysmatidae
- Genus: Lysmata
- Species: L. debelius

Binomial name
- Lysmata debelius Bruce, 1983

= Lysmata debelius =

Species of crustacean

Lysmata debelius is a species of cleaner shrimp indigenous to the Indo-Pacific. It is popular in the aquarium trade, where it is known as the fire shrimp, blood shrimp or scarlet cleaner shrimp.

== Taxonomy ==
Lysmata debelius was first described by A. J. Bruce in 1983, based on type material from Polillo Island in the Philippines. The specific epithet commemorates Helmut Debelius, who had collected the specimens and sent them to a zoologist for identification. A divergent population from Ari Atoll in the Maldives was later described as a separate species, L. splendida, by Rudolf Burukovsky.

== Description ==
Lysmata debelius grows up to 3 centimetres (1.2 in) long, with males and functional hermaphrodites appearing similar. It has a red body, with conspicuous white antennae and white tips to the third to fifth pereiopods. There are white dots on the cephalothorax and legs; white dots on the abdomen distinguish L. splendida from L. debelius.

== Ecology ==
Lysmata debelius is one of a group of species in the genus Lysmata that has the role of a cleaner shrimp in reef ecosystems, alongside L. amboinensis, L. grabhami and L. splendida. It is a popular aquarium pet.

Lysmata debelius is a hermaphrodite and therefore any two individuals may mate. The hatching of eggs, moulting, and copulation cycle is identical to that of L. wurdemanni, yielding weekly batches of zoeae from each pair.
