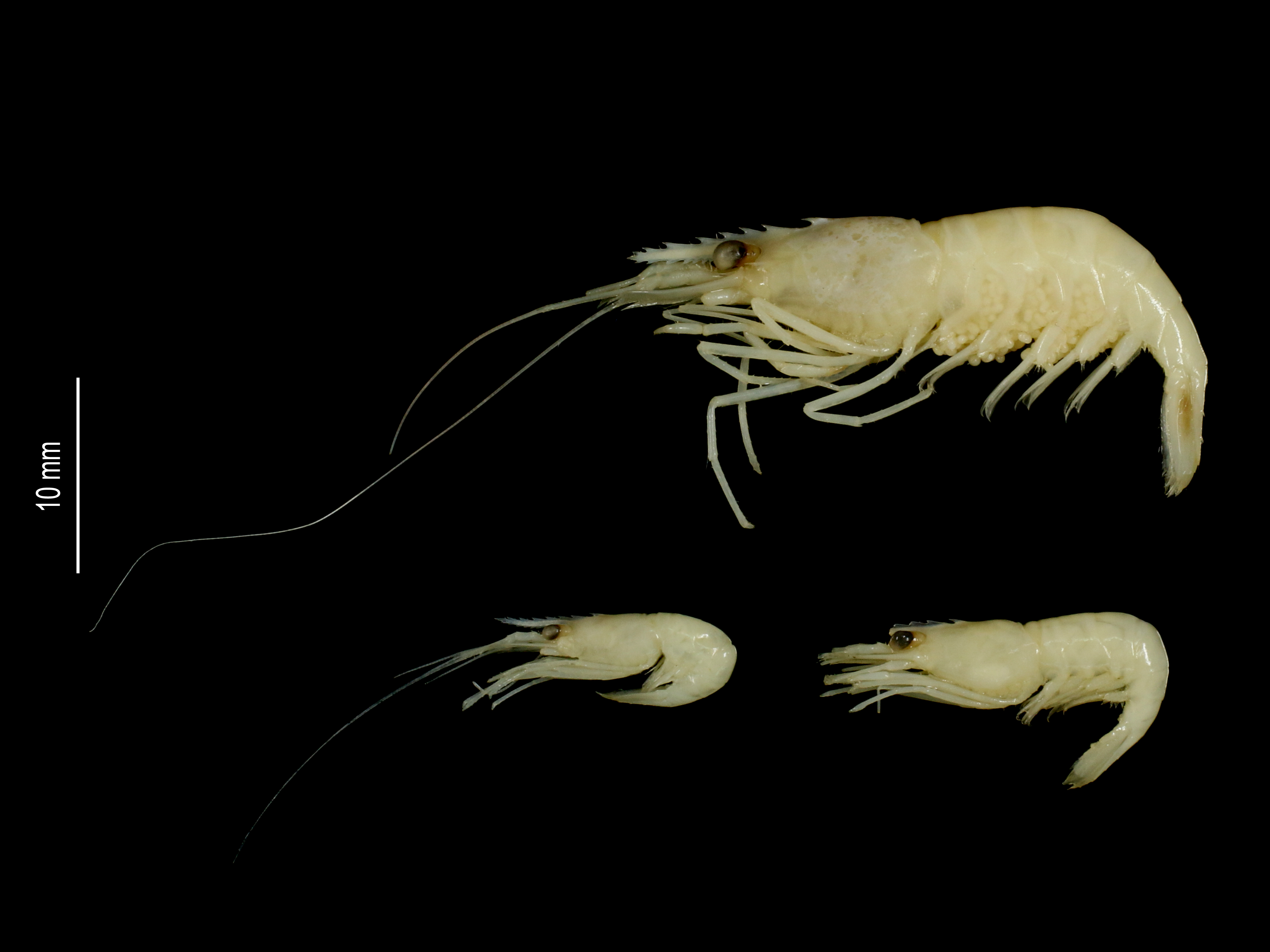

Scientific classification
- Domain: Eukaryota
- Kingdom: Animalia
- Phylum: Arthropoda
- Class: Malacostraca
- Order: Decapoda
- Suborder: Pleocyemata
- Infraorder: Caridea
- Family: Lysmatidae
- Genus: Lysmata
- Species: L. pederseni

Binomial name
- Lysmata pederseni Rhyne & Lin, 2006

= Lysmata pederseni =

Species of crustacean

Lysmata pederseni is a species of saltwater shrimp first classified as Lysmata wurdemanni. It is found in shallow waters of the Atlantic Ocean, and can be distinguished by its coloration pattern and its association with tube sponges.
