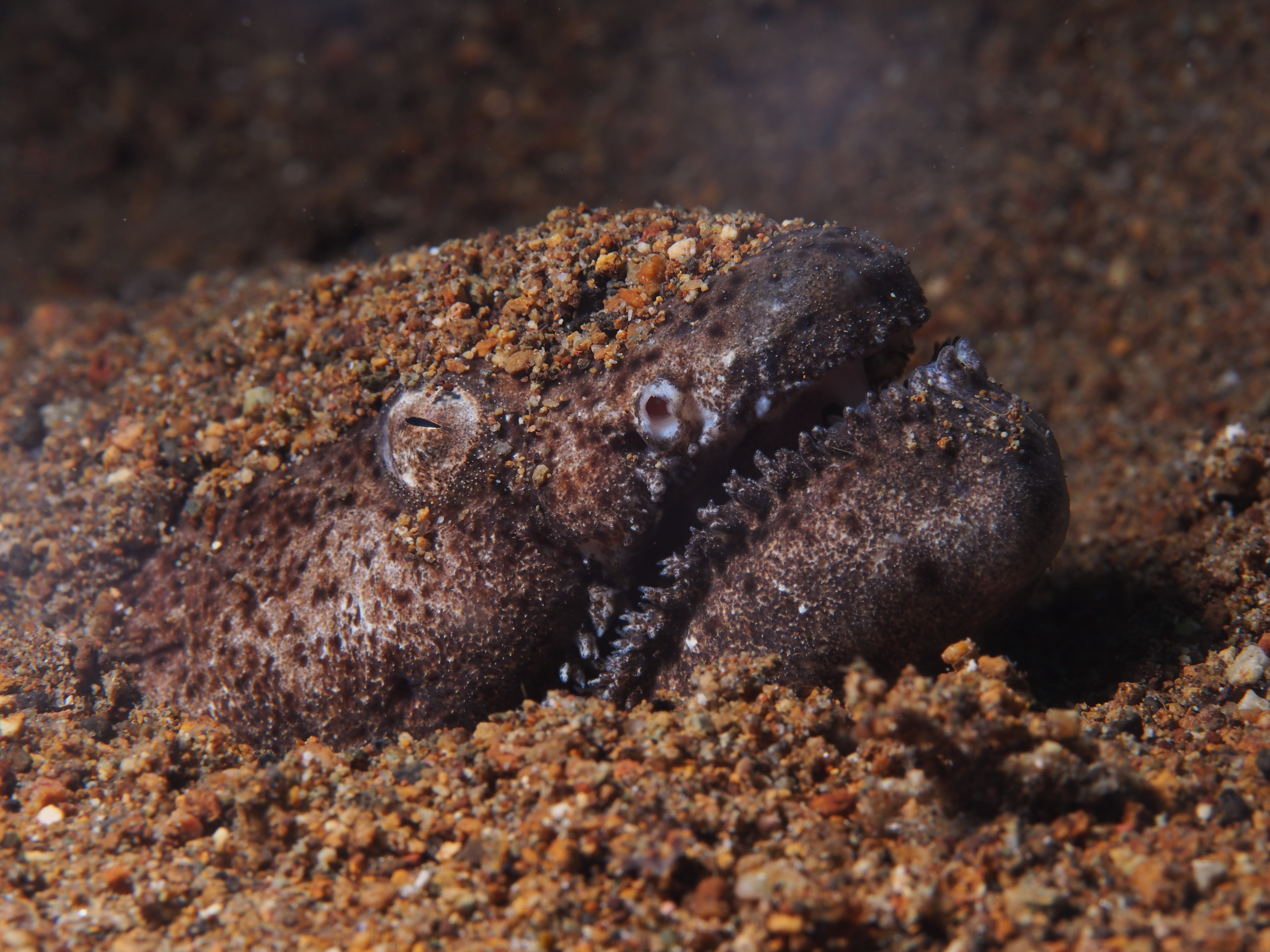
- B. cirrocheilos in Batangas Bay, Philippines

Scientific classification
- Kingdom: Animalia
- Phylum: Chordata
- Class: Actinopterygii
- Order: Anguilliformes
- Family: Ophichthidae
- Genus: Brachysomophis
- Species: B. cirrocheilos

Binomial name
- Brachysomophis cirrocheilos (Bleeker, 1857)

Synonyms
- Ophichthys cirrochilus Günther, 1870; Ophisurus cirrocheilos Bleeker, 1857

= Brachysomophis cirrocheilos =

Species of fish (stargazer snake eel)

Brachysomophis cirrocheilos, also known as the stargazer snake eel, is a benthic marine fish belonging to the family Ophichthidae. The stargazer snake eel is a large fish which grows up to 159 cm (63 in) long.

It is widely distributed throughout the tropical waters of the Indian Ocean, the Red Sea, and the western Pacific Ocean. It inhabits the sandy and muddy bottoms close to coastal reef at depths between about 1 and 10 m (3 and 33 ft). The stargazer snake eel is active at night, remaining immersed in the sediment by day, with just its head protruding.

== Description ==
Brachysomophis cirrocheilos is a moderately elongated snake eel, growing to a maximum length of 159 cm (63 in); the head occupies about 12% of the total length and the tail about 55%. The body is triangular in cross-section, becoming cylindrical behind the vent and ending with a hard, pointed tip. The snout is moderately long and the lower jaw extends beyond the upper jaw. The two pairs of nostrils are very close together and have short tubes. The eyes are rather small and are on the flat, dorsal part of the head rather than on the sides. The mouth has a long cleft and the conical teeth are not visible when the mouth is closed; there are two rows of teeth in the upper jaw and one row on the lower jaw, as well as some canine-like teeth on the roof of the mouth. There are numerous barbels on both upper and lower lips. The pectoral fins are fairly short, and the origin of the dorsal fin lies behind the gill openings and the tips of the pectoral fins. There are neither pelvic fins nor caudal fin. There are between 135 and 140 vertebrae. The colour of the dorsal surface is pale brown, with darker smudges and speckles; the underside is creamy-white and the fins are dusky brown.

== Distribution and habitat ==
Brachysomophis cirrocheilos is native to shallow tropical and subtropical waters in the western Indo-Pacific region, in both marine and brackish habitats. Its range extends from 39°N to 20°S, and from 35°E to 148°E; that is from East Africa and the Red Sea to Japan, Taiwan, and southward to northern Australia. It lives on soft sediment, usually near coastal reefs, burrowing into the sand or mud. It has a depth range of about 1 to 38 m (3 to 125 ft).

== Ecology ==
Brachysomophis cirrocheilos is a nocturnal species. It submerges into the sediment tail first and remains there all day, with just its eyes and the top of its head or its snout projecting; its cryptic colouration makes it difficult to observe. At night it leaves its burrow to forage for crustaceans and small fish. It has sometimes been observed in association with a cleaning shrimp, Ancylomenes magnificus, which rests on its head. The shrimp periodically swims away from the fish, returning later to perch on the fish's head once more. Brachysomophis cirrocheilos is not targeted by commercial fisheries and is not known to be edible.
