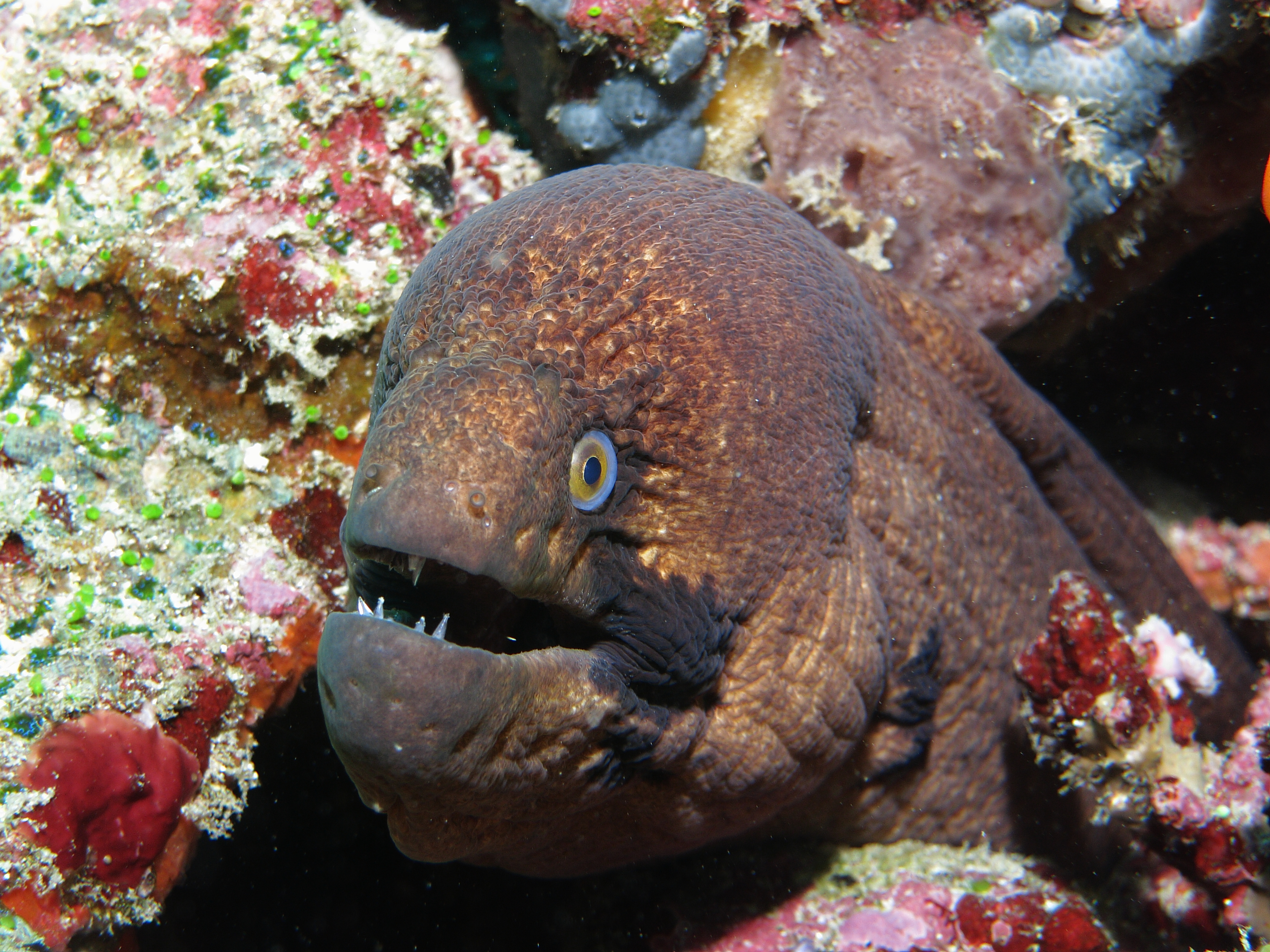
- Blackcheek moray

Conservation status
- Least Concern (IUCN 3.1)

Scientific classification
- Kingdom: Animalia
- Phylum: Chordata
- Class: Actinopterygii
- Order: Anguilliformes
- Family: Muraenidae
- Genus: Gymnothorax
- Species: G. breedeni

Binomial name
- Gymnothorax breedeni McCosker & J. E. Randall, 1977

= Blackcheek moray eel =

Species of fish

The blackcheek moray eel or masked moray (Gymnothorax breedeni) is a species of marine fish in the family Muraenidae.

== Distribution ==
The blackcheek moray eel is widespread throughout the tropical waters of the Indo-Pacific area from eastern coast of Africa until oceanic islands from the Pacific Ocean like Polynesia but not Hawaii. It is a very common moray on the Maldives reefs.

== Habitat ==
This moray eel occurs in clear seaward reefs of oceanic islands, especially in porous coral rock and in reef walls and steep slopes with holes. It likes reefs composed of rubble and debris of dead coral in which it finds its shelter, often on the outer slopes between 4 and 40 meters deep.

== Description ==
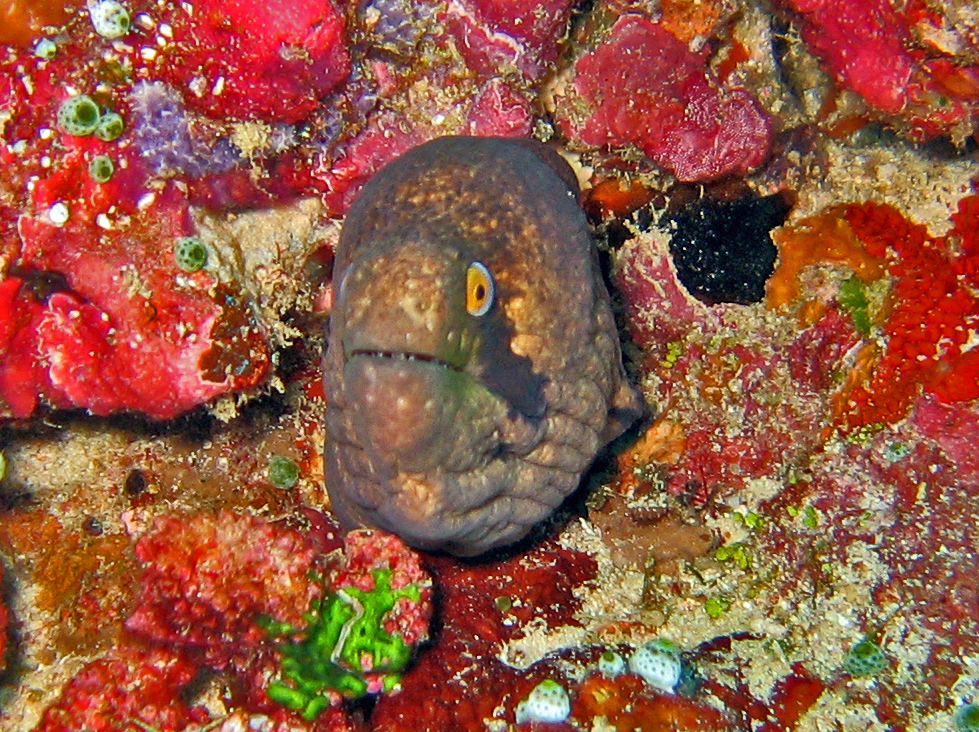
Gymnothorax breedeni from Maldives

The blackcheek moray eel is a medium-sized fish that can reach a maximum length of 100 cm, but usually morays observed are often smaller. The background body color is brown speckled in a relatively high density with darker spots. This moray is easily identifiable by the large irregular black patch mark (hence the common name of blackcheek moray eel) starting from the eye and finishing in the corner of the mouth. Otherwise, its anal orifice and its gills aperture are black.

== Biology ==
The blackcheek moray is rather solitary and very territorial, it is likely to bite any foreign body entering its vigilance area.

It also lives in association with cleaner shrimps and the Anthias. It feeds on fish and octopuses at night, when it comes out of its lair.

== Bibliography ==
- Anderson, M.E. y V.V. Fedorov, 2004. Family Zoarcidae (Swainson, 1839. Eelpouts. Calif. Acad. Sci. Annotated Checklists of Fishes (34):58.
- Castle, P.H.J. and J.E. McCosker (1986) Muraenidae., p. 165-176. In M.M. Smith and P.C. Heemstra (eds.) Smiths' sea fishes. Springer-Verlag, Berlin.
- Eschmeyer, William N., ed. 1998. Catalog of Fishes. Special Publication of the Center for Biodiversity Research and Information, núm. 1, vol. 1-3. California Academy of Sciences. San Francisco, California, USA. ISBN 0-940228-47-5.
- Eschmeyer, William N.: Genera of Recent Fishes. California Academy of Sciences. San Francisco, California, USA. iii + 697. ISBN 0-940228-23-8. 1990.
- Helfman, G., B. Collette y D. Facey: The diversity of fishes. Blackwell Science, Malden, Massachusetts, USA, 1997.
- Moyle, P. y J. Cech.: Fishes: An Introduction to Ichthyology, 4a. edición, Upper Saddle River, New Jersey, USA Unidos: Prentice-Hall. 2000.
- Nelson, J.S. 2006: Fishes of the world. 4º edición. John Wiley & Sons, Inc. Hoboken, New Jersey, USA. 601 p.
- Wheeler, A.: The World Encyclopedia of Fishes, 2nd. Ed. London: Macdonald. 1985.
