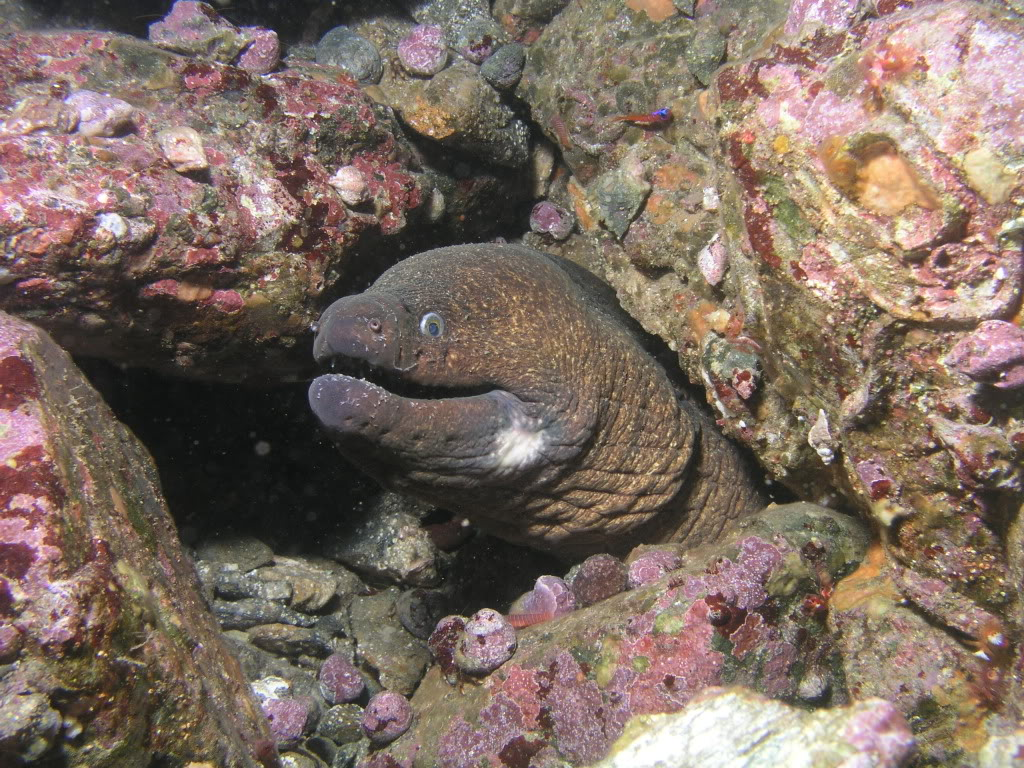

Conservation status
- Least Concern (IUCN 3.1)

Scientific classification
- Kingdom: Animalia
- Phylum: Chordata
- Class: Actinopterygii
- Division: Teleostei
- Order: Anguilliformes
- Family: Muraenidae
- Genus: Gymnothorax
- Species: G. mordax

Binomial name
- Gymnothorax mordax (Ayres, 1859)

= California moray =

Species of fish

The California moray (Gymnothorax mordax) is a moray eel of the family Muraenidae, found in the eastern Pacific from just north of Santa Barbara to Santa Maria Bay in Baja California. They are the only species of moray eel found off California, and one of the few examples of a subtropical moray. They typically occupy boulder or cobble habitats up to 40 m (130 ft) in depth. They can attain lengths of about 5 ft (1.52 m) and are believed to live for upwards of 22–26 years. Like other morays, they have no pelvic or pectoral fins or gill covers.

== Habitat and distribution ==
California morays are a common sight on rocky reefs surrounding islands in southern California (notably, Catalina Island in the California Channel Islands) and other islands in the Pacific. Their geographic distribution extends from Point Conception, California to Magdalena Bay, Baja California.

California moray juveniles can live in tide pools while adults live in deeper waters. Adult California morays have high site fidelity, remaining in the same general location throughout their adult lives.

== Ecology ==
=== Symbiotic relationship ===
The California moray has a distinct mutualistic symbiotic relationship with red rock shrimp where the cleaner shrimp clean the moray. The red rock shrimp aggregate in large populations on the moray. In addition to cleaning, the cleaner shrimp help kills parasites within the mouth cavity and have been found to reach the stomach to feed on parasites.

=== Diet ===
The California moray is thought to be primarily piscivorous, and appears to specialize in the kelp bass, Paralabrax clathratus. However, they are opportunistic predators whose diet also consists of invertebrate prey such as octopuses, lobsters, other California morays, and red rock shrimp.

=== Feeding behavior ===
The California moray is the apex predator in the reef, its natural habitat, as they have few natural predators and face no intense competition for prey. They are thought to be nocturnal hunters due to their elusiveness in the daytime.

Although many fishes have highly expandable skulls and can use suction feeding to capture prey, the fused skulls of morays prevents this. Instead, California morays (like other moray eels) have a special set of pharyngeal jaws that allows prey to be transported from their mouths into their throats. These pharyngeal jaws look like miniature versions of the oral jaws and are more mobile than pharyngeal jaws in the other fishes. As an additional aid to prey transport, they have a set of depressible teeth in the roof of their mouths that fold upward as prey is swallowed. Despite the bite force of the California moray varying from 32 N and 467 N, morays do not exhibit a preference for certain food types based on their relative bite force.

The California moray's prey manipulation behaviors, including consumption and transportation, also do not vary depending on prey type. However, the time spent on prey manipulation behaviors increases as prey size increases. The California moray spends more time feeding as the size of the fish and cephalopods increases. However, when consuming a cephalopod, the California moray spends a greater proportion of time on transportation than feeding. Moreover, prey size increases with the size of the individual California moray. When it comes time for the moray to feed on a cephalopod, like an octopus, the cephalopod will resist by latching on the head of the moray with its tentacles. To counter the cephalopod, the moray will twist and rotate its body so the tentacles can unhinge off the body so the moray can eat the cephalopod. As a California moray grows, its prey becomes larger and it stops consuming smaller organisms.

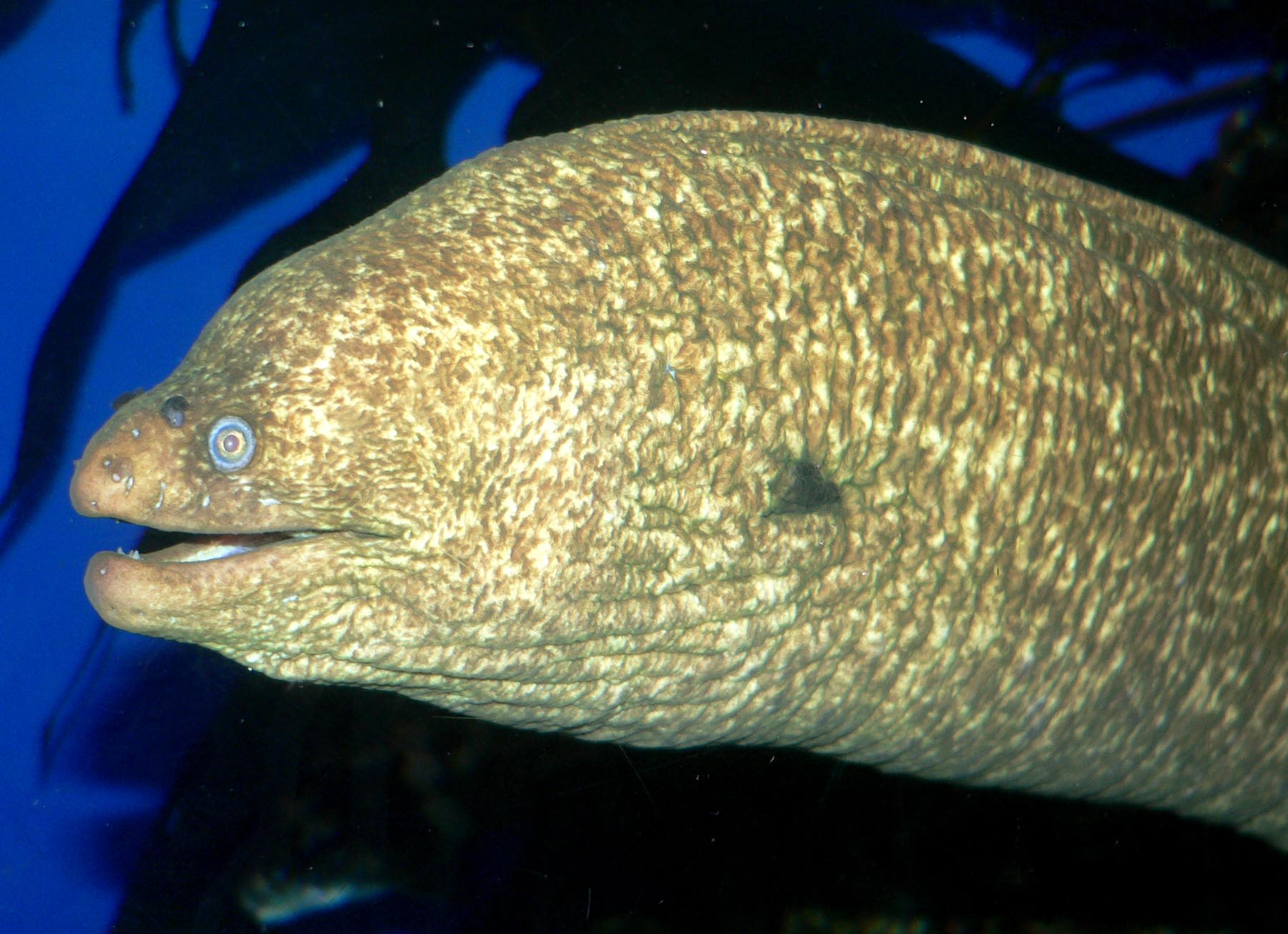
California moray

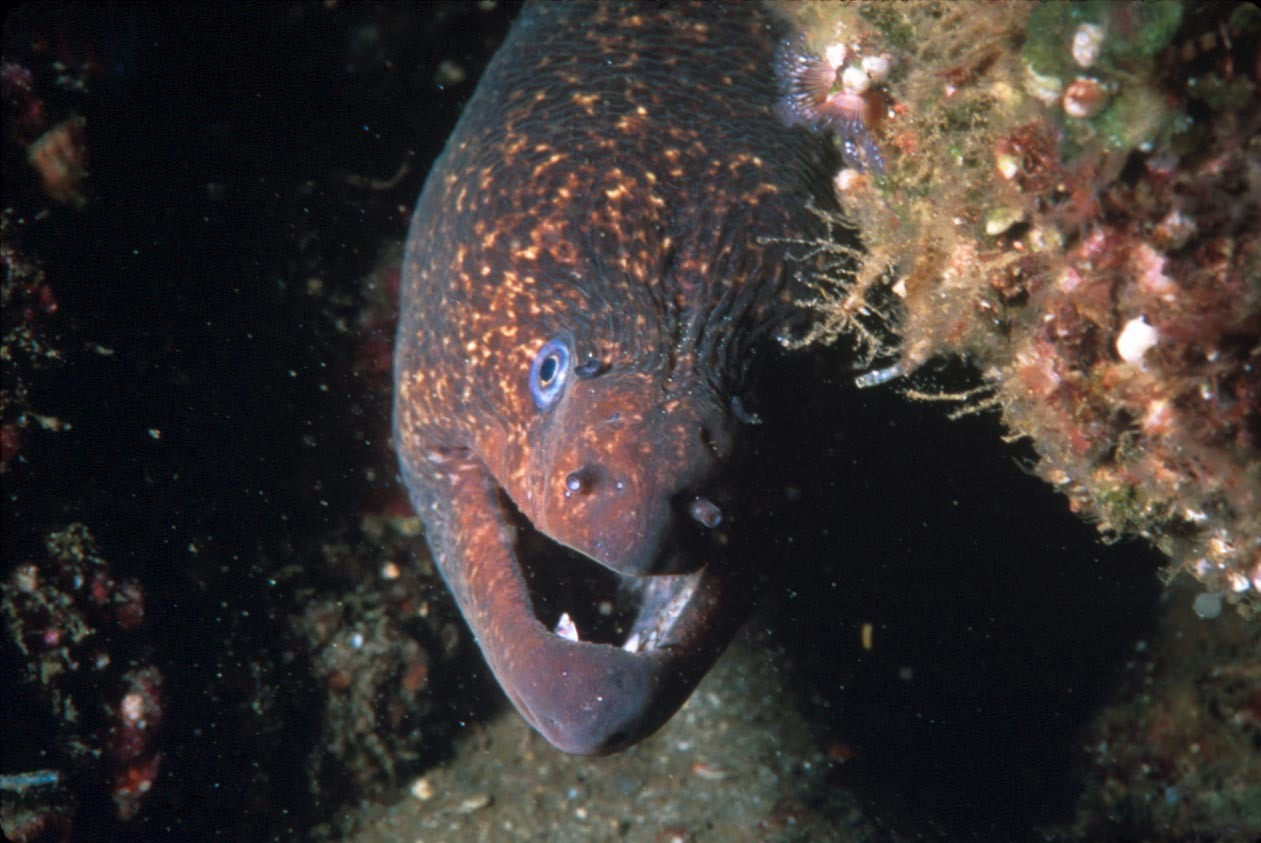
California moray

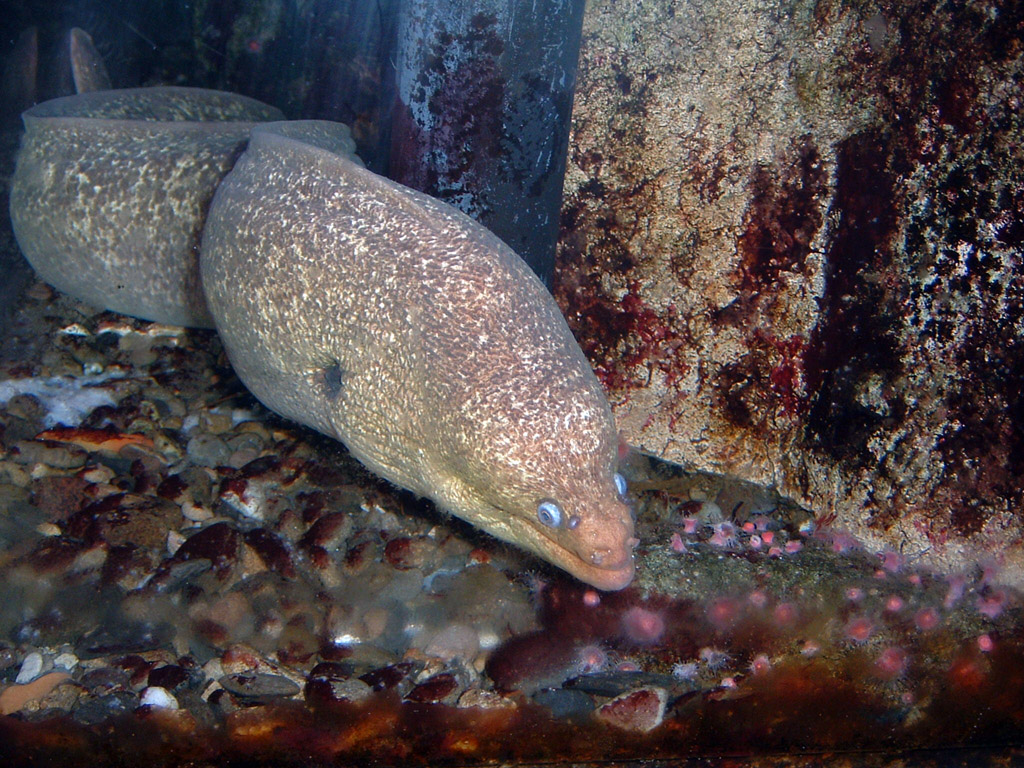
California moray

== Behavior ==
=== Reproduction ===
The California moray is believed to mate and spawn in the warm waters off the coast of Baja Mexico, with larvae being transported northward to California during winter or El Niño Southern Oscillation events. At least one study has proposed that this species is non-reproductive in the most northern parts of its range due to the water temperature being too cold for gonadal development. A study used otoliths (ear bones) of California morays from Catalina Island to estimate individuals' ages, which cross-referenced with data from the Oceanic Niño Index (ONI) and revealed that the majority of individuals examined likely only arrived on Catalina Island due to an El Niño Southern Oscillation event. During an ENSO event, larvae drifted north due to the northward-flowing Davidson Current. The fertilization of eggs occurs in the water, and although the pelagic larval duration (PLD) of larval G. mordax is unknown, studies on related species suggest that the larval state persists in the open ocean for several months before settling to reefs.

=== Threats to humans ===
Human attacks due to the California moray are very rare but possible when venturing near them. California morays are not venomous, but they have the capability of causing deep puncture wounds with their bite. Injuries can become infected

== Conservation ==
The California moray is classified by the IUCN Red List as a species of least concern. The California moray is not commercially fished, but the species does face threats from pollution and habitat degradation.

However, despite their stability, California morays have still been the subject of conservation efforts. A recent study has connected the conservation efforts in Marine Protected Areas (MPAs) to ecological impacts on California moray populations. Within MPAs, California morays were found to be longer, older, heavier, had higher body condition, and were found in greater abundance. However, too great of an abundance was also connected to higher frequencies of cannibalism, the presence of disease, and lower growth rates.
