= Ligur =

Ligur may refer to:

- Roman cognomen
- Ligur (shrimp), an arthropod genus in the family Lysmatidae
- Ligures (singular Ligus or Ligur; English: Ligurians, Greek: Λίγυες), an ancient people who gave their name to Liguria

== See also ==
- Liger
