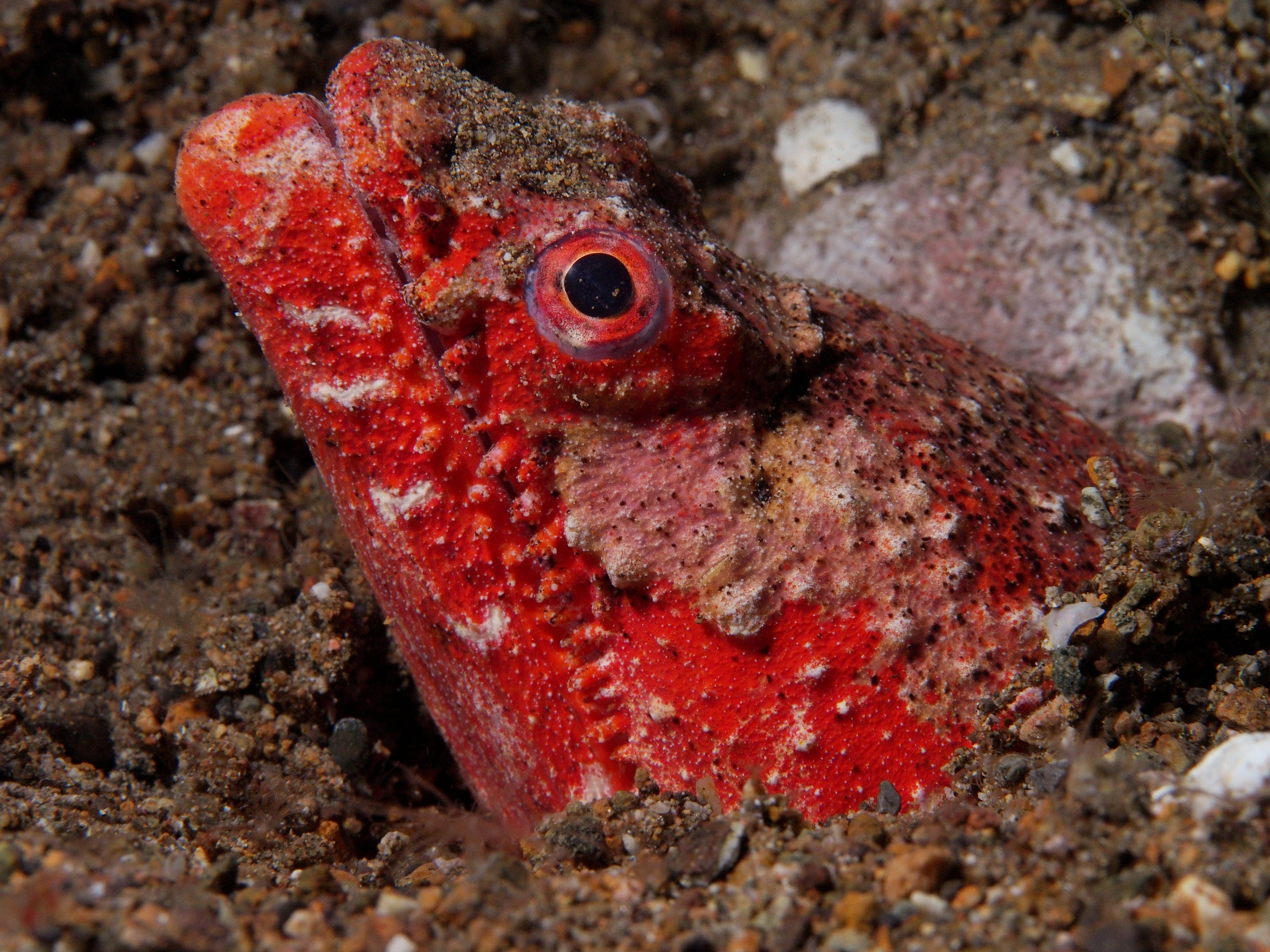

Scientific classification
- Domain: Eukaryota
- Kingdom: Animalia
- Phylum: Chordata
- Class: Actinopterygii
- Order: Anguilliformes
- Family: Ophichthidae
- Genus: Brachysomophis
- Species: B. henshawi

Binomial name
- Brachysomophis henshawi D. S. Jordan & Snyder, 1904

= Reptilian snake eel =

Species of fish

The reptilian snake eel (Brachysomophis henshawi), also known as Henshaw's snake eel, the Hawaiian crocodile eel or the crocodile snake eel, is an eel in the family Ophichthidae (worm/snake eels). It was described by David Starr Jordan and John Otterbein Snyder in 1904.

== Biology ==
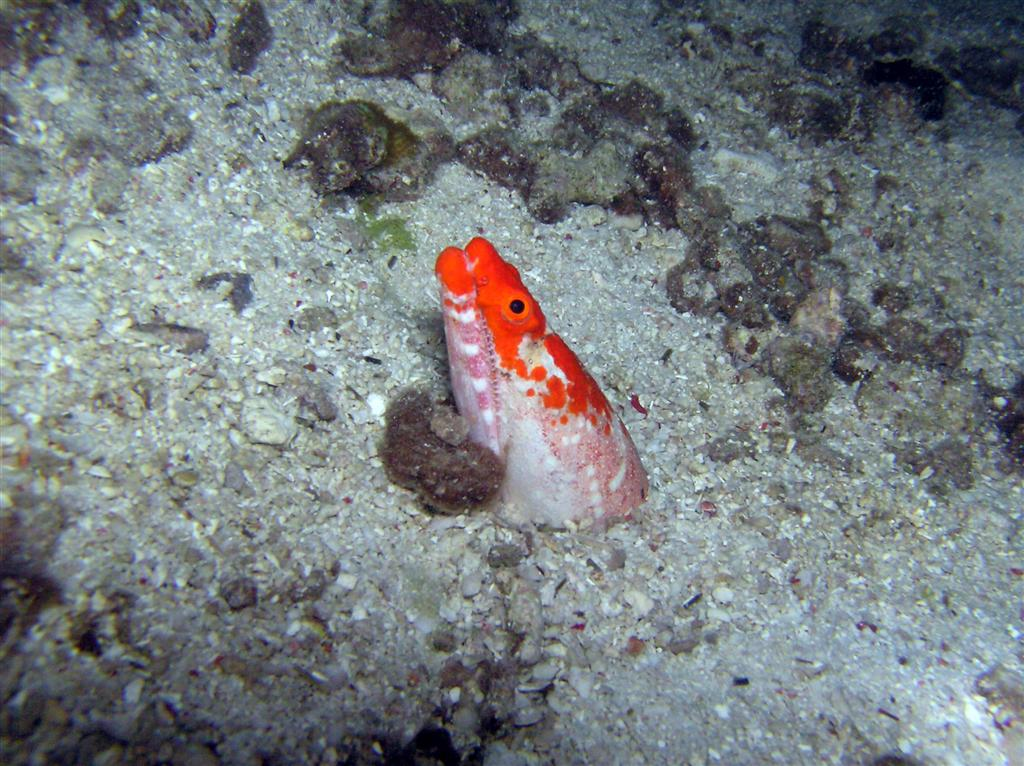
Brachysomophis henshawi in Panglao Island, Philippines

It is a marine, tropical eel which is known from the Indo-Pacific. It dwells at a depth range of 1 to 35 m (3.3–114.8 ft), and inhabits burrows formed in sandy areas in rocky and coral reefs. During the night it often lets its head and neck protrude from its burrow, but during the day it only leaves its snout and some of its head exposed. It can reach a maximum total length of 101 cm (3 ft 4 in).

== Etymology ==
The species epithet "henshawi" was given in honour of Henry W. Henshaw.
