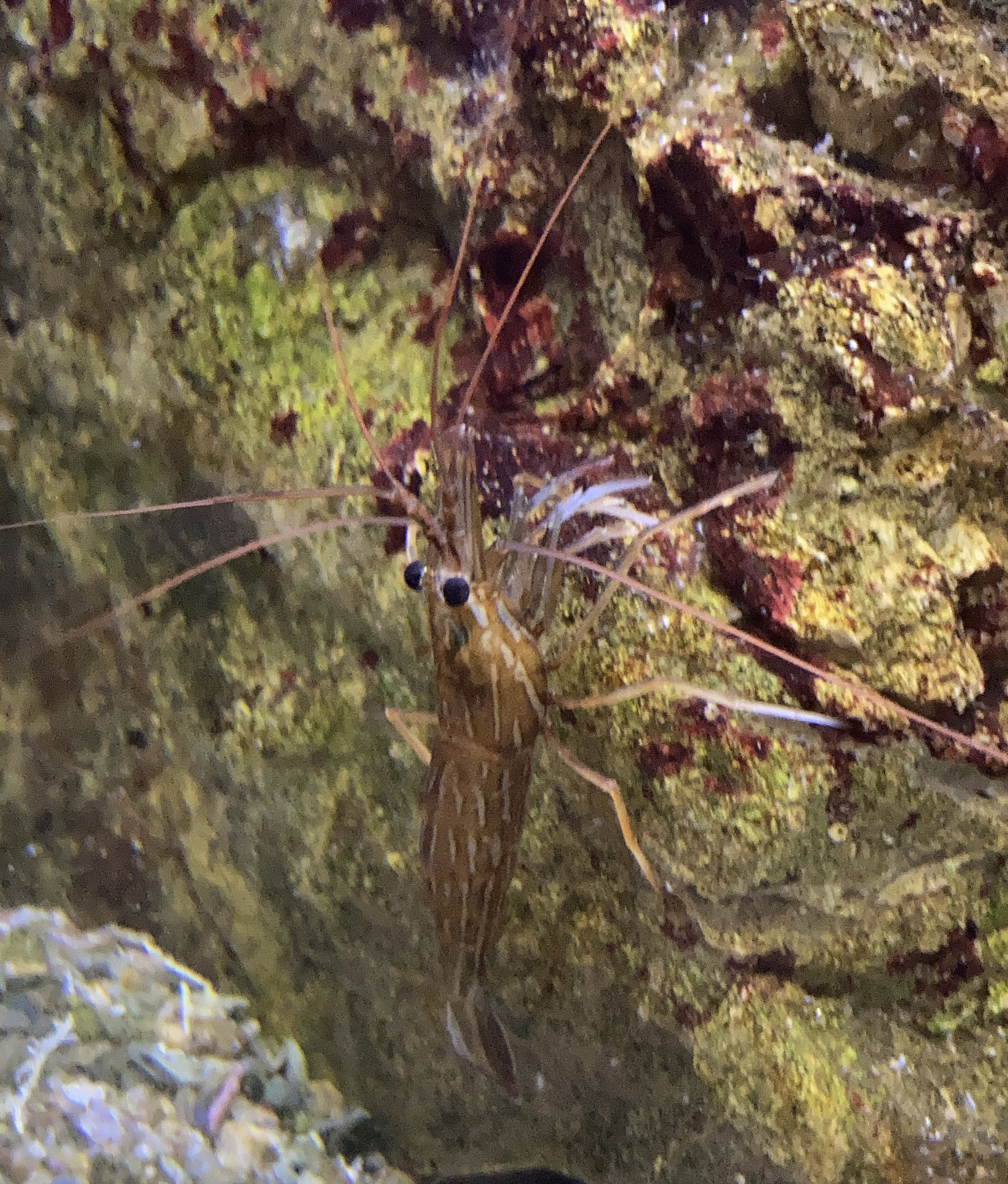
- Lysmata californica at the California Science Center

Scientific classification
- Kingdom: Animalia
- Phylum: Arthropoda
- Clade: Pancrustacea
- Class: Malacostraca
- Order: Decapoda
- Suborder: Pleocyemata
- Infraorder: Caridea
- Family: Lysmatidae
- Genus: Lysmata
- Species: L. californica

Binomial name
- Lysmata californica (Stimpson, 1866)

Synonyms
- Hippolysmata californica Stimpson, 1866; Hippolyte lineata Lockington, 1877

= Lysmata californica =

Species of crustacean

Lysmata californica, known generally as the red rock shrimp or lined shrimp, is a species of caridean shrimp in the family Hippolytidae. It belongs to the Lysmata genus which includes other Cleaner Shrimp and Peppermint Shrimp. It is found in the East Pacific.

== Range ==
Lysmata californica is native to the East Pacific Ocean with a range from Southern California to Mexico. In some years, some L. californica have also been noted occurring much farther north in areas such as Monterey. L. californica has also been observed in New Zealand as an invasive species.

== Biology ==
Lysmata californica generally lives in shallower water in shallow rocky areas or intertidal pools, but has been found in the open water. They grow up to a length of 3 inches. Red Rock Shrimp are often a reddish color with broken white stripes running parallel along the length of its body. Spawning primarily occurs in early summer months with eggs appearing red earlier on and green once they mature.

L. californica females are outcrossing simultaneous hermaphrodites, meaning they possess both sexual organs but mate with other individuals. L. californica develops first in the male phase, transitioning to the female phase post-molt while retaining male genital organs.

Lysmata californica are cleaning shrimp, often exhibiting this behavior with California morays. As cleaning shrimp , they eat by cleaning debris and organic matter off other larger animals, rocks, or carcasses. It was found that cleaning and feeding activity of L. californica increases with temperature, whereas increased acidification reduces feeding activity.

== Conservation ==
California supports a Lysmata californica fishery, being frequently used for bait. Red Rock shrimp are trapped often along rocky coastal areas, however their population has not seen significant changes in recent years.
