= Turret snake eel =

Scientific classification
- Domain: Eukaryota
- Kingdom: Animalia
- Phylum: Chordata
- Class: Actinopterygii
- Order: Anguilliformes
- Family: Ophichthidae
- Genus: Brachysomophis
- Species: B. umbonis

Binomial name
- Brachysomophis umbonis J. E. McCosker & J. E. Randall, 2001

Species of fish

The turret snake eel (Brachysomophis umbonis) is an eel in the family Ophichthidae (worm/snake eels). It was described by John E. McCosker and John Ernest Randall in 2001. It is a marine, tropical eel which is known from the Indo-Western Pacific, including Indonesia and the Philippines. It dwells at a depth range of 14 to 18 metres (46 to 59 ft), and inhabits sand and reefs. Males can reach a maximum total length of 13.9 centimetres (5.5 in).

The species epithet, "umbonis", meaning "rounded protuberance" in Latin, refers to the prominent lateral projections of the eel's cheeks.
