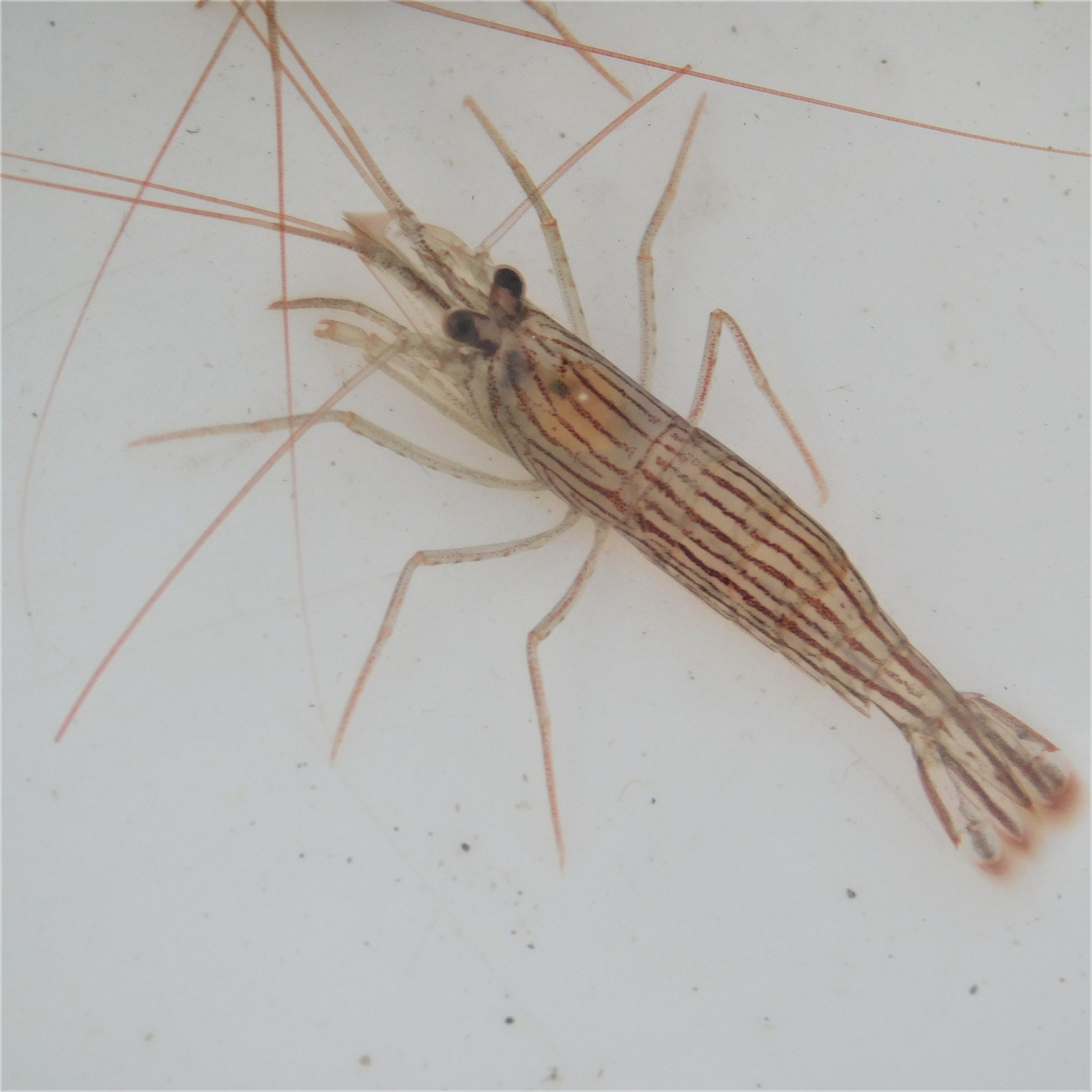

Scientific classification
- Kingdom: Animalia
- Phylum: Arthropoda
- Class: Malacostraca
- Order: Decapoda
- Suborder: Pleocyemata
- Infraorder: Caridea
- Family: Lysmatidae
- Genus: Lysmata
- Species: L. vittata

Binomial name
- Lysmata vittata (Stimpson, 1860)

Synonyms
- Hippolysmata vittata Stimpson, 1860; Nauticaris unirecedens Bate, 1888; Hippolysmata durbanensis Stebbing, 1921

= Lysmata vittata =

Species of crustacean

Lysmata vittata, commonly known as the peppermint shrimp, is a species of shrimp, native to the Indo-Pacific from East Africa to the Philippines, Japan, Australia and New Zealand.

Lysmata vittata has been suggested as a cleaner shrimp species in aquaculture. This species has been shown to successfully remove different parasite species from the orange-spotted grouper (Epinephelus coioides) fish hosts as well as free living stages of Cryptocaryon irritans. Out of four species of clear shrimp that were compared it was the most effective in reducing parasite numbers.
