= Brachysomophis longipinnis =

Scientific classification
- Domain: Eukaryota
- Kingdom: Animalia
- Phylum: Chordata
- Class: Actinopterygii
- Order: Anguilliformes
- Family: Ophichthidae
- Genus: Brachysomophis
- Species: B. longipinnis

Binomial name
- Brachysomophis longipinnis J. E. McCosker & J. E. Randall, 2001

Species of fish

Brachysomophis longipinnis is an eel in the family Ophichthidae (worm/snake eels). It was described by John E. McCosker and John Ernest Randall in 2001. It is a marine, temperate water-dwelling eel which is known from a single specimen collected from Taiwan, in the northwestern Pacific Ocean. It is known to dwell at a depth of 50 metres, and is known to reach a total length of 42.1 centimetres.

The species epithet "longipinnis" is derived from the Latin words "longus" and "pinnus", and means "long fin". The IUCN redlist currently lists the species as Data Deficient, due to the extremely limited number of specimens recorded.
