= Brachysomophis porphyreus =

Scientific classification
- Domain: Eukaryota
- Kingdom: Animalia
- Phylum: Chordata
- Class: Actinopterygii
- Order: Anguilliformes
- Family: Ophichthidae
- Genus: Brachysomophis
- Species: B. porphyreus

Binomial name
- Brachysomophis porphyreus (Temminck & Schlegel, 1846)

Synonyms
- Ophisurus porphyreus Temminck & Schlegel, 1846; Mystriophis porphyreus (Temminck & Schlegel, 1846); Ophichthys adspersus Günther, 1870

Species of fish

Brachysomophis porphyreus is an eel in the family Ophichthidae (worm/snake eels). It was described by Coenraad Jacob Temminck and Hermann Schlegel in 1846. It is a marine, temperate water-dwelling eel which is known from the northwestern Pacific Ocean, including Taiwan, China, Japan, and Korea. It is known to dwell at a depth of 20 metres, and makes burrows in mud, nearly deep enough to cover itself completely. Males can reach a maximum total length of 130 centimetres.

The species epithet "porphyreus" refers to the purple colouring of living specimens.
