= Brachysomophis atlanticus =

Scientific classification
- Domain: Eukaryota
- Kingdom: Animalia
- Phylum: Chordata
- Class: Actinopterygii
- Order: Anguilliformes
- Family: Ophichthidae
- Genus: Brachysomophis
- Species: B. atlanticus

Binomial name
- Brachysomophis atlanticus Blache & Saldanha, 1972

Species of fish

Brachysomophis atlanticus is an eel in the family Ophichthidae (worm/snake eels). It was described by Jacques Blache and Luiz Vieria Caldas Saldanha in 1972. It is a tropical, marine eel which is known from the eastern Atlantic Ocean (from which its species epithet is derived), including Senegal and the Gulf of Guinea. It inhabits the continental shelf, and makes burrows in sand and mud. Males can reach a maximum total length of 27.3 centimetres.
