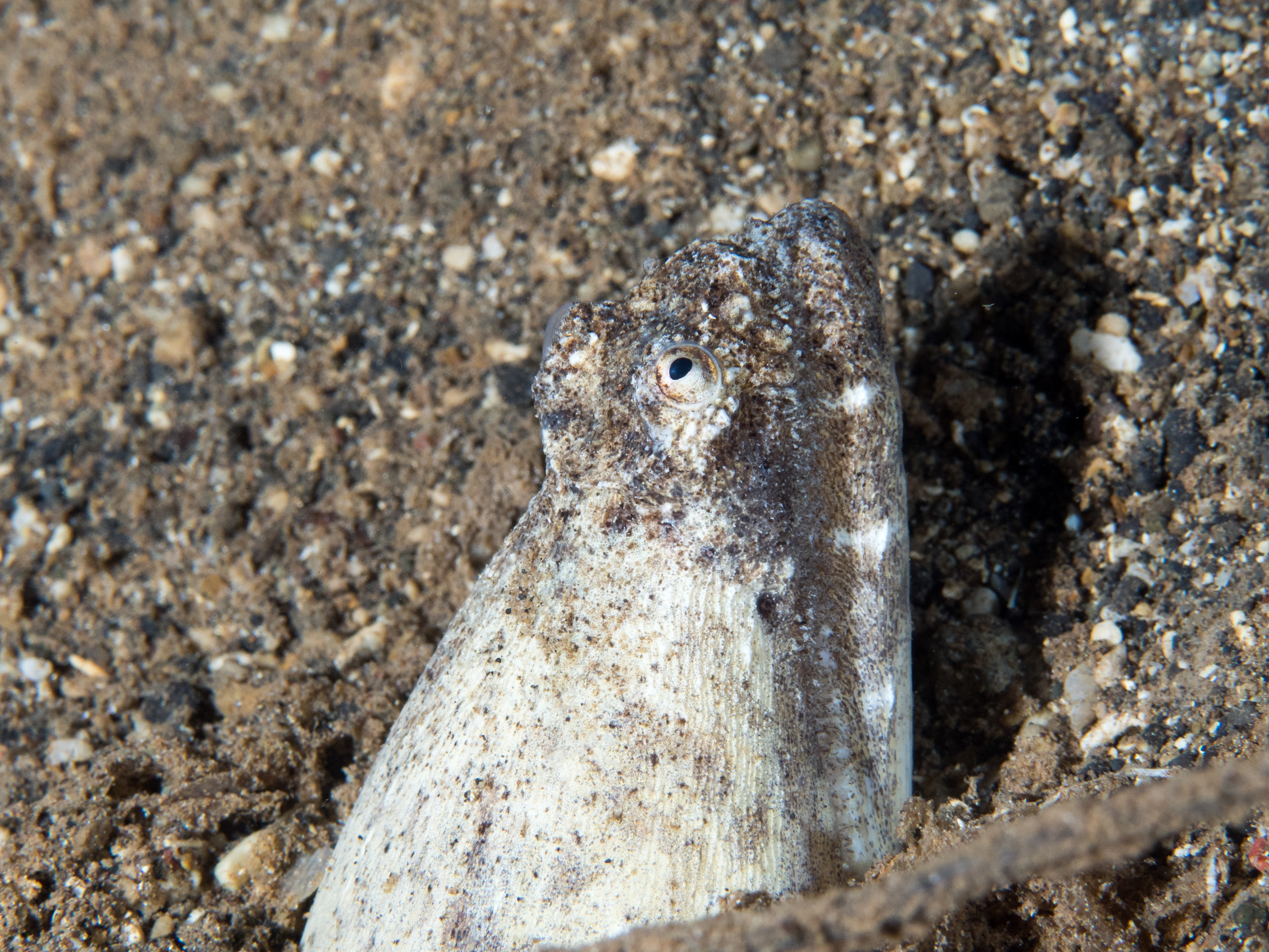

Scientific classification
- Kingdom: Animalia
- Phylum: Chordata
- Class: Actinopterygii
- Order: Anguilliformes
- Family: Ophichthidae
- Genus: Brachysomophis
- Species: B. crocodilinus

Binomial name
- Brachysomophis crocodilinus (E. T. Bennett, 1833)

Synonyms
- Ophisurus crocodilinus Bennett, 1833; Ophichthys crocodilinus (Bennett, 1833); Brachysonophis crocodilinus (Bennett, 1833); Brachysomophis horridus Kaup, 1856; Achirophichthys typus Bleeker, 1864; Brachysomophis sauropsis Schultz, 1943

= Crocodile snake eel =

Species of fish

The crocodile snake eel (Brachysomophis crocodilinus) is an eel in the family Ophichthidae (worm/snake eels). In 1833, it was described by Edward Turner Bennett. It is a tropical, marine eel known from the Indo-Pacific, including East Africa, the Society Islands, Japan, and Australia. The crocodile snake eel is used in Chinese medicine.

== Description ==
The crocodile snake eel typically has a short snout, long jaw and a flesh above and behind the eyes. Their bodies have designs that help them to camouflage with its environment (sand, coral debris etc.) which allows them to burrow themselves into sand and be hidden. Males can reach a maximum length of 120 centimeters. The species epithet "crocodilinus", as well as the common name, refer to the species crocodilian appearance.

== Distribution and habitat ==
The crocodile snake eel can be found in the Indo-Pacific, including East Africa, the Society Islands, Japan, and Australia. They are found in mud bottoms or in the sand at a depth range of 0–30 meters (most often around 0–2 m). They are not normally seen but occasionally at night you can see them on the surface. They usually burrow in the sand and wait to ambush prey, often leaving their eyes exposed. Their diet consists of octopuses, a species of Calcarina, and finfish.
