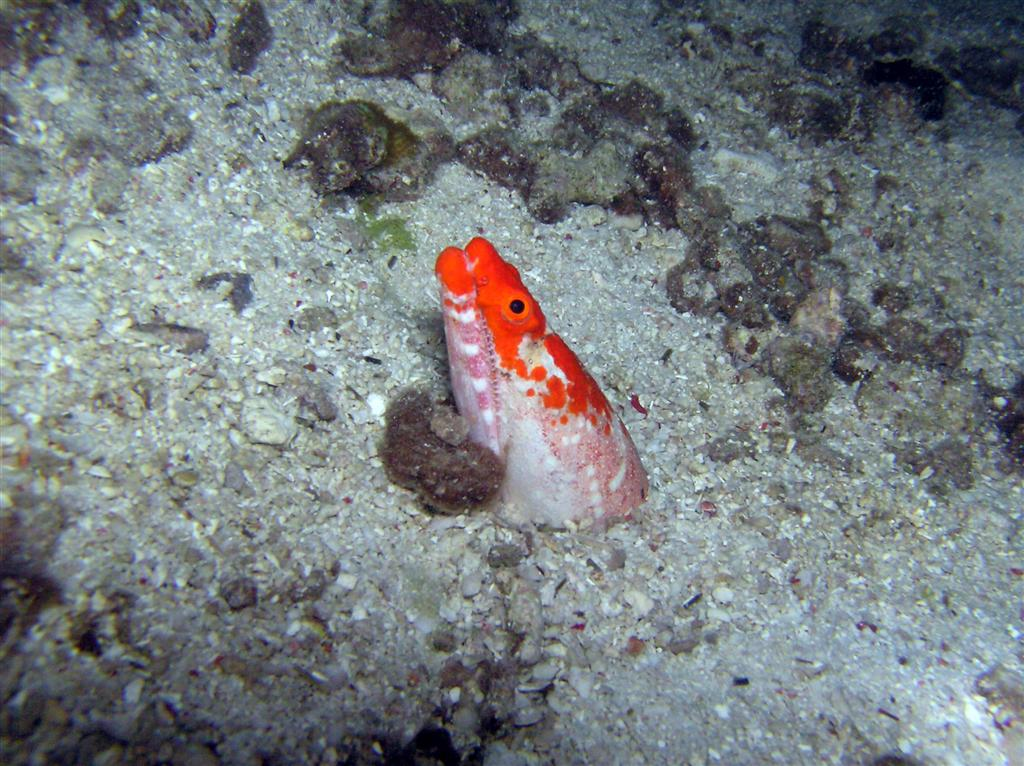
- Brachysomophis henshawi in Panglao Island, Philippines

Scientific classification
- Kingdom: Animalia
- Phylum: Chordata
- Class: Actinopterygii
- Order: Anguilliformes
- Family: Ophichthidae
- Subfamily: Ophichthinae
- Genus: Brachysomophis; Kaup, 1856

Type species
- Brachysomophis horridus Kaup, 1856

= Brachysomophis =

Genus of fishes

Brachysomophis is a genus of eels in the snake eel family Ophichthidae.

== Species ==
There are currently 7 recognized species in this genus:

- Brachysomophis atlanticus Blache & Saldanha, 1972
- Brachysomophis cirrocheilos (Bleeker, 1857) (Stargazer snake-eel)
- Brachysomophis crocodilinus (E. T. Bennett, 1833) (Crocodile snake-eel)
- Brachysomophis henshawi D. S. Jordan & Snyder, 1904 (Reptilian snake-eel)
- Brachysomophis longipinnis J. E. McCosker & J. E. Randall, 2001 (Sharp-fanged snake eel)
- Brachysomophis porphyreus (Temminck & Schlegel, 1846)
- Brachysomophis umbonis J. E. McCosker & J. E. Randall, 2001
