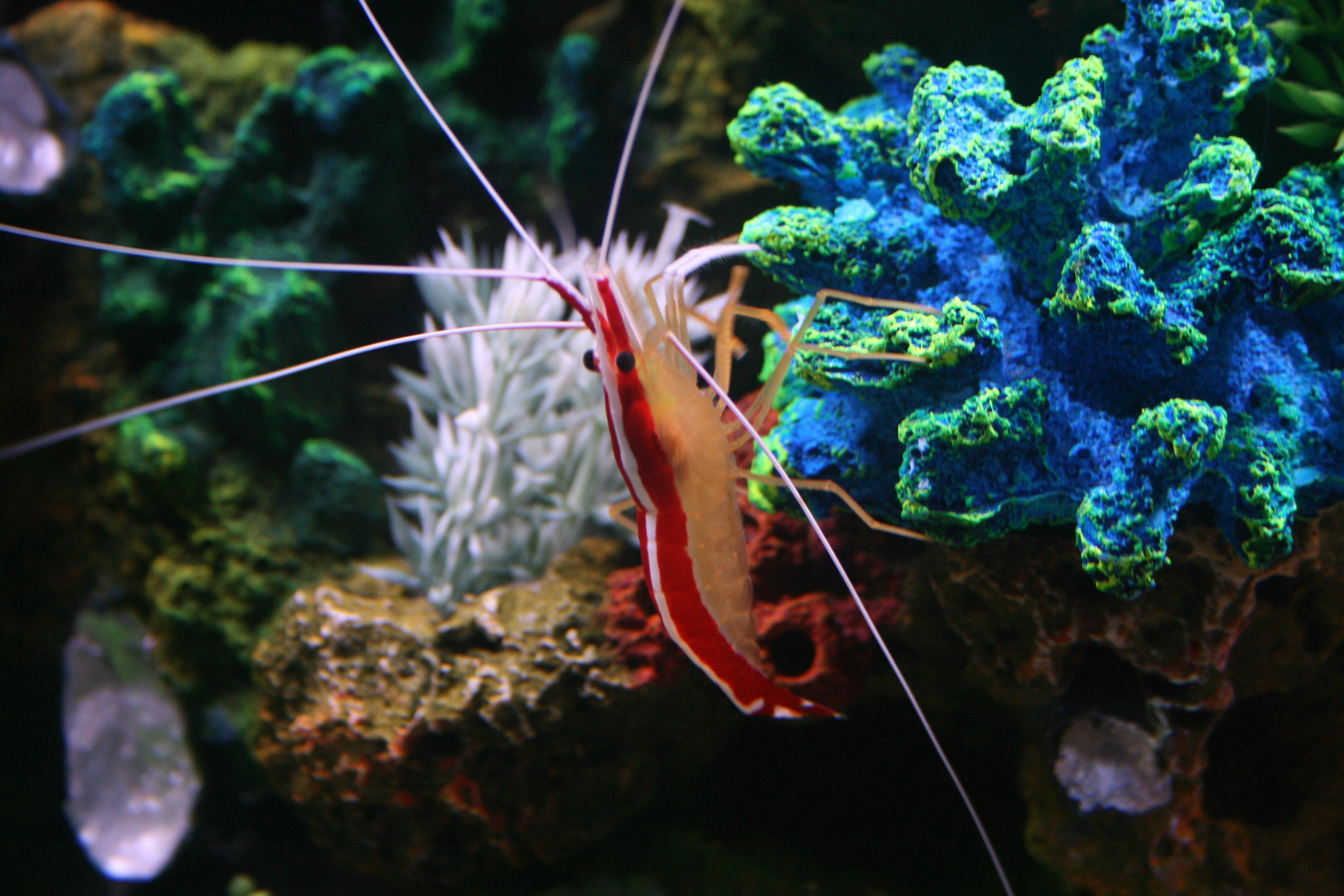
- Lysmata amboinensis

Scientific classification
- Kingdom: Animalia
- Phylum: Arthropoda
- Clade: Pancrustacea
- Class: Malacostraca
- Order: Decapoda
- Suborder: Pleocyemata
- Infraorder: Caridea
- Family: Lysmatidae
- Genus: Lysmata; Risso, 1816

Type species
- Lysmata seticaudata (Risso, 1816)

Synonyms
- List: Aglaope Rafinesque, 1814; Arno Roux, 1831; Eretmocaris Spence Bate, 1888; Hippolysmata Stimpson, 1860; Hippolysmata (Hippolysmata) Stimpson, 1860; Melicerta Risso, 1816; Niphea Rafinesque, 1815; Opithiocheirus Leach, 1830; Usterocheirus Leach, 1830

= Lysmata =

Genus of crustaceans

Lysmata is a genus of shrimp in the infraorder Caridea, the caridean shrimp. The genus belongs to the family Lysmatidae. Lysmata are popular ornamental shrimp in the marine aquarium trade for their bright color patterns, interesting behaviors, and ability to control certain aquarium pests such as sea anemones of the genus Aiptasia. They are known to command high prices on the pet market.

The genus is informally divided into two main categories. Some species are cleaner shrimp which "clean" parasites and other material from fish, live in pairs, and are brightly colored, often in contrasting reds and yellows with white antennae. Other species are the "peppermint shrimp", which have semi-translucent, red-banded bodies, and live in large groups. Some peppermint shrimp perform cleaning behaviors, but less actively than do the cleaner shrimp.

The genus has been studied with interest due to its unusual sexual system, protandric simultaneous hermaphroditism. While some other taxa of shrimp undergo sequential hermaphroditism, they have only been observed changing from male to female. In Lysmata, males become true hermaphrodites instead of females. So far, every species studied has been confirmed to have this sexual system. During their "female phase" they actually have functioning male and female tissues in their gonads and produce both types of gamete. When paired, they take turns fertilizing each other's eggs.

Lysmata occur in the tropics and in warmer temperate waters. They usually live on rock and coral reefs, in shallow and deeper areas. Some live in sponges.

== Species ==
The following species are recognised in the genus Lysmata:

- Lysmata amboinensis (De Man, 1888)
- Lysmata anchisteus Chace, 1972
- Lysmata ankeri Rhyne & Lin, 2006
- Lysmata argentopunctata Wicksten, 2000
- Lysmata bahia Rhyne & Lin, 2006
- Lysmata baueri Prakash & Baeza, 2017
- Lysmata boggessi Rhyne & Lin, 2006
- Lysmata brevrostrus Wang & Sha, 2018
- Lysmata californica (Stimpson, 1866)
- Lysmata chica Wicksten, 2000
- Lysmata debelius Bruce, 1983
- Lysmata dispar Hayashi, 2008
- Lysmata durbanensis (Stebbing, 1921)
- Lysmata elisa Guéron, Baeza, Bochini, Terossi & Almeida, 2023
- Lysmata galapagensis Schmitt, 1924
- Lysmata grabhami (Gordon, 1935)
- Lysmata gracilirostris Wicksten, 2000
- Lysmata guamensis Anker & Cox, 2011
- Lysmata hochi Baeza & Anker, 2008
- Lysmata holthuisi Anker, Baeza & De Grave, 2009
- Lysmata intermedia (Kingsley, 1878)
- Lysmata jundalini Rhyne, Calado & dos Santos, 2012
- Lysmata kempi Chace, 1997
- Lysmata kuekenthali (De Man, 1902)
- Lysmata leptodactylus Gan & X Li, 2016
- Lysmata lipkei Okuno & Fiedler, 2010
- Lysmata malagasy Ashrafi, Baeza & Ďuriš, 2021
- Lysmata moorei (Rathbun, 1901)
- Lysmata morelandi (Yaldwyn, 1971)
- Lysmata multiscissa (Nobili, 1904)
- Lysmata napoleoni De Grave & Anker, 2018
- Lysmata nayaritensis Wicksten, 2000
- Lysmata nilita Dohrn & Holthuis, 1950
- Lysmata olavoi Fransen, 1991
- Lysmata parvispinosus Wang & Sha, 2018
- Lysmata pederseni Rhyne & Lin, 2006
- Lysmata philippinensis Chace, 1997
- Lysmata porteri (Rathbun, 1907)
- Lysmata rafa Rhyne & Anker, 2007
- Lysmata rathbunae Chace, 1970
- Lysmata rauli Laubenheimer & Rhyne, 2010
- Lysmata seticaudata (Risso, 1816)
- Lysmata splendida Burukovsky, 2000
- Lysmata stenolepis Crosnier & Forest, 1973
- Lysmata ternatensis De Man, 1902
- Lysmata trisetacea (Heller, 1861)
- Lysmata udoi Baeza, Bolaños, Hernandez & López, 2009
- Lysmata uncicornis Holthuis & Maurin, 1952
- Lysmata vittata (Stimpson, 1860)
- Lysmata wurdemanni (Gibbes, 1850)
- Lysmata zacae Armstrong, 1941
