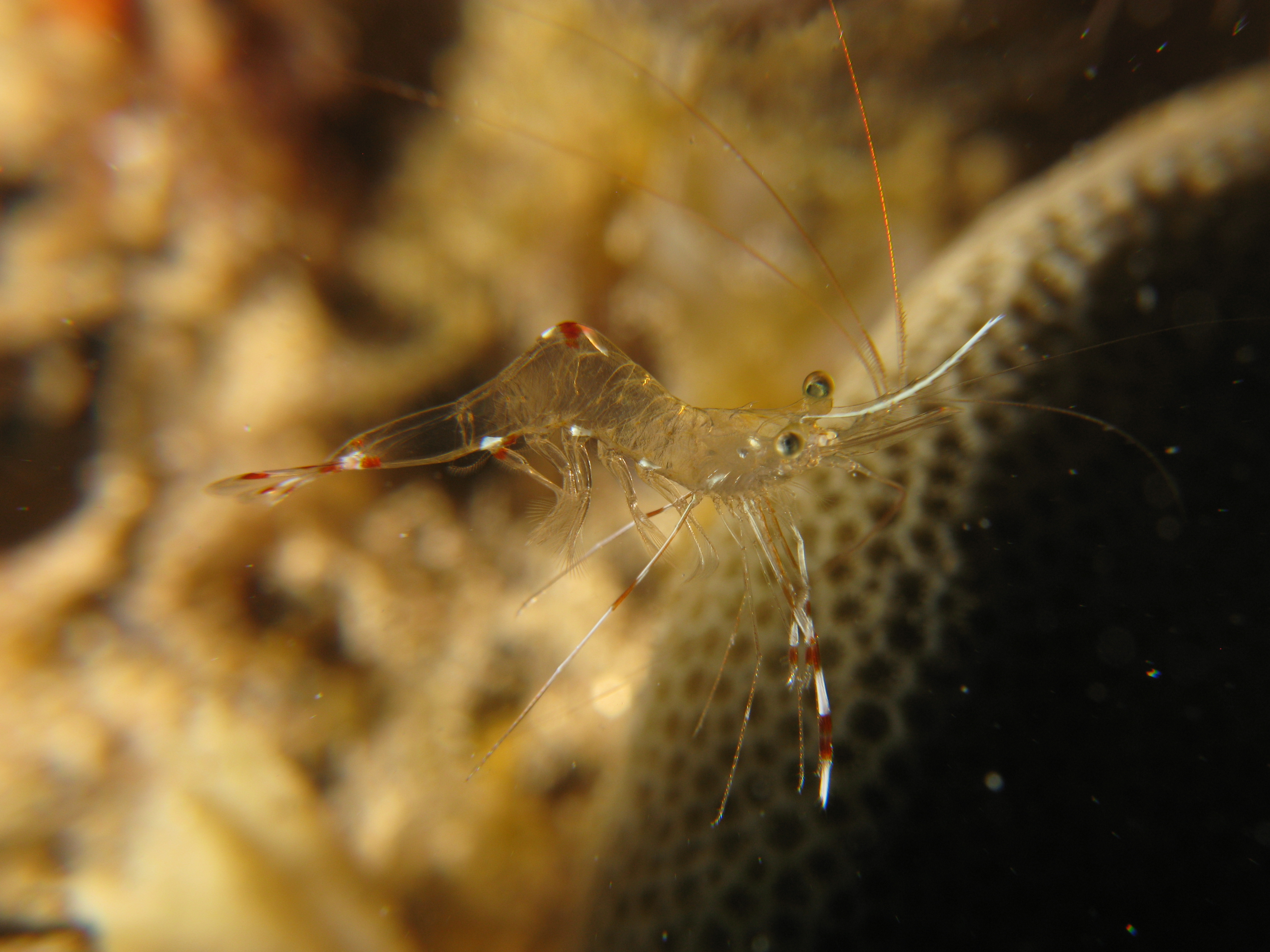
- Urocaridella antonbruunii

Scientific classification
- Domain: Eukaryota
- Kingdom: Animalia
- Phylum: Arthropoda
- Class: Malacostraca
- Order: Decapoda
- Suborder: Pleocyemata
- Infraorder: Caridea
- Family: Palaemonidae
- Genus: Urocaridella; Borradaile, 1915

Type species
- Urocaridella urocaridella Holthuis, 1950

= Urocaridella =

Genus of crustaceans

Urocaridella is a genus of shrimps comprising the following species:

- Urocaridella antonbruunii (Bruce, 1967)
- Urocaridella cyrtorhyncha (Fujino & Miyake, 1969)
- Urocaridella degravei Prakash & Baeza, 2018
- Urocaridella liui (Wang, Chan & Sha, 2015)
- Urocaridella pulchella Yokes & Galil, 2006
- Urocaridella urocaridella (Holthuis, 1950)
- Urocaridella vestigialis Chace & Bruce, 1993
