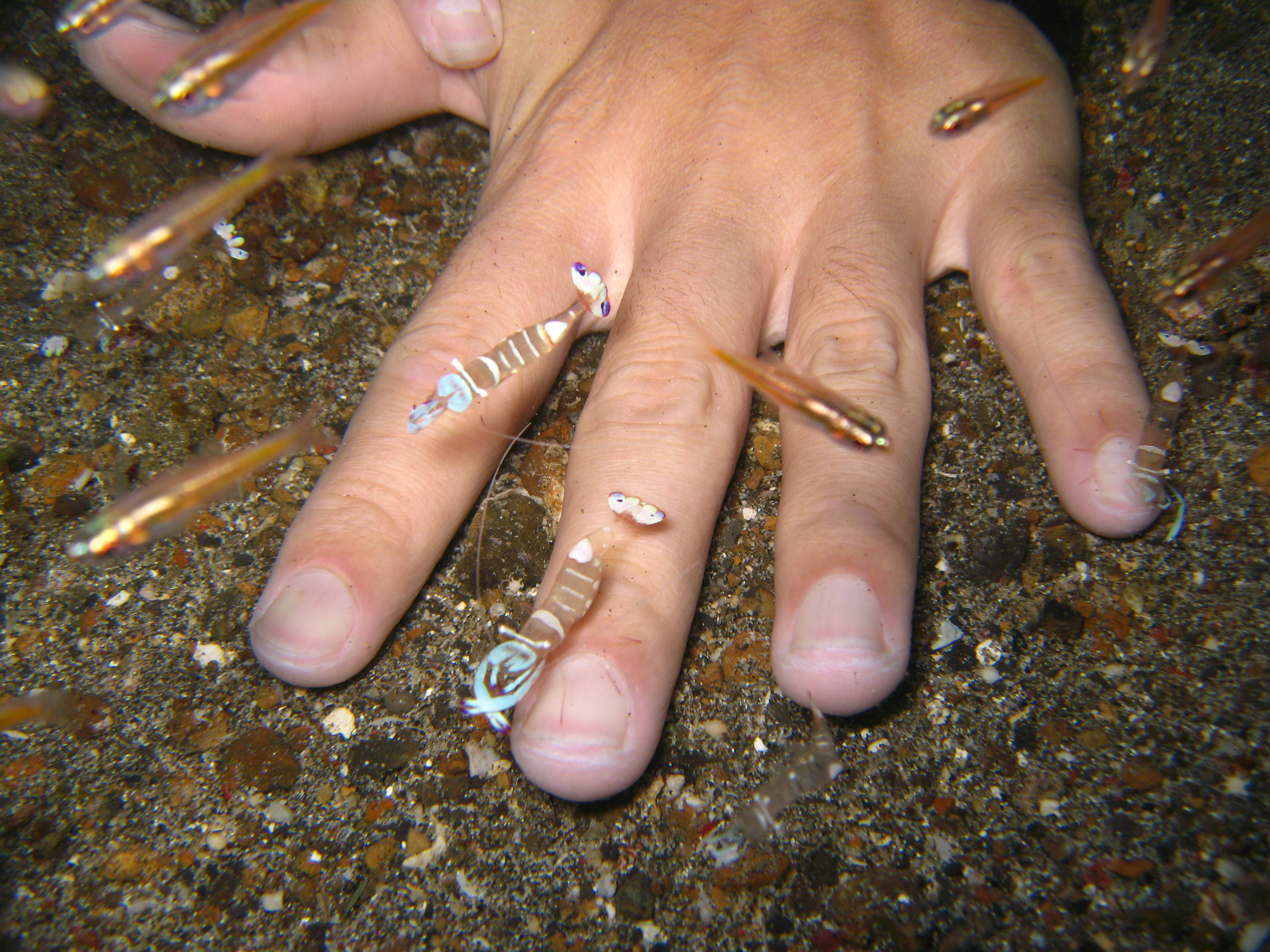

Scientific classification
- Kingdom: Animalia
- Phylum: Arthropoda
- Class: Malacostraca
- Order: Decapoda
- Suborder: Pleocyemata
- Infraorder: Caridea
- Family: Palaemonidae
- Genus: Ancylomenes
- Species: A. magnificus

Binomial name
- Ancylomenes magnificus (Bruce, 1979)

Synonyms
- Periclimenes magnificus Bruce, 1979

= Ancylomenes magnificus =

Species of crustacean

Ancylomenes magnificus, also known as the magnificent anemone shrimp, is a species of cleaner shrimp common to the Western Pacific Ocean at depths of 3–29 metres (10–95 ft). They are commonly found on stony coral, Catalaphyllia and the sea anemone, Dofleinia armata.

== Morphology ==
As an arthropod, A. magnificus, is segmented and bilaterally symmetrical. The body of the shrimp contains a hard external skeleton, called an exoskeleton, made of chitin which periodically molts by a process called ecdysis.

A. magnificus, has a compressed body composed of a cephalothorax, containing a head and a thorax attached to an elongated abdomen. It has five pairs of pereiopods, two pair of antennae, a mandible, and three pairs of maxillipeds.

Most of A. magnificus have a transparent body, except on the carapace and segments of the abdomen, which have bands of white specks outlined in red. The tail and the hump on the abdomen are also white.

== Reproduction ==
As other shrimps in the family Palaemonidae, A. magnificus, are gonochoric species. After molting, the female's exoskeleton is soft. During this time, the male is able to transfer a spermatophore to the female's exoskeleton. This allows the female to produce a large amount of eggs, which she carries under her abdomen.

The female carries the eggs until they hatch. The eggs hatch into larvae form and then go through a series of transformations to become adult shrimps. A. magnificus grows up to 2.5 cm (1 in.) in size.

== Feeding and digestion ==
Shrimps are typically scavengers, feeding on detritus at the bottom of the ocean. Other shrimps are filter feeders, which allows them to eat small food particles.

A. magnificus as part of the subphylum Crustacea, possesses a mouth to ingest food, which then passes through to be broken down by chitinous teeth that line the stomach. The stomach is connected to digestive glands, which secrete enzymes that absorb the nutrients of the food. Lastly, the digestion ends in the anus.

== Relationship with its environment ==
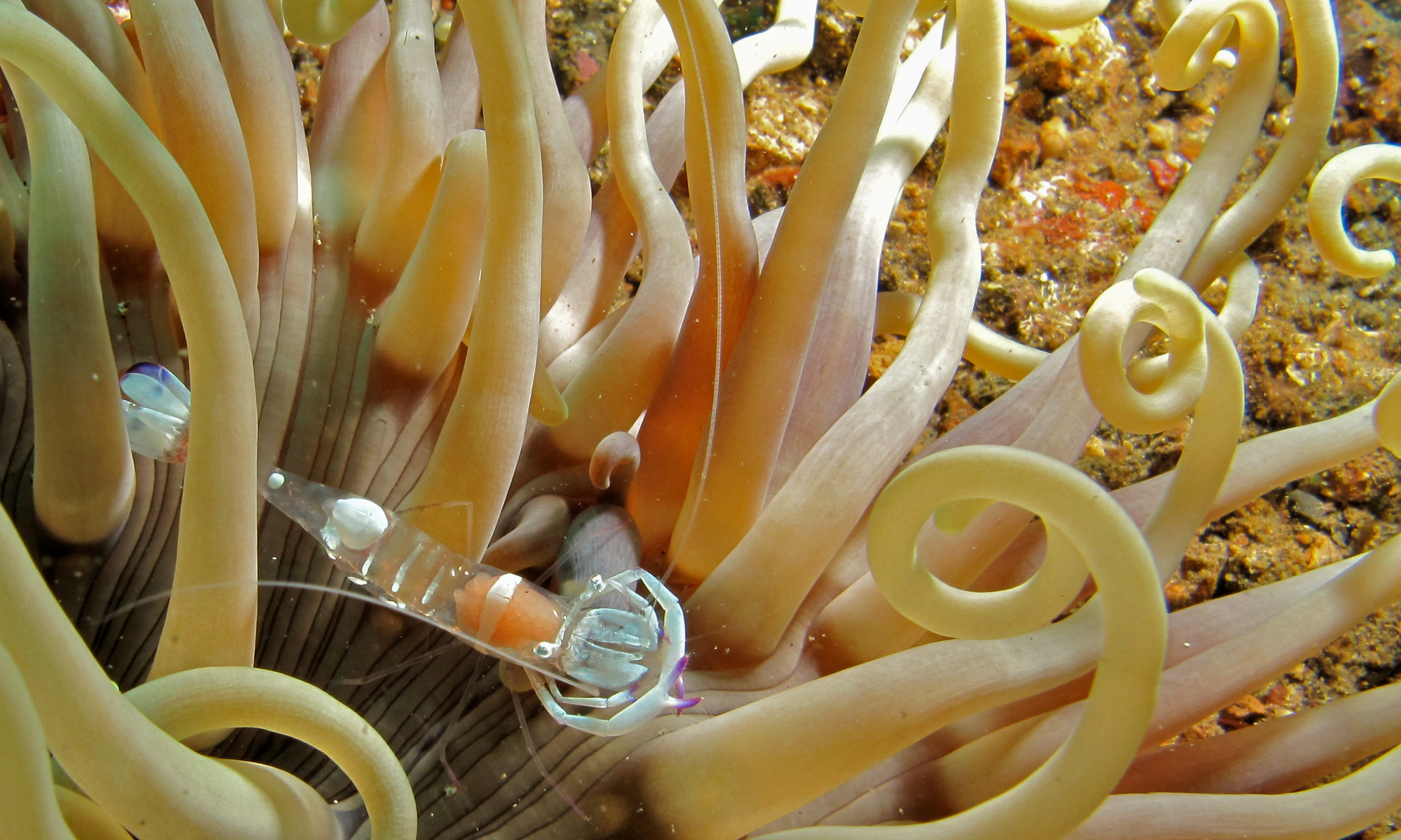

As with many shrimps of the Infraorder Caridea, cleaner shrimps have shown a symbiotic relationships with sponges, cnidarians, mollusks, fish, and other species. These relationships, in most cases, can be seen as mutualistic because cleaner shrimps provide their services, such as cleaning services and nitrogen excretion, while the other species provide the cleaner shrimp protection from predators and sometimes a food source. In these types of relationships, both species work together to benefit one another. Some cleaner shrimps, like, A. magnificus, are relatively small and vulnerable to live by themselves, therefore, they need other organisms to live, such as sea anemones or stony corals.
