= Urocaridella pulchella =

Scientific classification
- Domain: Eukaryota
- Kingdom: Animalia
- Phylum: Arthropoda
- Class: Malacostraca
- Order: Decapoda
- Suborder: Pleocyemata
- Infraorder: Caridea
- Family: Palaemonidae
- Genus: Urocaridella
- Species: U. pulchella

Binomial name
- Urocaridella pulchella Yokes & Galil, 2006

Species of shrimp

Urocaridella pulchella is a species of shrimp in the family Palaemonidae. Among other places, it is found in the waters near Turkey's coasts.
