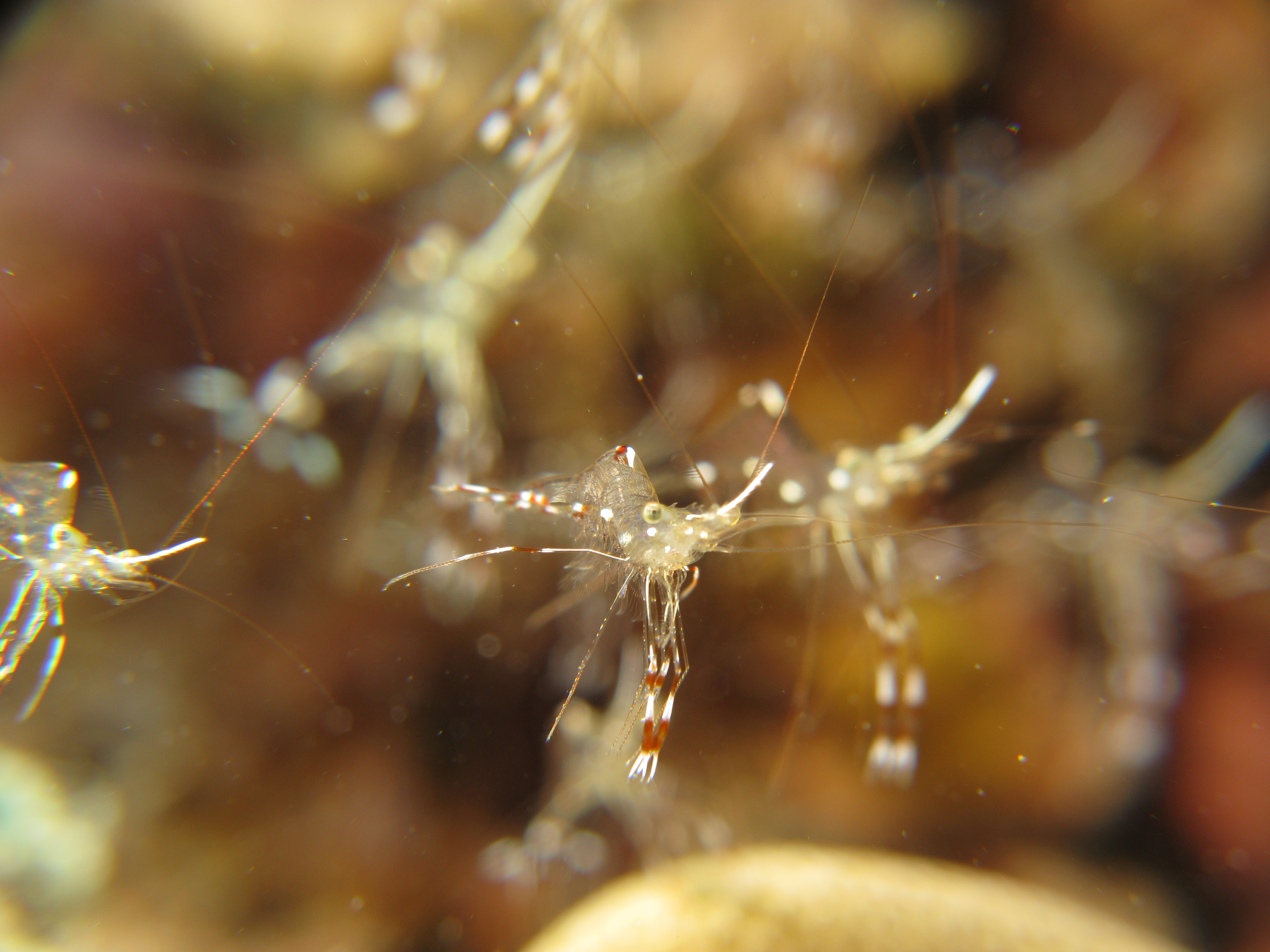

Scientific classification
- Kingdom: Animalia
- Phylum: Arthropoda
- Class: Malacostraca
- Order: Decapoda
- Suborder: Pleocyemata
- Infraorder: Caridea
- Family: Palaemonidae
- Genus: Urocaridella
- Species: U. antonbruunii

Binomial name
- Urocaridella antonbruunii (A. J. Bruce, 1967)

Synonyms
- Periclimenes antonbruunii Bruce, 1967; Leandrites cyrtorhynchus Fujino & Miyake, 1969

= Urocaridella antonbruunii =

Species of crustacean

Urocaridella antonbruunii, common names clear cleaner shrimp or red-white cleaner shrimp, is a species of shrimp belonging to the family Palaemonidae. It was described by A. J. Bruce in 1967. It is one of the species that are known as cleaner shrimps.

== Distribution and habitat ==
This species has a wide distribution throughout the Western Central Indo-Pacific, from Maldives to Thailand, Indonesia, Philippines, Taiwan, Papua-New Guinea up to Fiji and Hawaii These shrimps occur in tropical shallow waters in coral reef environment, at depths of 2 to 66 m (7 to 217 ft), where they can found their preferred hosts.

== Description ==
U. antonbruunii cleans the pufferfish Arothron meleagris in Maldives. Video clip

Urocaridella antonbruunii can reach a body length of about 25–30 mm (0.98–1.18 in). Like the other species of the genus Urocaridella, have very long rostrums curved upwards, transparent bodies, and numerous brightly-coloured red and yellow spots on the carapace and abdomen. Internal organs clearly visible. The translucency provides an effective form of camouflage. The abdomen forms a characteristic right angle where there is a red spot preceded by a white spot. The antennae are long and transparent, but are not white, as is the case in many species of cleaning shrimp. The pereiopods (swimming legs) are banded in red and white. The pleopods under the abdomen are beaten rapidly to move the shrimp towards the client fish, making the shrimp appear to hover.

== Biology and behaviour ==
Urocaridella antonbruunii is gonochoric. Commonly these shrimps perform a precopulatory courtship ritual. They are cleaner shrimps, because of their habit of removing external parasites from client fish. This is the first shrimp reported cleaning sleeping rabbitfish Siganus canaliculatus at night.

These shrimps also exhibit stereotypical behaviour to attract their clients. They position themselves in a conspicuous location near their cleaning station when a potential client is nearby. They feed on parasites and mucus that they find on the host during the cleaning sessions but also capture copepods, small microorganisms and debris on the bottom.

== Bibliography ==
- Bruce, A.J., 1967b. Notes on some Indo-Pacific Pontoniinae III-IX. Descriptions of some new genera and species from the western Indian Ocean and the South China Sea.— Zoologische Verhandelingen 87: 1-73.
- Liu, R., X. Liang & S. Yan. (1990). A study of the Palaemoninae (Crustacea Decapoda) from China I. Macrobrachium, Leander and Leandrites [in Chinese]. Transactions of the Chinese Crustacean Society. 2, 102-134
- Fransen, C. H. J. M. (1994). Marine palaemonoid shrimps of the Netherlands Seychelles Expedition 1992 1993. Zoologische Verhandelingen. 297: 85-152
- De Grave, S. & C.H.J.M. Fransen. (2011). Carideorum catalogus: the recent species of the dendrobranchiate, stenopodidean, procarididean and caridean shrimps (Crustacea: Decapoda). Zool. Med. Leiden. 85(9): 30.ix.2011: 195-589 figs 1-59
