= Cleaner shrimp =

Various crustaceans sharing a common name

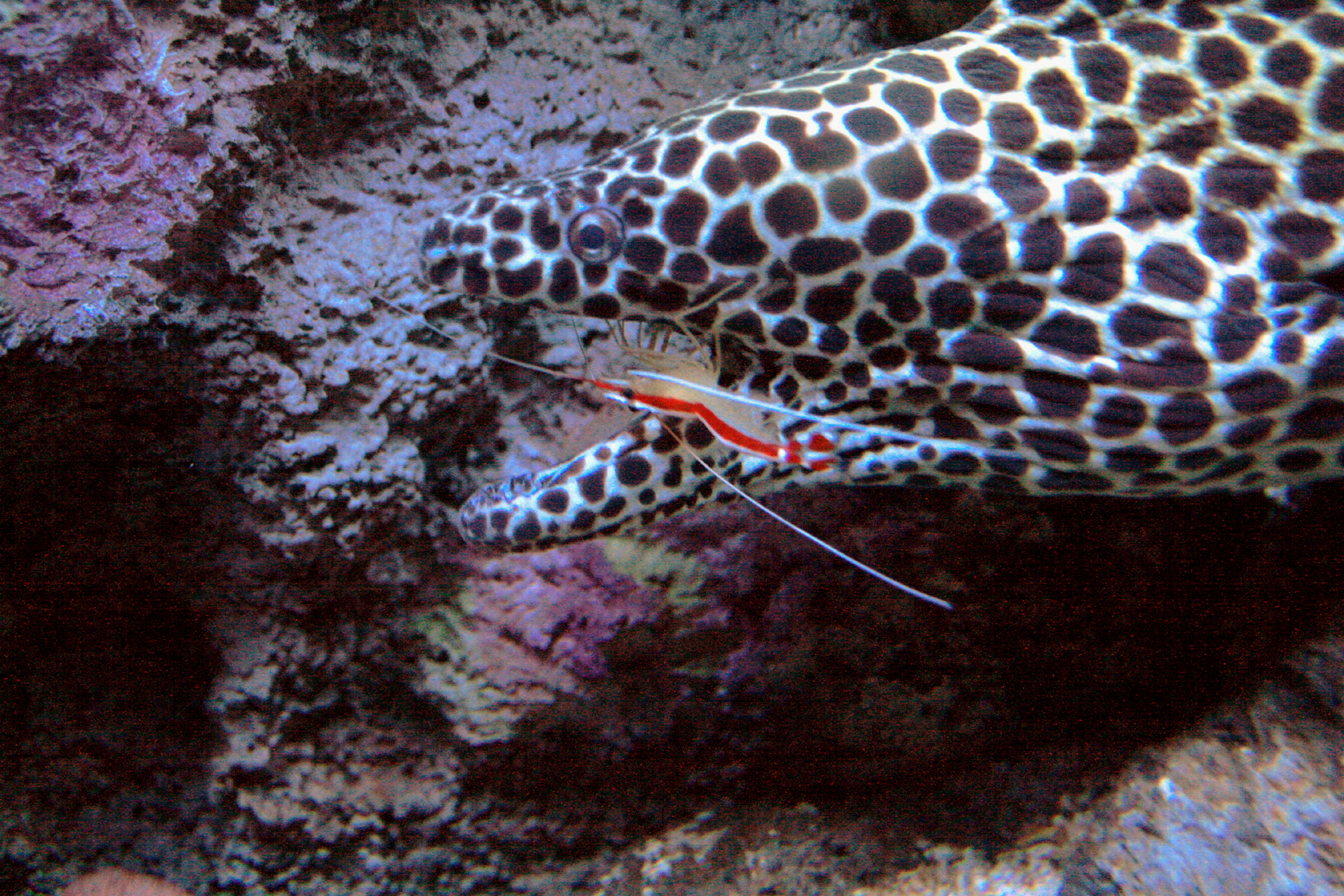
A Pacific cleaner shrimp, Lysmata amboinensis, cleans the mouth of a moray eel.

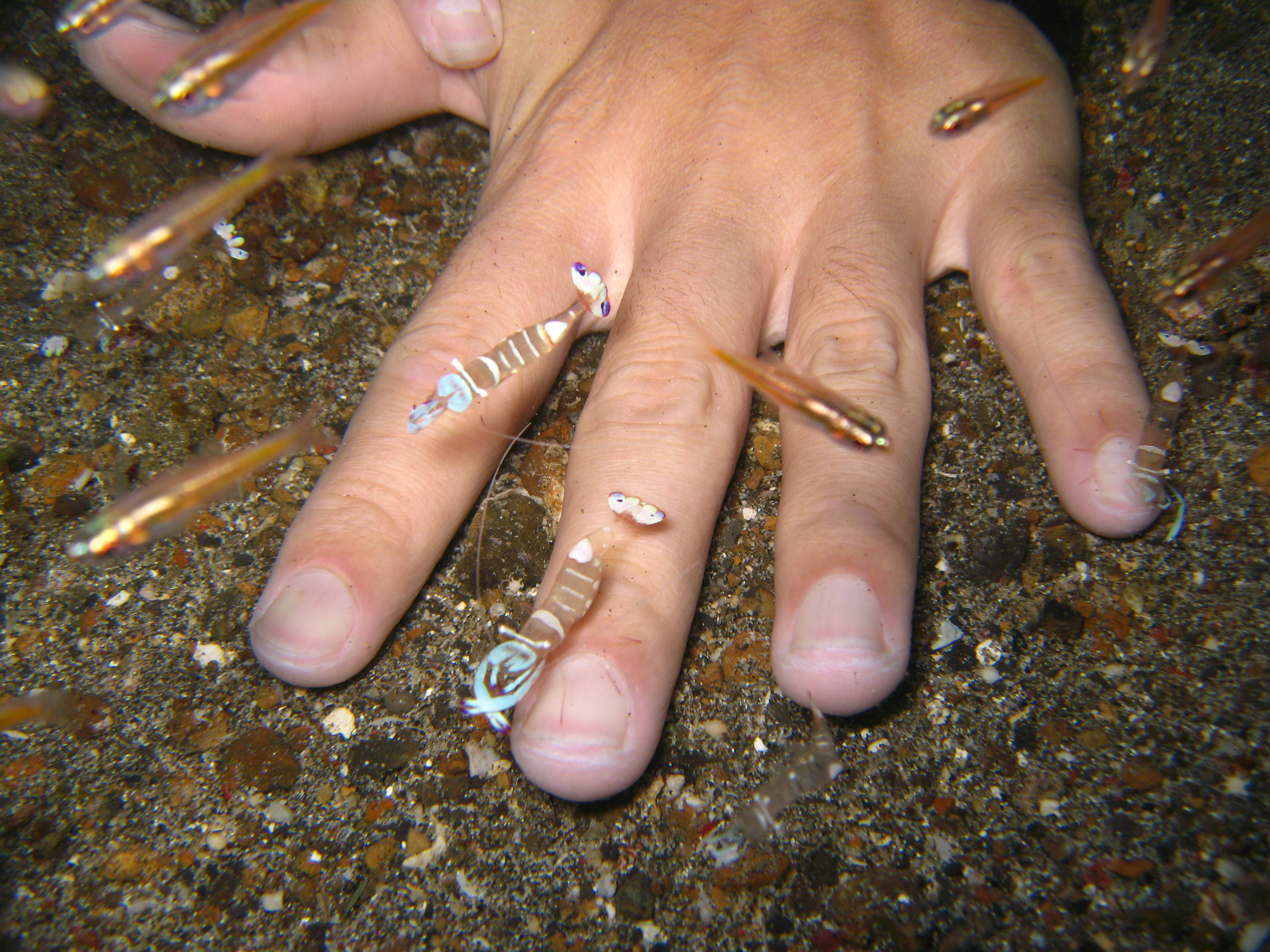
Three magnificent anemone shrimp (Ancylomenes magnificus) cleaning a diver's hand.

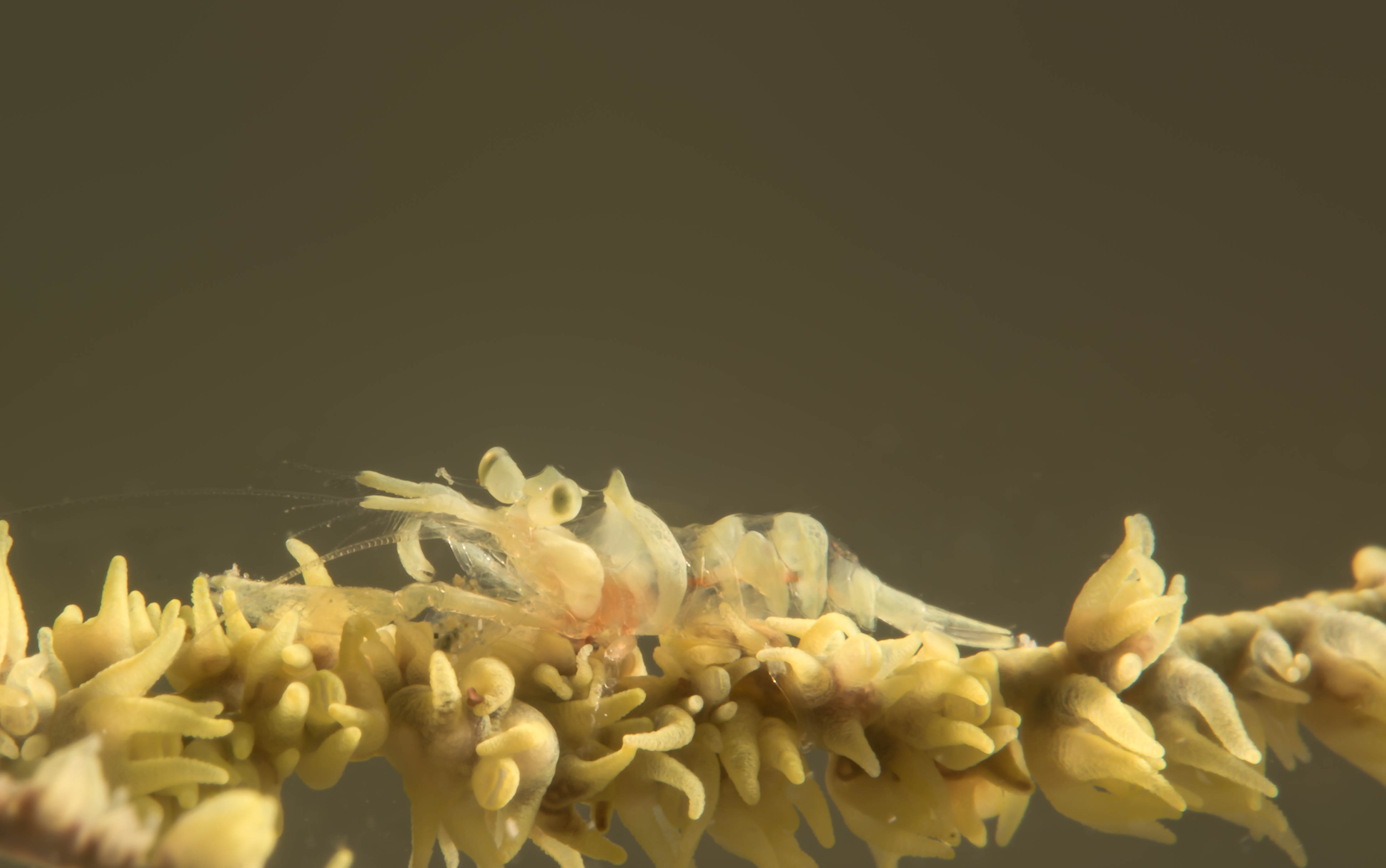
Wipe coral shrimp

Cleaner shrimp is a common name for a number of swimming decapod crustaceans that clean other organisms of parasites. Most are found in the families Hippolytidae (including the Pacific cleaner shrimp, Lysmata amboinensis) and Palaemonidae (including the spotted Periclimenes magnificus), though the families Alpheidae, Pandalidae, and Stenopodidae (including the banded coral shrimp, Stenopus hispidus) each contain at least one species of cleaner shrimp. The term "cleaner shrimp" is sometimes used more specifically for the family Hippolytidae and the genus Lysmata.

Cleaner shrimp are so called because they exhibit a cleaning symbiosis with client fish where the shrimp clean parasites from the fish. The fish benefit by having parasites removed from them, and the shrimp gain the nutritional value of the parasites. The shrimp also eat the mucus and parasites around the wounds of injured fish, which reduces infections and helps healing. The action of cleansing further aids the health of client fish by reducing their stress levels. In many coral reefs, cleaner shrimp congregate at cleaning stations. In this behaviour cleaner shrimps are similar to cleaner fish, and sometimes may join with cleaner wrasse and other cleaner fish attending to client fish.

Shrimp of the genus Urocaridella are often cryptic or live in caves on the reef and are not associated commensally with other animals. These shrimp assemble around cleaning stations where up to 25 shrimp live in proximity. When a potential client fish swims close to a station with shrimp present, several shrimp perform a "rocking dance," a side-to-side movement. Frequency of rocking increases with hunger. This increase in frequency suggests competition between hungry and sated shrimp. To avoid competition with other cleaners during the day, the shrimp Urocaridella antonbruunii was observed cleaning a sleeping fish at night.

Cleaner shrimps are often included in saltwater aquaria partly due to their cleansing function and partly due to their brightly colored appearance.
