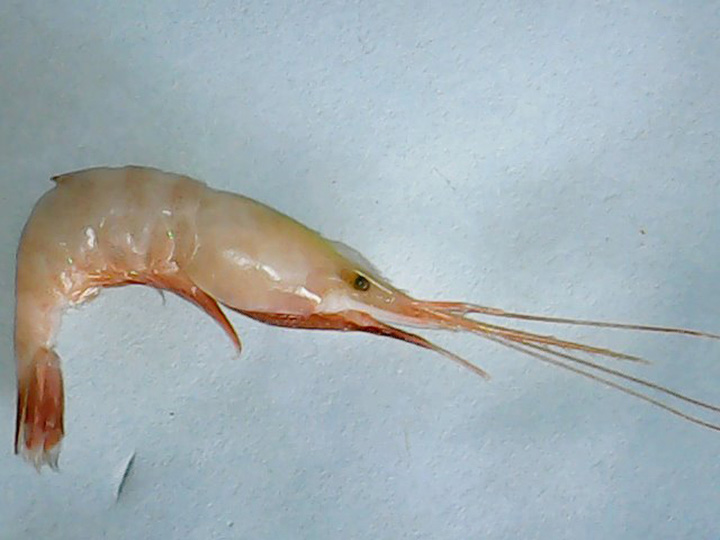
- Exhippolysmata oplophoroides

Scientific classification
- Kingdom: Animalia
- Phylum: Arthropoda
- Clade: Pancrustacea
- Class: Malacostraca
- Order: Decapoda
- Suborder: Pleocyemata
- Infraorder: Caridea
- Superfamily: Alpheoidea
- Family: Lysmatidae; Bruce, 1983

Synonyms
- Lysmatinae Dana, 1852

= Lysmatidae =

Family of crustaceans

Lysmatidae is a family of caridean shrimp in the order Decapoda.

== Genera ==
- Exhippolysmata Stebbing, 1915
- Ligur Sarato, 1885
- Lysmata Risso, 1816
- Lysmatella Borradaile, 1915
- Mimocaris Nobili, 1903
