= Androdioecy =

Presence of males and hermaphrodites in a population

Illustrates androdioecy: when a plant species has a mix of all-male (blue) and all-androgynous (purple) individuals.

Androdioecy is a reproductive system characterized by the coexistence of males and hermaphrodites. Androdioecy is rare in comparison with the other major reproductive systems: dioecy, gynodioecy and hermaphroditism. In animals, androdioecy has been considered a stepping stone in the transition from dioecy to hermaphroditism, and vice versa.

Androdioecy, trioecy and gynodioecy are sometimes referred to as a mixed mating systems. Androdioecy is a dimorphic sexual system in plants comparable with gynodioecy and dioecy.

== Evolution of androdioecy ==
The fitness requirements for androdioecy to arise and sustain itself are theoretically so improbable that it was long considered that such systems do not exist. Particularly, males and hermaphrodites have to have the same fitness, in other words produce the same number of offspring, in order to be maintained. However, males only have offspring by fertilizing eggs or ovules of hermaphrodites, while hermaphrodites have offspring both through fertilizing eggs or ovules of other hermaphrodites and their own ovules. This means that all else being equal, males have to fertilize twice as many eggs or ovules as hermaphrodites to make up for the lack of female reproduction.

Androdioecy can evolve either from hermaphroditic ancestors through the invasion of males or from dioecious ancestors through the invasion of hermaphrodites. The ancestral state is important because conditions under which androdioecy can evolve differ significantly.

=== Androdioecy with dioecious ancestry ===
In roundworms, clam shrimp, tadpole shrimp and cancrid shrimps, androdioecy has evolved from dioecy. In these systems, hermaphrodites can only fertilize their own eggs (self-fertilize) and do not mate with other hermaphrodites. Males are the only means of outcrossing. Hermaphrodites may be beneficial in colonizing new habitats, because a single hermaphrodite can generate many other individuals.

In the well-studied roundworm Caenorhabditis elegans, males are very rare and only occur in populations that are in bad condition or stressed. In Caenorhabditis elegans androdioecy is thought to have evolved from dioecy, through a trioecous intermediate.

=== Androdioecy with hermaphroditic ancestry ===
In barnacles, androdioecy evolved from hermaphroditism. Many plants self-fertilize, and males may be sustained in a population when inbreeding depression is severe because males guarantee outcrossing.

== Types of androdioecy ==
The most common form of androdioecy in animals involves hermaphrodites that can reproduce by autogamy or allogamy through ovum with males. However, this type does not involve outcrossing with sperm. This type of androdioecy generally occurs in predominantly gonochoric taxonomy groups.

One type of androdioecy contains outcrossing hermaphrodites which is present in some angiosperms.

Another type of androdioecy has males and simultaneous hermaphrodites in a population due to developmental or conditional sex allocation. Like in some fish species small individuals are hermaphrodites and under circumstances of high density, large individuals become male.

== Androdioecious species ==
Despite their unlikely evolution, 115 androdioecious animal and about 50 androdioecious plant species are known. These species include

=== Anthozoa (Corals) ===
- Goniastra australensis
- Stylophora pistillata

=== Nematoda (Roundworms) ===
Rhabditidae (Order Rhabditida)

- Caenorhabditis briggsae
- Caenorhabditis elegans
- Caenorhabditis sp. 11
- Oscheius myriophila
- Oscheius dolchura
- Oscheius tipulae
- Oscheius guentheri
- Rhabditis rainai
- Rhabditis sp. (AF5)
- Rhabdias nigrovenosum
- Rhabdias rubrovenosa
- Rhabdias ranae
- Entomelas entomelas

Diplogastridae (Order Rhabditida)

- Allodiplogaster sudhausi
- Diplogasteroides magnus
- Levipalatum texanum
- Pristionchus boliviae
- Pristionchus fissidentatus
- Pristionchus maupasi
- Pristionchus mayeri
- Pristionchus pacificus
- Pristionchus triformis
- Sudhausia aristotokia
- Sudhausia crassa

Steinernematidae (Order Rhabditida)

- Steinernema hermaphroditum

Allanotnematidae (Order Rhabditida)

- Allantonema mirabile
- Bradynema rigidum

Dorylaimida

- Dorylaimus liratus

=== Nemertea (Ribbon worms) ===
- Prostoma eilhardi

=== Arthropoda ===
Clam shrimp

- Eulimnadia texana
- Eulimnadia africana
- Eulimnadia agassizii
- Eulimnadia antlei
- Eulimnadia braueriana
- Eulimnadia brasiliensis
- Eulimnadia colombiensis
- Eulimnadia cylondrova
- Eulimnadia dahli
- Eulimnadia diversa
- Eulimnadia feriensis
- Eulimnadia follisimilis
- Eulimnadia thompsoni
- Eulimnadia sp. A
- Eulimnadia sp. B
- Eulimnadia sp. C

Tadpole shrimp

- Triops cancriformis
- Triops newberryi
- Triops longicaudatus

Barnacles

- Paralepas klepalae
- Paralepas xenophorae
- Koleolepas avis
- Koleolepas tinkeri
- Ibla quadrivalvis
- Ibla cumingii
- Ibla idiotica
- Ibla segmentata
- Calantica studeri
- Calantica siemensi
- Calantica spinosa
- Calantica villosa
- Arcoscalpellum sp.
- Euscalpellum squamuliferum
- Scalpellum peronii
- Scalpellum scalpellum
- Scalpellum vulgare
- Scillaelepas arnaudi
- Scillaelepas bocquetae
- Scillaelepas calyculacilla
- Scillaelepas falcate
- Scillaelepas fosteri
- Smilium hastatum
- Smilium peronii
- Chelonibia patula
- Chelonibia testudinaria
- Bathylasma alearum
- Bathylasma corolliforme
- Conopea galeata
- Conopea calceola
- Conopea merrilli
- Solidobalanus masignotus
- Tetrapachylasma trigonum
- Megalasma striatum
- Octolasmis warwickii

Lysmata

- Lysmata wurdemanni
- Lysmata amboinensis
- Lysmata californica
- Lysmata bahia
- Lysmata intermedia
- Lysmata grabhami
- Lysmata seticaudata
- Lysmata nilita
- Lysmata hochi
- Lysmata nayaritensis
- Lysmata rafa
- Lysmata boggessi
- Lysmata ankeri
- Lysmata pederseni
- Lysmata debelius
- Lysmata galapaguensis
- Lysmata cf. trisetacea

Insects

- Icerya bimaculata
- Icerya purchasi
- Crypticerya zeteki

=== Annelida (Ringed worms) ===
- Salvatoria clavata
- Ophryotrocha gracilis
- Ophryotrocha hartmanni
- Ophryotrocha diadema
- Ophryotrocha bacci
- Ophryotrocha maculata
- Ophryotrocha socialis

=== Chordata ===
- Kryptolebias marmoratus
- Serranus fasciatus
- Serranus baldwini

=== Angiosperms (Flowering plants) ===
- Some Acer (maple) species
- Castilla elastica
- Culcita macrocarpa
- Datisca cannabina (false hemp)
- Datisca glomerata (Durango root)
- Fraxinus lanuginosa (Japanese ash)
- Fraxinus ornus
- Fuchsia microphylla
- Gagea serotina
- Magnolia lotungensis
- Mercurialis annua (Annual mercury)
- Neobuxbaumia mezcalaensis
- Nephelium lappaceum (Rambutan)
- Panax trifolius (Ginseng)
- Oxalis suksdorfii
- Phillyrea angustifolia
- Phillyrea latifolia
- Ricinocarpos pinifolius
- Sagittaria lancifolia (sub-androdioecy)
- Saxifraga cernua
- Schizopepon bryoniaefolius
- Spinifex littoreus
- Ulmus minor

== See also ==
- Gynodioecy
- Plant sexuality
- Dioecy
- Trioecy
- Hermaphrodite
- Monoicy
