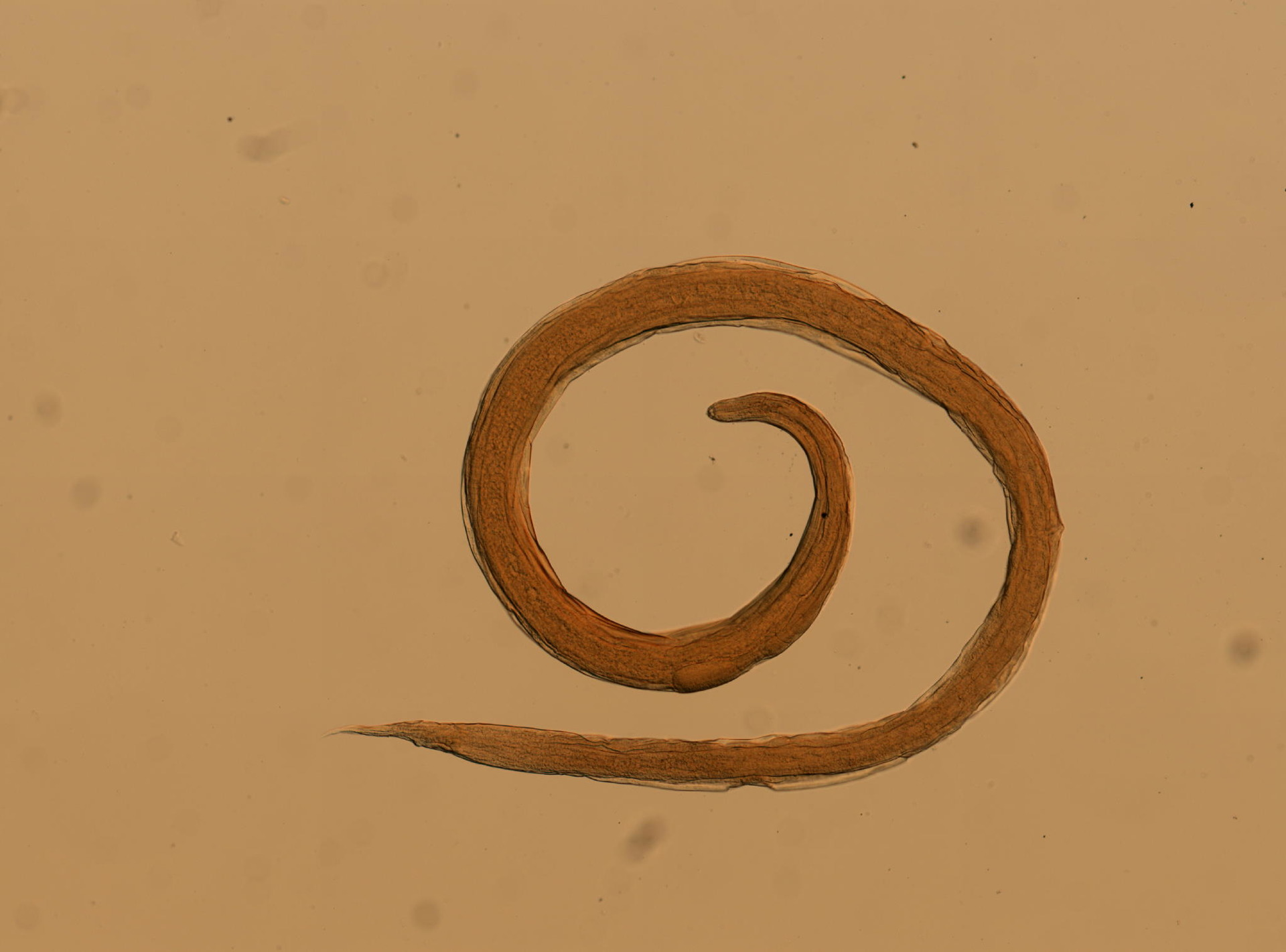

Scientific classification
- Domain: Eukaryota
- Kingdom: Animalia
- Phylum: Nematoda
- Class: Chromadorea
- Order: Rhabditida
- Family: Rhabdiasidae
- Genus: Rhabdias
- Species: R. ranae

Binomial name
- Rhabdias ranae Walton, 1929

= Rhabdias ranae =

Species of roundworm

Rhabdias ranae is a species of nematode. The species has been described as androdioecious.
