= Peppermint shrimp =

Set index article for the common name "peppermint shrimp"

Peppermint shrimp is a common name used in the marine aquarium trade to describe several species of visually similar shrimp in the genus Lysmata. These shrimp are popular for their scavenging and cleaning behaviour, and some are used in pest control — especially for managing outbreaks of Aiptasia anemones in reef aquaria. However, the name does not refer to a single species and has been widely misapplied within the aquarium hobby and trade.

The following species are most commonly referred to as peppermint shrimp:

- Lysmata boggessi – Considered the "true peppermint shrimp" in the aquarium trade. Native to the Gulf of Mexico and western Atlantic, it is the only species in this group consistently documented to consume Aiptasia anemones in both scientific studies and aquarium observations.
- Lysmata wurdemanni – Historically referred to as the peppermint shrimp, but now known to comprise a complex of cryptic species. Many individuals formerly sold under this name were actually misidentified members of other species. It is not reliably associated with Aiptasia control in reef systems.
- Lysmata rathbunae – Occasionally misidentified as a peppermint shrimp, particularly in mixed shipments. It is not known to consume Aiptasia and is not typically used for pest control.
- Lysmata ankeri and Lysmata bahia – Less common in the trade but visually similar to other peppermint shrimp. Their predatory behaviour toward Aiptasia is inconsistent or undocumented.

== See also ==
- Lysmata – genus to which all peppermint shrimp belong
- Aiptasia – pest anemone commonly found in reef aquariums
