= Rhabdias pseudosphaerocephala =

Scientific classification
- Kingdom: Animalia
- Phylum: Nematoda
- Class: Chromadorea
- Order: Rhabditida
- Family: Rhabdiasidae
- Genus: Rhabdias
- Species: R. pseudosphaerocephala

Binomial name
- Rhabdias pseudosphaerocephala Kuzmin, Tkach & Brooks, 2007

Species of roundworm

Rhabdias pseudosphaerocephala is a species of parasitic nematodes in the family Rhabdiasidae. It was first found in lungs of the cane toad Bufo marinus in Costa Rica and Nicaragua. It can be confused with Rhabdias sphaerocephala, described from toads in Europe, yet differs from the latter by its head-end morphology and in sequences of rDNA.
