= Teufelshöhle (near Steinau) =

Stalactite cave in Hesse, Germany

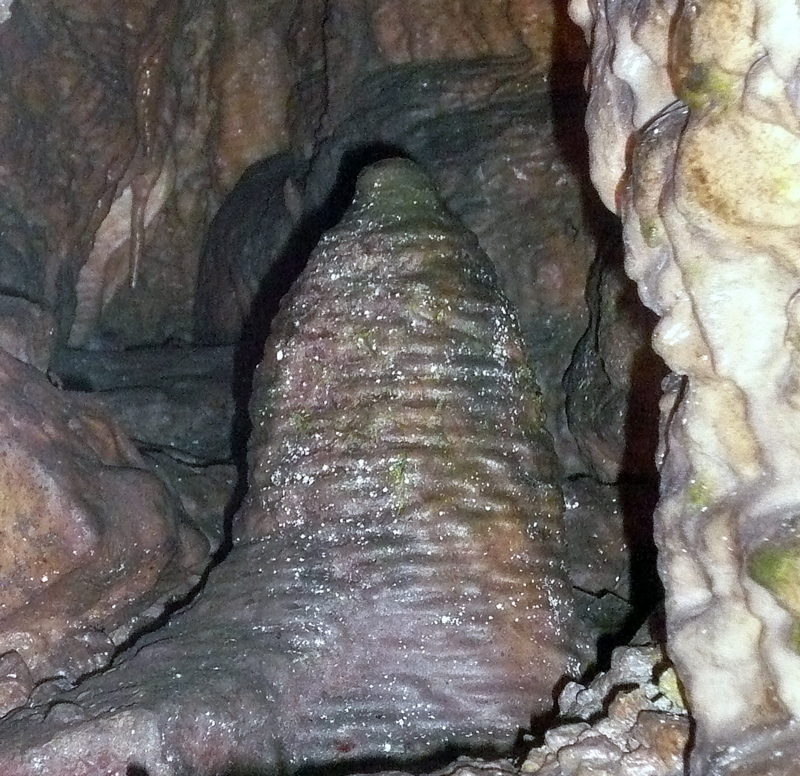
- Beehive

- Location within Hesse
- Location: Hesse, Germany
- Coordinates: 50°20′17.2″N 9°27′18″E
- Elevation: 272.6 m (894 ft) above sea level NN
- Discovery: 1584
- Geology: Shell limestone
- Show cave opened: since 1927
- Show cave length: 47 m (154 ft); 174 m (571 ft) with access tunnels
- Lighting: electric (since 1927)
- Visitors: 16,000 per year
- Website: https://www.steinau.eu/index_main.php?unid=2401

The Teufelshöhle (lit. 'Devil's Cave') is a dripstone cave situated in the Main-Kinzig district in Hesse, Germany. It is located approximately three kilometres (1.9 mi) north of Steinau an der Straße, nestled between the Spessart Mountains to the south and the Vogelsberg Mountains to the north, on the slope of the Kieskopf. This natural geological monument is approximately 2.5 million years old. The cave was discovered in 1584. For a considerable period, local inhabitants avoided venturing into the cave due to a prevailing belief that the devil inhabited it. The first brief exploration of the cave took place in 1830. Subsequently, from 1905 to 1908, an access tunnel was excavated, leading to the development of the cave. In 1927, it was officially opened as an electrically illuminated show cave, spanning a length of 174 m (571 ft) and comprising three substantial chambers, one of which contains dripstones.

== History ==
=== Discovery ===
The cave's discovery in the autumn of 1584 is attributed to a cowherd named Jox Mellmann. The incident unfolded when one of the cows from Mellmann's herd strayed and fell through a thin layer of earth into a cavity. After an extensive search, Mellmann noticed a dark shaft where the cow had disappeared. He firmly believed that this occurrence could only be attributed to the devil, who he thought had consumed the cow. The local population, steeped in superstition, shared this belief. Consequently, the cavity acquired the name Teufelsloch (Devil's Hole). In order to drive away the devil, the inhabitants threw stones into it. The peasants had to bring basalt boulders to the hole for several months, and even deceased animals were cast into the hole. Since the Wohnung des Teufels (devil's dwelling) could not be filled, it led the population to conclude that the devil was too powerful to be defeated in this manner. Such fear of the devil became so pronounced that farmers hesitated to venture into the meadow. The hole served for a time as a dog cemetery for the Count of Hanau, who resided in Steinau Castle.

=== Development ===
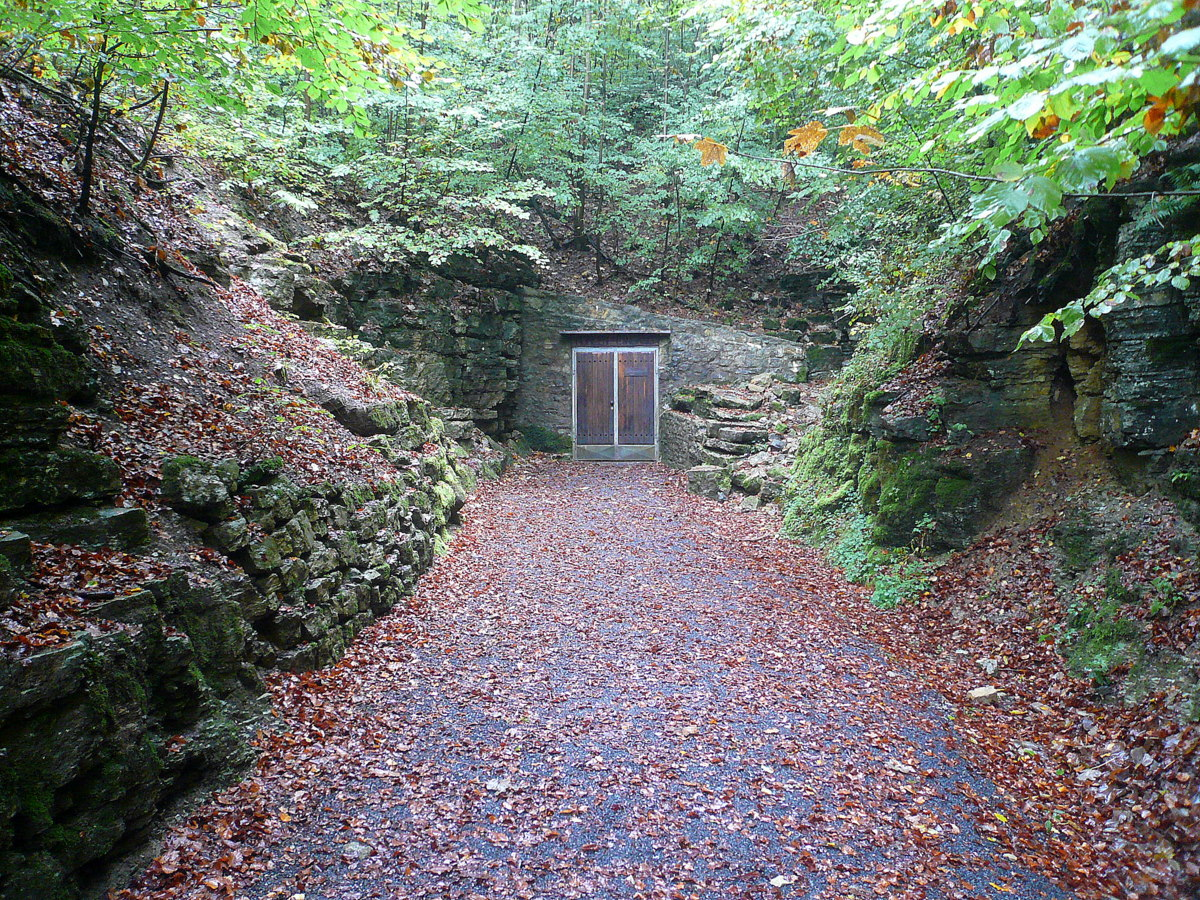
Cave access

In 1830, Walter, a journeyman papermaker from Steinau, became the first person to descend into the cave using abseiling techniques. However, when bats began to fly around his head and water dripped onto him, fear prompted him to be pulled out of the cave. Another expedition to the cave occurred in 1898. On June 14, according to other traditions in July, three men participated. This group included road builder Lüders, who organized the expedition, road keeper Methfessel, and master roofer Scheer. They came equipped with ladders, ropes, crampons, and hooks, while torches provided the necessary illumination. Their exploration led them to a cone of rubble within the Great Dome of the cave. After this exploration, it was decided to make the cave accessible to the public. For this purpose, an almost horizontal tunnel was to be dug from the outside to the Great Dome. In 1905, when the required funding became available, excavations began.

Over three years, three Polish miners undertook the task of excavating into the mountain using a hammer and chisel as their tools and oriented themselves with a compass. The excavated material was transported out using hoists mounted on rails. After covering 45 m (148 ft), they made a remarkable discovery: an unknown natural cavity adorned with dripstones, which they named the chapel. They reached the Great Dome after excavating 54 m (177 ft). However, the Great Dome was initially filled with rubble and bones, making it impassable. To create a passage, a substantial amount of material, totalling 300 cubic metres (11,000 cu ft), including basalt, clay soil, tree trunks, and animal bones, had to be transported out. This extensive effort resulted in the formation of a platform at the same level as the entrance gallery. During the excavation process, numerous animal bones from dogs, goats, cattle, donkeys, cats, and pigs were discovered, which underwent thorough examination and dating by Fritz Drevermann, a professor of geology and paleontology who also served as the rector of the Johann Wolfgang Goethe University in Frankfurt am Main, Germany.

In 1911, during the excavation of the rubble cone in the cave, a skull purportedly belonging to a fossil human was reported to have been discovered. This discovery was documented on 24 June 1911 in an article published by the Schlüchterner Zeitung as a supplement titled "Der Schädelfund im 'Teufelsloch' bei Steinau" (The skull found in the 'Devil's Hole' near Steinau). A Swedish scientist expressed interest in the rare skull, offering 3000 Reichsmark for its acquisition. There were many theories about the origin of the skull. Experts' opinions varied between a juvenile Neanderthal, a pygmy, or even an ape. Professor Otto zur Strassen remarked that the skull was far too well preserved for a fossil, and suspected that it was a chimpanzee skull. Upon further examination, he discovered two holes with traces of rust from nails that had been used to secure the lower jaw. It was revealed that a pharmacist from Steinau had acquired a monkey skull through his brother living in Africa. The pharmacist had chemically treated the skull to make it appear several thousand years old and then concealed it within the cave's rubble during the excavations, intending to play a trick on the head of the excavations, road construction foreman Lüders.

On 11 November 1913 the Association for the Development of the Dripstone Cave was established. Subsequently, on 10 March 1924, the cave and its adjacent surroundings were officially designated as a nature reserve under the supervision of Hans Karl Becker, a chemist, geologist, and chairman of the Verein für Höhlenkunde in Frankfurt am Main e. V.

=== Show cave ===
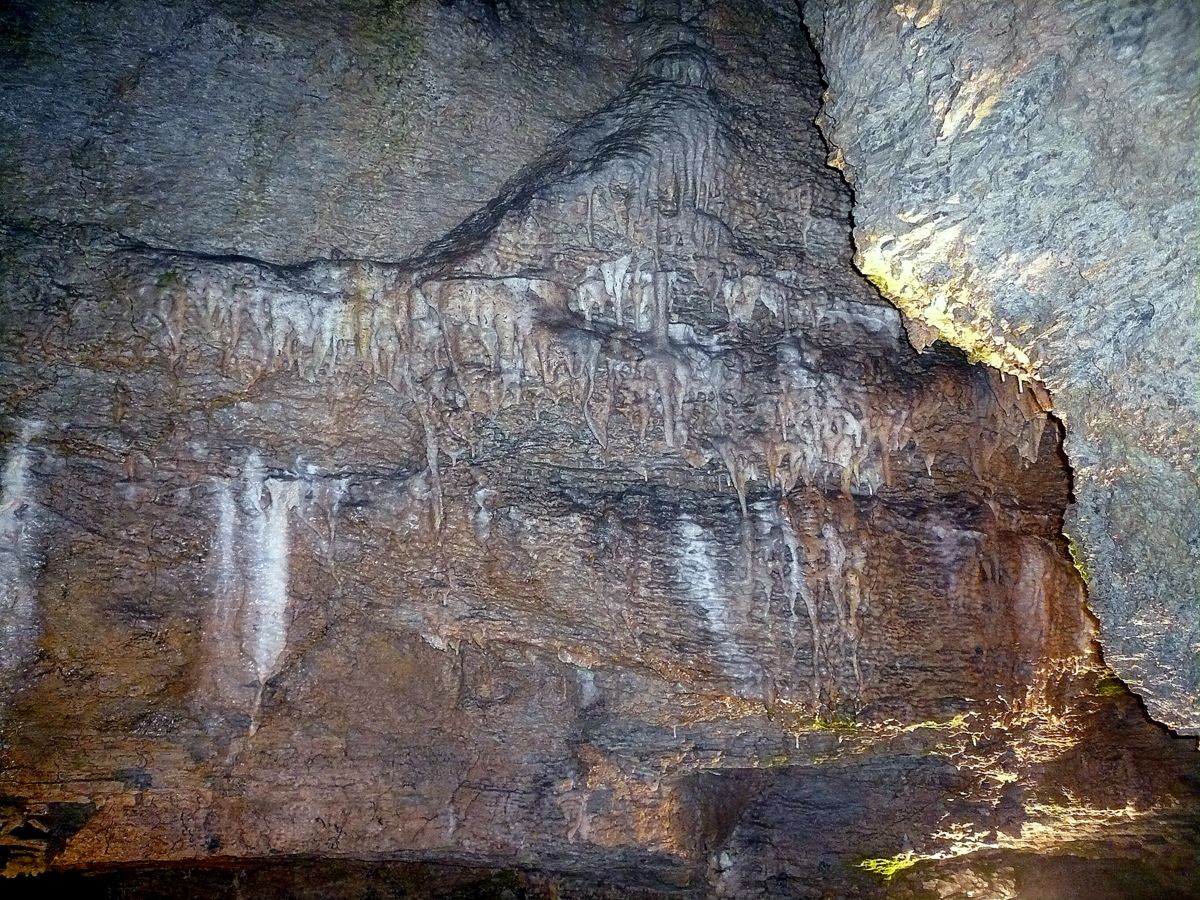
Sintered wall, with broken stalactites

In 1927, the cave saw the installation of its first electric light system, marking the official opening of the cave to the public. During World War II, it temporarily served as an air raid shelter for the residents of Steinau. Following the war, the cave fell within the American occupation zone. Unfortunately, in the chapel area, several stalactites, some exceeding a metre (3 ft) in length and growing side by side, were broken off by American forces, while one larger stalactite, approximately one metre (3 ft) in length and situated at a higher location, remained intact. In 1952, the cave was once again made accessible to visitors. However, in the 1970s, a worker for a contractor broke off and stole a stalactite during security work. In 1976, geological and geophysical surveys were conducted within the cave and its surrounding area using the sonar method. This technique enables continuous horizontal measurements over significant distances.

In 1978, cavities near the Devil's Cave were discovered through drilling and subsequently photographed using probe cameras. However, these cavities were not made accessible to the public. On 23 August 1983 the cave and its surrounding area were once again designated as a nature reserve. This designation is listed with the Hessian Ministry for the Environment, Climate Protection, Agriculture, and Consumer Protection, encompassing an area of 15 hectares (37 acres), under the name Teufelsloch bei Steinau an der Straß with the number 435-012. In 1998, the development of another cavity began, and it was subsequently included in guided tours. Over the years, there have been considerations to modernize the exterior of the cave and install a toilet facility. However, these plans have faced challenges due to nature conservation requirements. In July 2010, the hut located in front of the cave was destroyed by fire, with arson not entirely ruled out as a cause. In autumn 2011, efforts were made to construct a new hut with facilities for cave visitors, including a toilet suitable for the disabled. However, as of the summer of 2012, a temporary structure still stood in its place. In the same year, a new lighting system utilizing light-emitting diodes (LEDs) was installed. This project had been planned since 2009 and aimed to reduce the impact on the cave's ecosystem. Additionally, a public address system was introduced in the dome.

== Geology ==
=== Origin ===
The Teufelshöhle is situated within the lower Muschelkalk, an approximately 230- to 250-million-year-old geological layer within a karst landscape. This cave, which came into existence about 2.5 million years ago, is a rare geological feature in the Spessart region, with red sandstone and basalt predominating. Within Hesse, the Teufelshöhle is one of only three show caves. It stands as one of the two dripstone caves, the other being the Herbstlabyrinth, which opened in 2009. The formation of the Teufelshöhle involved the influx of lime-saturated waters, including contributions from the Ulmbach stream, which entered through fine cracks and fissures within the hanging basaltic rocks. The dissolution of limestone by carbonic acid played a pivotal role in the creation of dripstones. Additionally, the presence of underground watercourses with whirlpools contributed to the formation of cavities, such as the Great Dome. The existence of both water-permeable and impermeable rock layers in the ground was crucial to the development of the cave.

=== Development ===
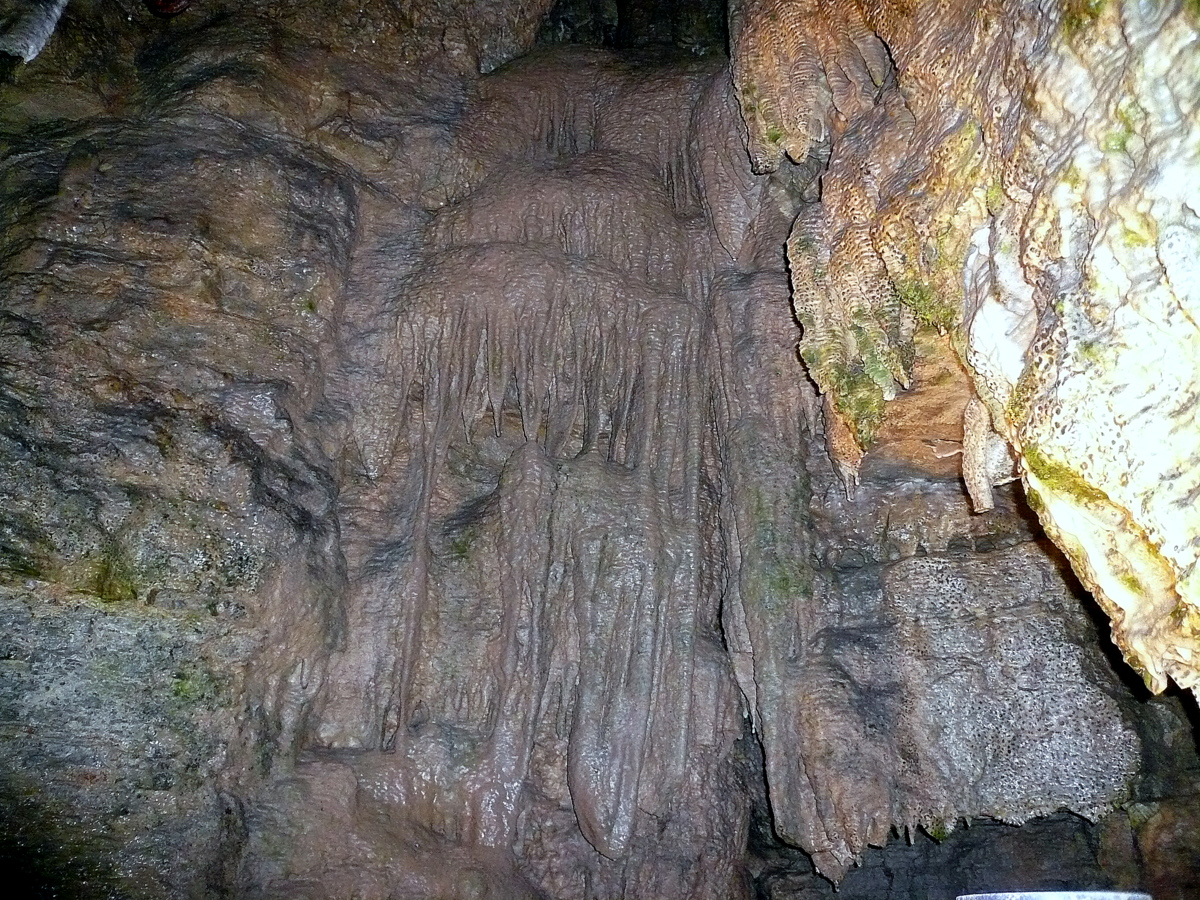
Waterfall in the chapel

The temperature within the cave maintains a constant range of around eight to nine degrees Celsius, and the humidity consistently exceeds 80 percent. Access to the cave system is provided through a 54-meter-long gallery, which was artificially created and serves as both the entrance and exit. This gallery is situated at an elevation of 272.6 meters above sea level. The cave itself comprises three spacious chambers interconnected by partially narrow passages. The front part of the tunnel is lined with corrugated metal. At its terminus lies the Great Dome, first discovered in 1584, which is the largest chamber within the cave. This chamber reaches a height of 16 meters and boasts an almost circular floor plan with a diameter of approximately eleven meters. An opening in the ceiling connects it to the outside world through a shaft, the former Devil's Hole, allowing partial sunlight to penetrate the cave. Originally, the room's height was 25 meters, but the lower nine meters consisted of inserted material. The distinctive curvature of the cave was formed due to the whirlpool effect created by the convergence of two water veins, whose remnants are still visible. The continuous action of water gradually expanded the cave. The cave's ceiling eventually became so thin that a grazing cow is said to have broken through it about 400 years ago. Stalactites are notably absent in the Great Dome due to the availability of fresh air. The chamber's walls feature bright, shiny lime sinter coatings, and the horizontal layers of different rock levels are visible.

From the Great Dome, visitors proceed into the climatic chamber. To access this area, a staircase has been built on the floor of the dome, which has been filled with debris. Above this staircase is a wooden platform that aligns with the rest of the dome's floor area. The climatic chamber represents the lowest point within the cave, situated 34 meters beneath the Earth's surface. This passage-like room offers air that is nearly devoid of dust, with humidity levels at an impressive 98 percent, higher than in other parts of the cave. It also contains the highest concentration of water within the cave system, and the air is notably carbonated. A bench facilitates individuals with specific medical conditions, including whooping cough, asthma, bronchial diseases, and, according to recent findings, neurodermatitis, as part of their treatment. An upward staircase followed by a narrow passage leads to the bat chamber, which is a higher cavity where bats hibernate. The ceiling of this room is relatively thin, allowing some roots to grow through it from above. These roots were last removed in 2009. The path then leads back to the Great Dome, completing the circuit within the cave.

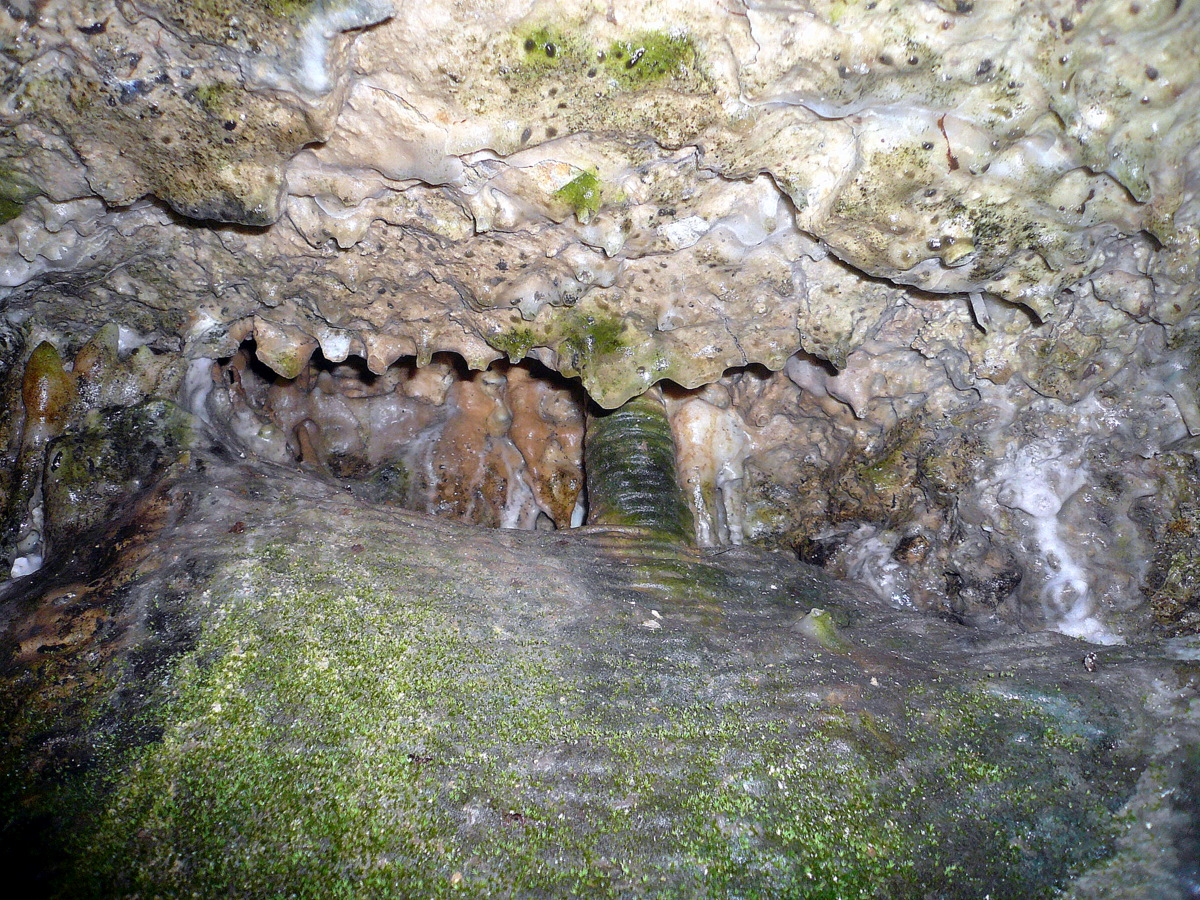
Devil's throat

Continuing from the Great Dome, a short corridor on the left side of the entrance gallery leads to the chapel, which is considered the most beautiful room in the cave and extensively adorned with sinter deposits. Several stalactites up to one meter long were stolen by Americans after World War II, and another in the 1970s. The chapel boasts a diameter of approximately 5.5 meters and a height of about eight meters. Within the chapel, various stalactite formations have received names based on their appearance. For instance, on one wall, there is the "waterfall," estimated to be around 85,000 years old, which extends to a total height of 2.75 meters. Near the entrance of the chapel is the devil's head, while on another wall, in a small niche, one can find the devil's throat, a stalactite column referred to as Stalagnat, and in front of it, his tooth or that of his grandmother. A short staircase with a turnaround point ascends within the chapel, leading to a small passage that cannot be entered. Within this crevice lies a stalagmite resembling a woven beehive, with a diameter of about 15 centimeters and a height of approximately 30 centimeters. Its age is estimated to be about 65,000 years. Additional stalactite formations within the chapel include the devil's claw, also known as an elephant, and the devil's head with a goatee. The oldest dripstones in the cave are estimated to be up to 255,000 years old.

== Flora and fauna ==
=== Wildlife ===
The cave is inhabited by five distinct species of bats, making them some of the most highly developed residents of the cave. These species include the mouse-eared bat (Myotis myotis), bearded bat (Myotis brandtii), long-eared bat (Plecotus), fringed bat (Myotis nattereri), and water bat (Myotis daubentonii). These bats enter the cave in the autumn through the Teufelsloch (Devil's Hole) in the Great Dome to hibernate undisturbed. Consequently, the cave is closed to visitors and cave operators from November 1 until Easter, primarily for nature conservation reasons. There have been attempts by conservationists to remove the cave's status as a show cave and to keep it closed year-round to protect the bats, but these efforts have not succeeded. During the winter, most of the bats congregate in what is referred to as the "bat hotel," where approximately 800 animals huddle closely together on the ceiling. Within the entrance gallery of the cave, several species of spiders from the Nesticidae family can be found on the ceiling. Additionally, the cave is home to fire salamanders (Salamandra salamandra) and various amphibians. Among the smallest creatures in the cave are several species of crustaceans (Crustacea) and mollusks (Bivalvia).

=== Lamp flora ===
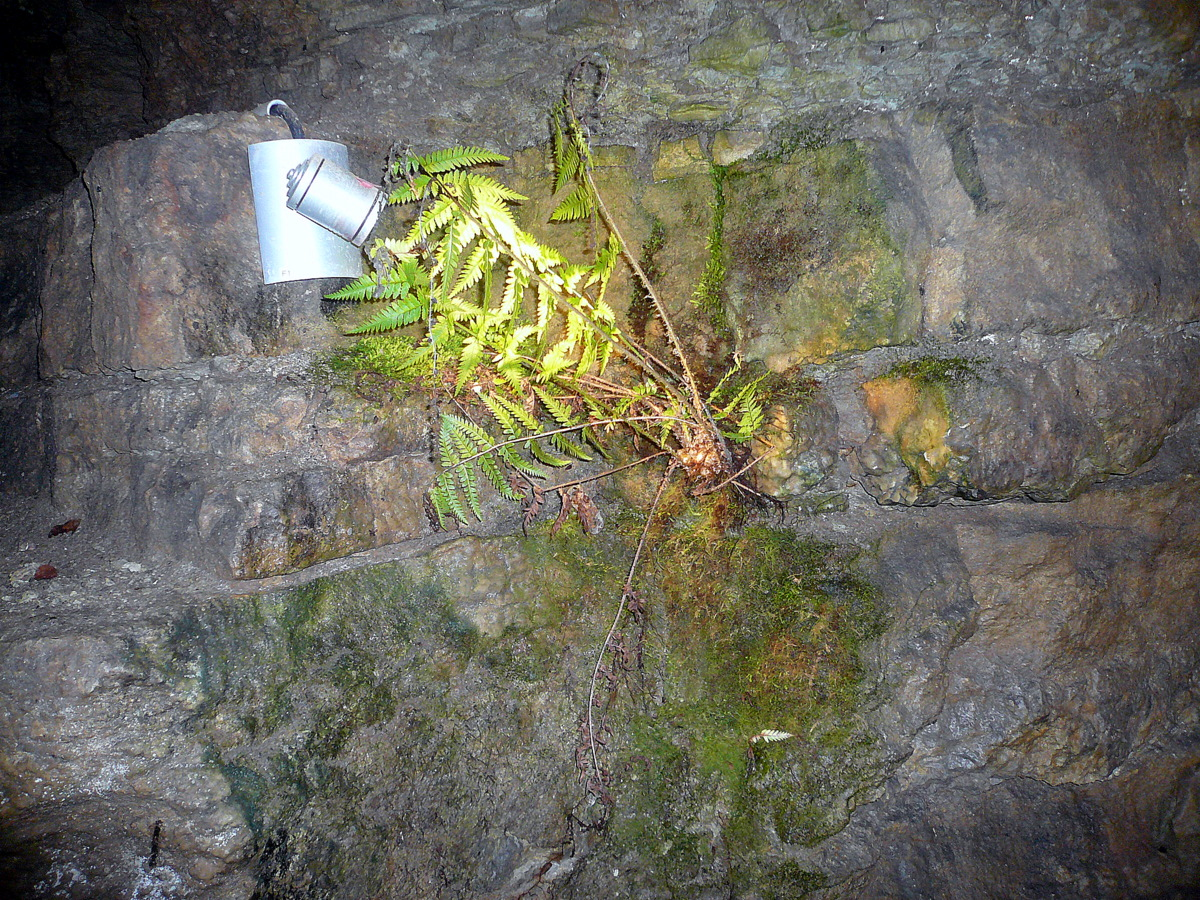
Lamp flora

Within the Teufelshöhle, a unique plant community referred to as "lamp flora" has developed in the presence of artificial lighting. This flora primarily consists of algae, mosses, fungi, and fern plants that can establish themselves in the vicinity of the light sources. These plants typically exhibit stunted growth forms that would struggle to survive in complete darkness without the aid of artificial lighting. The plants are unevenly distributed and depend on the spores that enter the cave through water seepage from the Earth's surface via cracks and fissures. Additionally, cave visitors inadvertently contribute to the dispersal of these plants. In certain areas of the cave, due to drought, little or no lamp flora could develop. However, in the Great Dome, the largest chamber in the cave and the only one connected to the outside world, distinctive plant growth has occurred due to drafts. Notably, the dwarf fern in this area grows at a rate of one to five millimeters per year.

== Tourism ==
Guided tours are available daily from the beginning of July to the end of September. Additionally, from April 20, tours are offered from Friday to Sunday. Special tours may also be arranged. These tours take visitors through various sections of the cave via easily accessible paths and stairs, with a duration of approximately 30 minutes. The route includes ascending some stairs to reach the climatic chamber and then returning to visit the chapel and the beehive formation. The total walk covers about 174 meters, with double access to part of the cave and the access tunnel. Within the cave, natural cavities with a combined length of 47 meters are accessible. The cave is wheelchair-accessible for 150 meters. To reach the cave, visitors can take the road from Steinau to Grebenhain. From the parking lot along the road, it's approximately a ten-minute walk to the cave entrance. Individuals with mobility challenges have the option to drive to the cave via a gravel path. There is no public transport connection. The cave also hosts events for children, such as Halloween. However, the number of visitors to the cave has declined in recent years, as is the case with many show caves. While there were approximately 25,000 visitors per year around the year 2000, the number of visitors has stabilized at around 16,000 visitors per year more recently. This makes the Devil's Cave one of the less-visited show caves in Germany.
