= Rhabdias bufonis =

Scientific classification
- Kingdom: Animalia
- Phylum: Nematoda
- Class: Chromadorea
- Order: Rhabditida
- Family: Rhabdiasidae
- Genus: Rhabdias
- Species: R. bufonis

Binomial name
- Rhabdias bufonis (Schrank, 1788) Stiles et Hassall, 1905

Species of roundworm

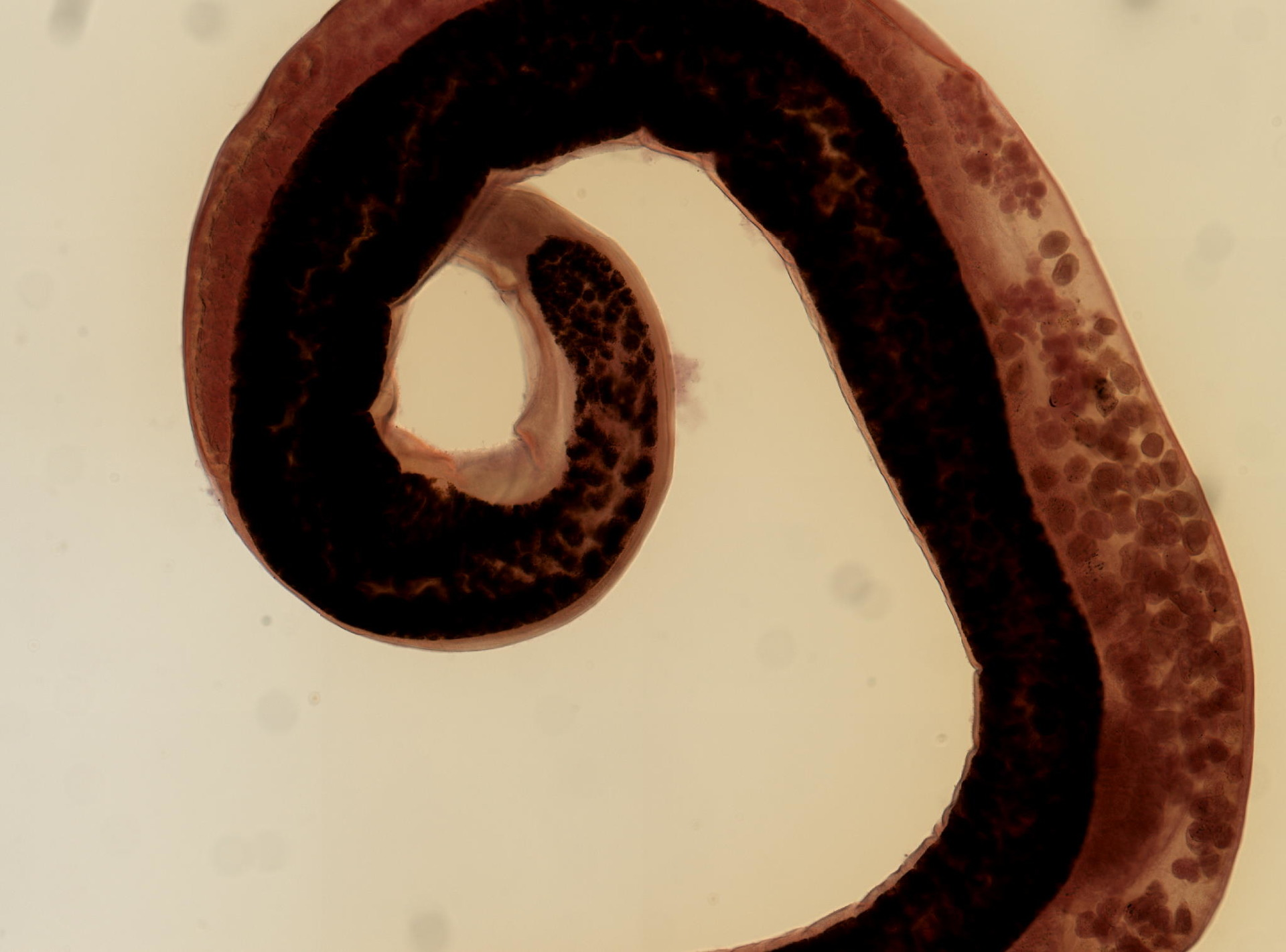
Rhabdias bufonis, preserved specimen

Rhabdias bufonis is a species of parasitic nematode in the family Rhabdiasidae. It was first described from the lungs of the European common toad (Bufo bufo) but has also been found in a number of other species of frog.

== Life cycle ==
Rhabdias bufonis has a heterogonic lifestyle in which a generation of parasitic individuals is succeeded by a free-living generation. This is advantageous to the parasite as it allows reproduction for one or more generations in the absence of the host. The free-living male and female worms mate and produce eggs which hatch inside the mother. They feed on her internal organs and moult twice before they leave her body. They are now infective larvae and can penetrate the skin of a frog. Once inside, they can migrate to the lungs and further develop there, feeding on the lung tissue. The adult parasitic worm is a hermaphrodite and grows to be about ten times the length of the free-living form. The eggs it produces are coughed into the frog's mouth, are swallowed and develop in its intestine. They are passed in the feces and develop into free-living forms. In the soil, the worms feed on bacteria and other organic matter. The female may produce a pheromone to attract a male.

== Parasitism ==
Rhabdias bufonis is found in the parts of Europe and Asia in which its host frogs are found. Besides the common toad from which this roundworm was first described, it has been found in the common spadefoot toad (Pelobates fuscus), the common frog (Rana temporaria), the moor frog (Rana arvalis), the agile frog (Rana dalmatina), the European fire-bellied toad (Bombina bombina), the yellow-bellied toad (Bombina variegata), water frogs (Pelophylax spp.) and the European green toad (Bufo viridis).

Juvenile frogs are often infected and a heavy worm burden can seriously restrict their growth. In a study, some of the infected juveniles were only half as heavy as controls with no worms. The parasite-induced anorexia caused a decrease in food intake and some of the young host frogs died.
