= Neoibla =

Scientific classification
- Kingdom: Animalia
- Phylum: Arthropoda
- Class: Thecostraca
- Subclass: Cirripedia
- Order: Iblomorpha
- Family: Iblidae
- Subfamily: Neoiblinae; Buckeridge & Newman, 2006
- Genus: Neoibla; Buckeridge & Newman, 2006
- Species: N. atlantica

Binomial name
- Neoibla atlantica (Stubbings, 1967) (originally Ibla atlantica)

Monotypic genus of barnacles

Neoibla is a monospecific genus of barnacles in the family Iblidae. It contains a single species, Neoibla atlantica, which is also the type species, and was originally assigned to the genus Ibla.

It is placed in its own subfamily, Neoiblinae.
