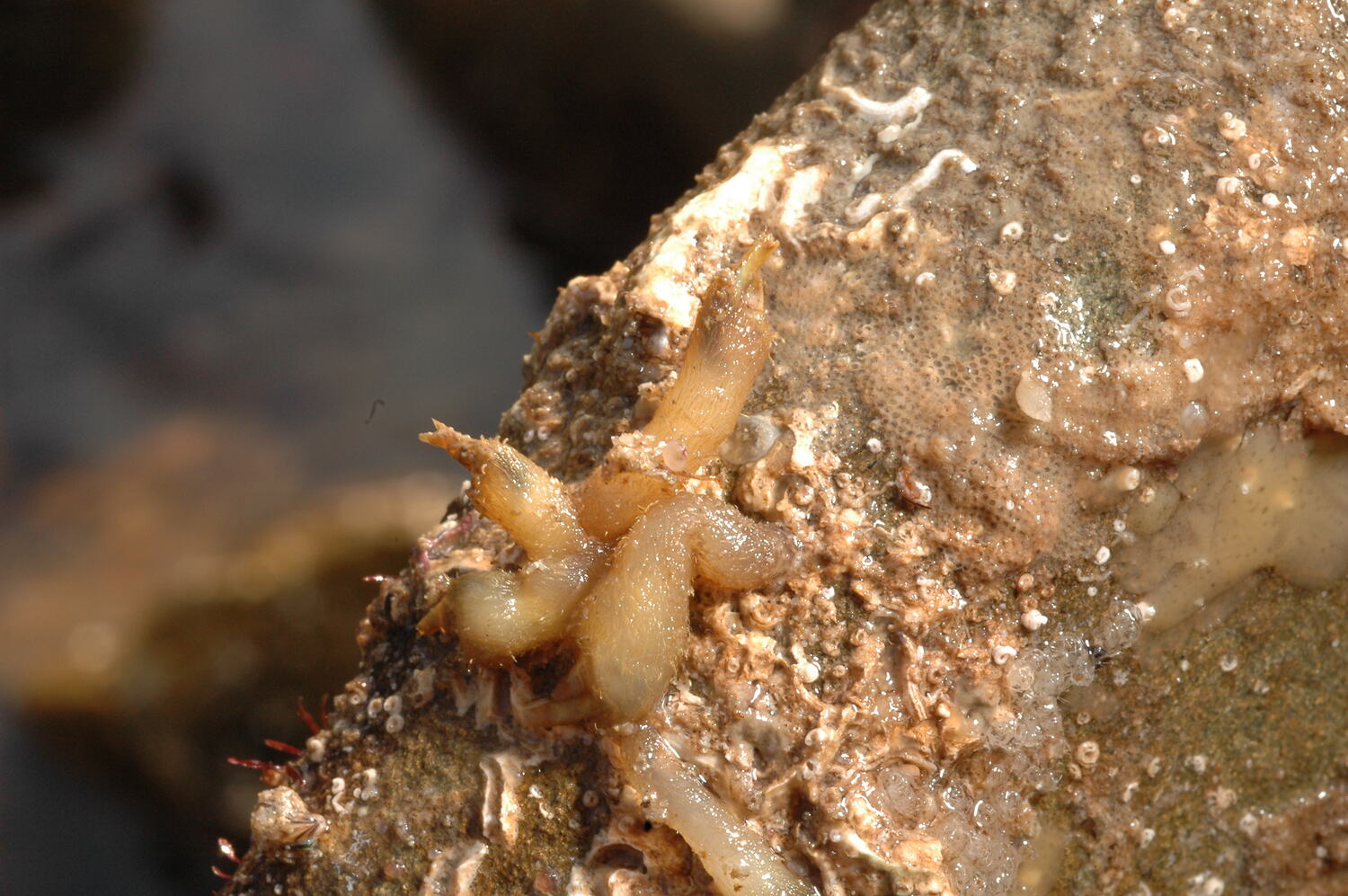
- Ibla quadrivalvis

Scientific classification
- Kingdom: Animalia
- Phylum: Arthropoda
- Class: Thecostraca
- Subclass: Cirripedia
- Infraclass: Thoracica
- Superorder: Phosphatothoracica
- Order: Iblomorpha
- Family: Iblidae; Leach, 1825

Subfamilies
- Iblinae Leach, 1825; Neoiblinae Buckeridge & Newman, 2006

= Iblidae =

Family of crustaceans

Iblidae is a family of crustaceans belonging to the order Iblomorpha. There are two genera in the family, each with its own subfamily.

Genera:

- Ibla Leach, 1825
- Neoibla Buckeridge & Newman, 2006
