= Rhabdias alabialis =

Scientific classification
- Kingdom: Animalia
- Phylum: Nematoda
- Class: Chromadorea
- Order: Rhabditida
- Family: Rhabdiasidae
- Genus: Rhabdias
- Species: R. alabialis

Binomial name
- Rhabdias alabialis Kuzmin, Tkach & Brooks, 2007

Species of roundworm

Rhabdias alabialis is a species of parasitic nematode in the family Rhabdiasidae. It was first found in lungs of the cane toad Bufo marinus in Costa Rica and Nicaragua. It can be distinguished from its cogenerates by its head morphology, i.e. its lips or pseudolabia absence, a slitlike oral opening, and its buccal capsule being triangular shaped in the apical view.
