= Reef safe =

Reef safe is a distinction used in the saltwater aquarium hobby to indicate that a fish or invertebrate is safe to add to a reef aquarium. There is no fish that is completely reef safe. Every fish that is commonly listed as reef safe are species that usually do not readily consume small fish or invertebrates. Fish listed as reef safe also do not bother fellow fish unless in some cases, for instance tangs, they do not get along with conspecifics and sometimes fish with similar color or body shape. Every fish has a personality, is different, and, in some cases, are opportunistic feeders. Tangs, which by most accounts are reef safe, may in adulthood eat some crustaceans shortly after they molt. Many larger predatory fish, for instance eels and pufferfish, will adapt very well to a reef tank and will be problem-free as long as they have sizable tank-mates and no crustaceans. Some aquarists have also had success in keeping smaller fish with predatory ones in reef tanks by adding the smaller fish at night, sometimes with newly rearranged rockwork.

== Reef safe ==
=== Fish ===
Anthias
Basslets
Blennies
Excludes fang blennies. A few species will nip at polyps and giant clam mantles.
Cardinalfish
Chromis
Clownfish
Excludes the maroon clown which can grow very aggressive and territorial.
Damsels
Excludes larger, more aggressive Dascyllus varieties.
Dwarf angelfish
Dwarf angelfish in a reef setting has been heavily debated.
Dottybacks
They may consume small shrimp and can be highly aggressive.
Dragonets
Foxface
Foxface and rabbitfish will occasionally eat certain corals if underfed.
Gobies
Jawfish
Pipefish
They can be killed by stinging corals and anemones.
Pseudochromis
They may consume small shrimp and can be highly aggressive.
Seahorses
They can be killed by stinging corals and anemones.
Tangs
Wrasse
There are both reef safe wrasses and ones that are notorious for killing small fish and invertebrates.
Planktivorous Triggerfish
With caution.
Melichthys spp.
Xanthichthys spp.
Odonus spp.

=== Invertebrates ===
Corals (Class Anthozoa)
There are aggressive types of coral which have sweeper tentacles that can burn other corals. These may require specific placement in an aquarium.
Crabs
Specifically small hermit crabs, anemone crabs, emerald mithrax crabs, and strawberry crabs.
Fan worms (Suborder Sabellida)
Giant clams
Scallops
Sea anemones (Order Actiniaria)
Anemones, especially carpet anemones can eat fish and burn corals to death requiring specific placement for specimens in an aquarium.
Sea cucumbers
Sea fans
Sea slugs
Starfish / Sea stars
There are many starfish which are not reef safe like crown-of-thorns starfish and chocolate chip sea star.
Shrimps
Peppermint shrimps, cleaner shrimps, pistol shrimps, anemone shrimps and blood red fire shrimps are better choices since the commonly available banded coral shrimp can kill fish, and the mantis shrimp will kill and eat most animals in a tank.
Snails
Some snails are parasitic but are rarely, if ever, offered in the saltwater aquaria trade.
Sponges
Tunicates (sea squirts)

== Reef unsafe ==
=== Fish ===
Non-dwarf Angelfish
This includes any of the larger angelfish.
Non-planktivorous Butterflyfish
Eat mainly or exclusively coral polyps
Non-planktivorous Triggerfish
This includes most triggerfish. Most triggerfish are highly aggressive carnivores that will eat many smaller fish and invertebrates in an aquarium. They also grow to be quite large.

=== Invertebrates ===
Sea apples
Currently short-lived in aquaria. They release a highly-toxic substance at death, decimating the aquarium.
