= Culcita =

Culcita is the scientific name of two genera of organisms and may refer to:

- Culcita (echinoderm), a genus of sea stars in the family Oreasteridae
- Culcita (plant), a genus of ferns in the family Culcitaceae
