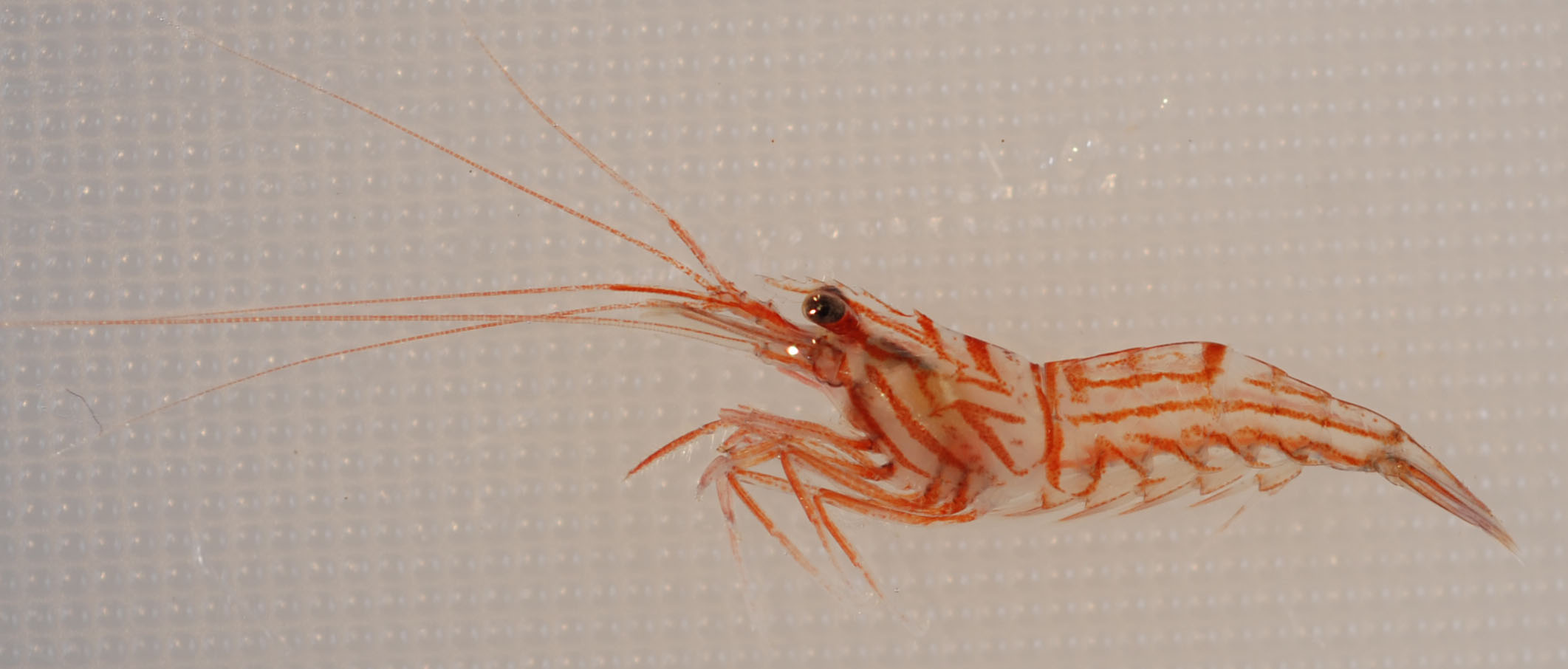
- Peppermint shrimp from Chesapeake Bay

Scientific classification
- Domain: Eukaryota
- Kingdom: Animalia
- Phylum: Arthropoda
- Class: Malacostraca
- Order: Decapoda
- Suborder: Pleocyemata
- Infraorder: Caridea
- Family: Lysmatidae
- Genus: Lysmata
- Species: L. wurdemanni

Binomial name
- Lysmata wurdemanni (Gibbes, 1850)

= Lysmata wurdemanni =

Species of crustacean

Lysmata wurdemanni is a species of saltwater shrimp in the family Lysmatidae, historically referred to as the peppermint shrimp in the marine aquarium trade. However, taxonomic revisions based on genetic and morphological data have revealed that many shrimp previously identified as L. wurdemanni actually belong to distinct species, including Lysmata boggessi, Lysmata rathbunae, and others native to the western Atlantic.

As a result, L. wurdemanni is now recognised as a more narrowly distributed species and is not the shrimp most commonly used in reef aquariums for Aiptasia control. That role is more accurately attributed to Lysmata boggessi, which has demonstrated reliable and consistent predation on Aiptasia and is widely regarded as the preferred species for natural pest control in reef systems.

== Description ==
It reaches 7 centimetres (2.8 in) in length, and is named for the bright red stripes on its otherwise translucent body, which are reminiscent of peppermint candies such as a candy cane. Its eggs, by contrast, are bright green.

== Distribution ==
Lysmata wurdemanni was originally described from specimens collected at Key West, Florida and Charleston, South Carolina. Its range extends along the Atlantic seaboard of the United States from Long Island to Florida, and along the Gulf of Mexico from Florida to Port Aransas, Texas. It may also occur in the northern Caribbean Sea, but this has not been confirmed.

== Reproduction ==
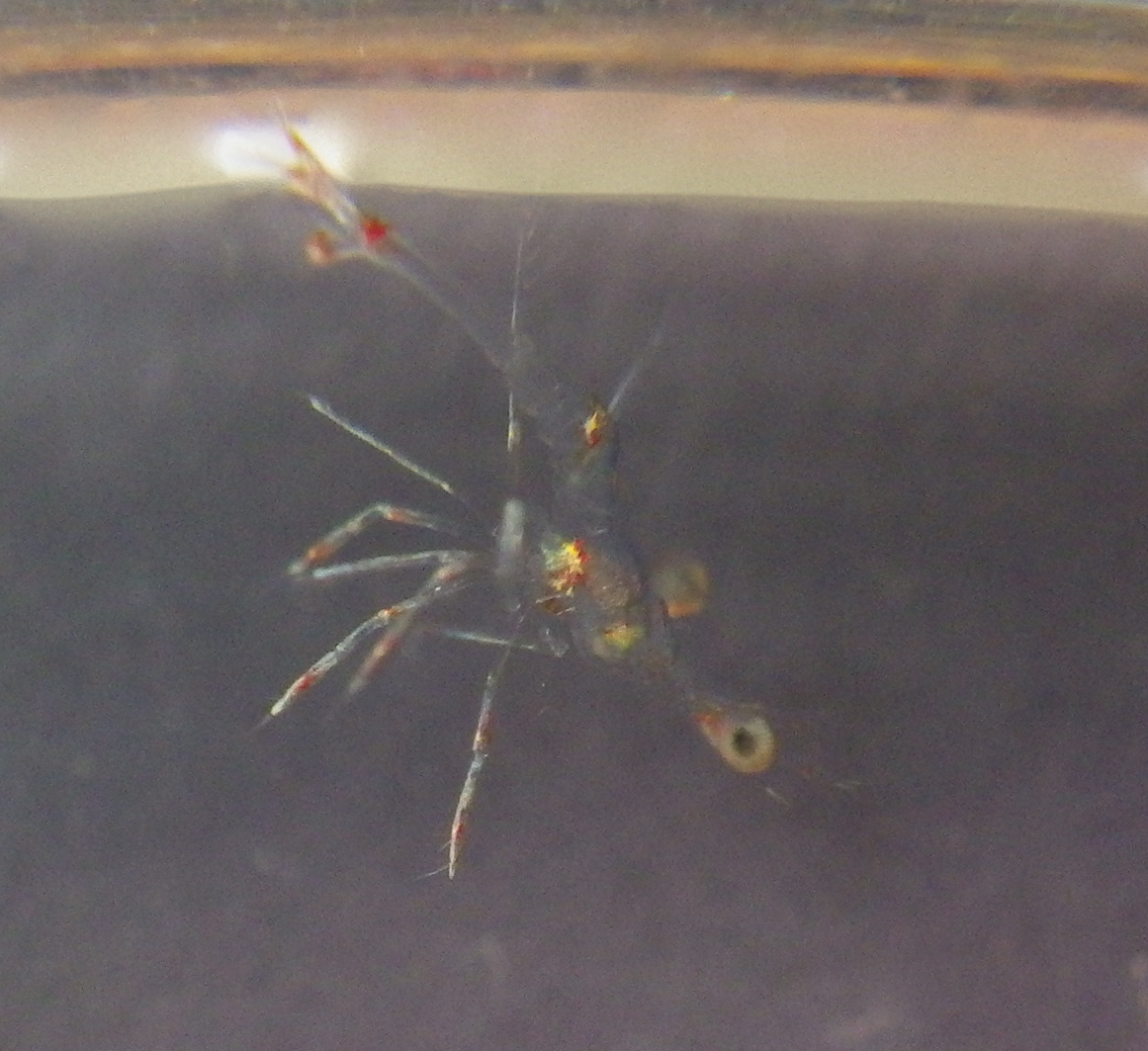
Freshly hatched peppermint shrimp zoea

Lysmata wurdemanni is a protandric simultaneous hermaphrodite. This means that it begins as a male but may later become a hermaphrodite. It has four moults as a male before changing sexes to become a euhermaphrodite. However, under certain conditions some males never change to hermaphrodites. In the euhermaphrodite stage the shrimp act as a male between moults and as a female immediately following a moult. During this hermaphroditic stage the shrimp gradually lose their male organs, likely because more energy is being allocated to the development of female reproductive organs.

Lysmata wurdemanni employs a 'pure searching' tactic for mate-finding in which the males are constantly searching for receptive females. Males use olfactory organs (aesthetascs) on their antennules to detect soluble female sex pheromones (distance pheromones). These pheromones are released 2–8 hours prior to female moulting. Guided by these chemical signals, males make their way to the female and will approach her. The male will then 'taste' the female's contact pheromones with his aesthetascs to make sure she is a suitable mate. If the chemicals are right, courtship may commence and, if courtship goes well, copulation will ensue. This process is very brief and occurs immediately post-moult, while the female's cuticle is new and soft.

== Aquaria ==
Lysmata wurdemanni is considered reef safe and functions as a cleaner shrimp, feeding on parasites, necrotic tissue, and detritus from other animals. While it has occasionally been reported to consume Aiptasia anemones, most shrimp previously identified as L. wurdemanni in the aquarium trade are now recognised as other species — particularly Lysmata boggessi, which has been confirmed through scientific study and aquarist observation as the most consistent and reliable predator of Aiptasia.

Like other species in the genus, L. wurdemanni is a protandric simultaneous hermaphrodite and reproduces readily in captivity. Its moulting and copulation cycles are similar to those observed in other cleaner shrimp such as Lysmata debelius, producing weekly batches of planktonic zoea larvae under favourable conditions.

== Taxonomy ==
The species L. wurdemanni has undergone reclassification and has been divided into four distinct species – L. wurdemanni, L. ankeri, L. bahia and L. boggessii. More recent molecular phylogenetic work found that L. wurdemanni is a cryptic species with at least 5 (and potentially 9) morphologically identical species being present across its range.
