= Bradynema rigidum =

Scientific classification
- Kingdom: Animalia
- Phylum: Nematoda
- Class: Secernentea
- Order: Tylenchida
- Family: Allantonematidae
- Genus: Bradynema
- Species: B. rigidum

Binomial name
- Bradynema rigidum (Von Siebold, 1836)

Synonyms
- Filaria rigidum Von Siebold, 1836

Species of roundworm

Bradynema rigidum is a parasitic species of nematode in the Allantonematidae family. The species has been classified as androdioecious. The parasite will live freely in its host; groupings of 2–3 to up to twenty may occur together.

In this species it was found that blastomeres in the 4 cell stage might be in 2 possible arrangements.

The species was originally discovered by Philipp Franz von Siebold in the 19th century. Otto zur Strassen received a doctorate in 1892 for writing his dissertation about the nematode. The larva development was first described by Wülker. In this species male larva develop into adults after 8 days, while the females develop into adults after 7 or 10 days. All adults are hermaphrodites. It has been suggested that males develop ovaries and become hermaphrodites while the females degenerate.
