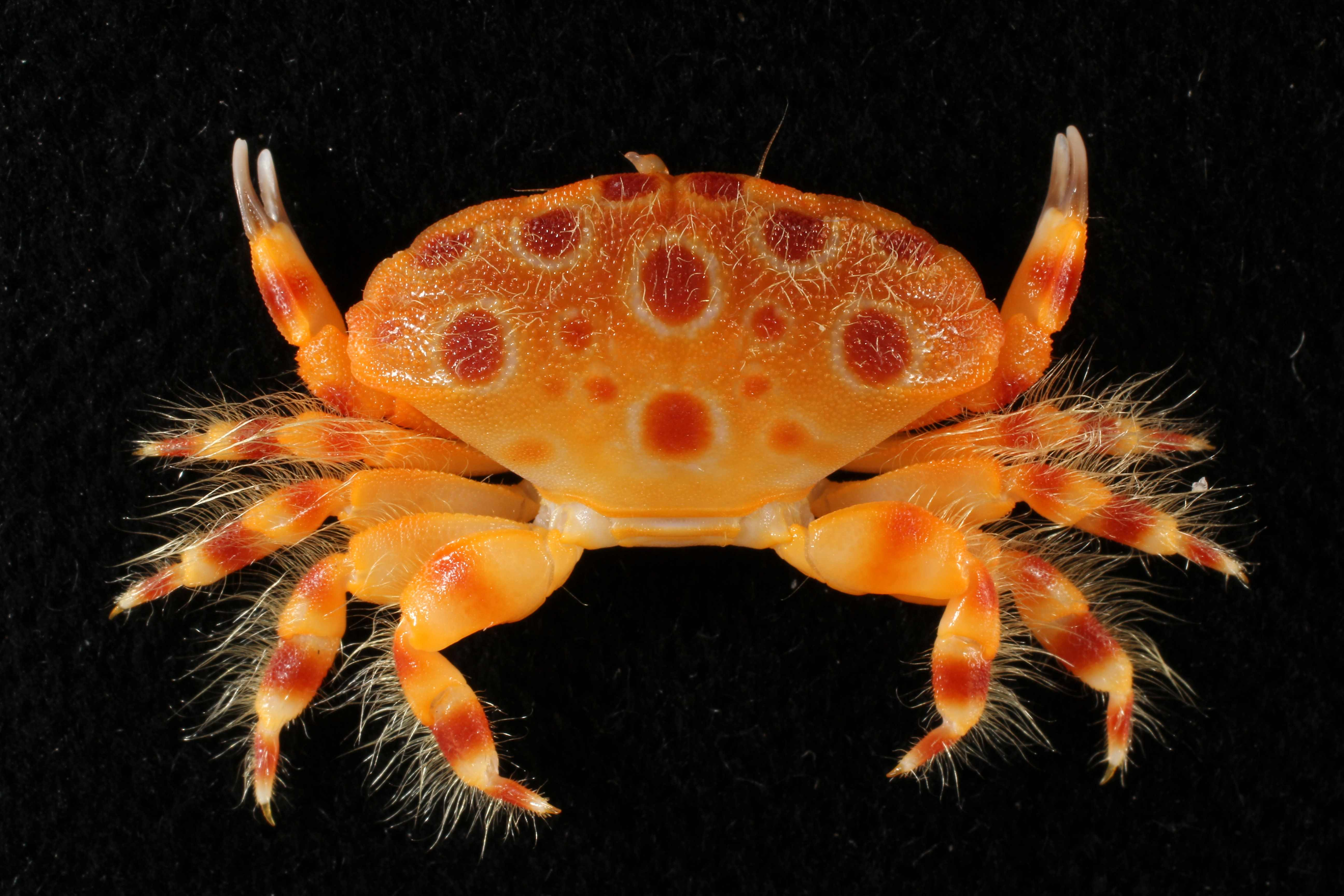
- Neoliomera moana

Scientific classification
- Domain: Eukaryota
- Kingdom: Animalia
- Phylum: Arthropoda
- Class: Malacostraca
- Order: Decapoda
- Suborder: Pleocyemata
- Infraorder: Brachyura
- Family: Xanthidae
- Subfamily: Liomerinae
- Genus: Neoliomera; Odhner, 1925

= Neoliomera =

Genus of crabs

Neoliomera is a genus of crabs in the family Xanthidae, containing the following species:

- Neoliomera aphrodita (Boone, 1934)
- Neoliomera cerasinus Ng, 2002
- Neoliomera demani Forest & Guinot, 1961
- Neoliomera fragraea Ho & Ng, 2014
- Neoliomera insularis (Adams & White, 1849)
- Neoliomera intermedia Odhner, 1925
- †Neoliomera kuohwai Hu, 1981
- Neoliomera lippa (Nobili, 1905)
- †Neoliomera minuta Beschin, Busulini & Tessier, 2015
- Neoliomera moana Poupin & Starmer, 2013
- Neoliomera nobilii Odhner, 1925
- Neoliomera ovata Tweedie, 1950
- †Neoliomera paleogenica Beschin, Busulini, De Angeli & Tessier, 2007
- Neoliomera praetexta (Rathbun, 1906)
- Neoliomera pubescens (H. Milne Edwards, 1834)
- Neoliomera richteroides Sakai, 1969
- Neoliomera richtersi (De Man, 1889)
- Neoliomera sabaea (Nobili, 1905)
- Neoliomera striata Buitendijk, 1941
- Neoliomera sundaica (De Man, 1888)
- Neoliomera themisto (De Man, 1889)
- Neoliomera variolosa (A. Milne-Edwards, 1873)
- †Neoliomera zovoensis De Angeli & Garassino, 2020
