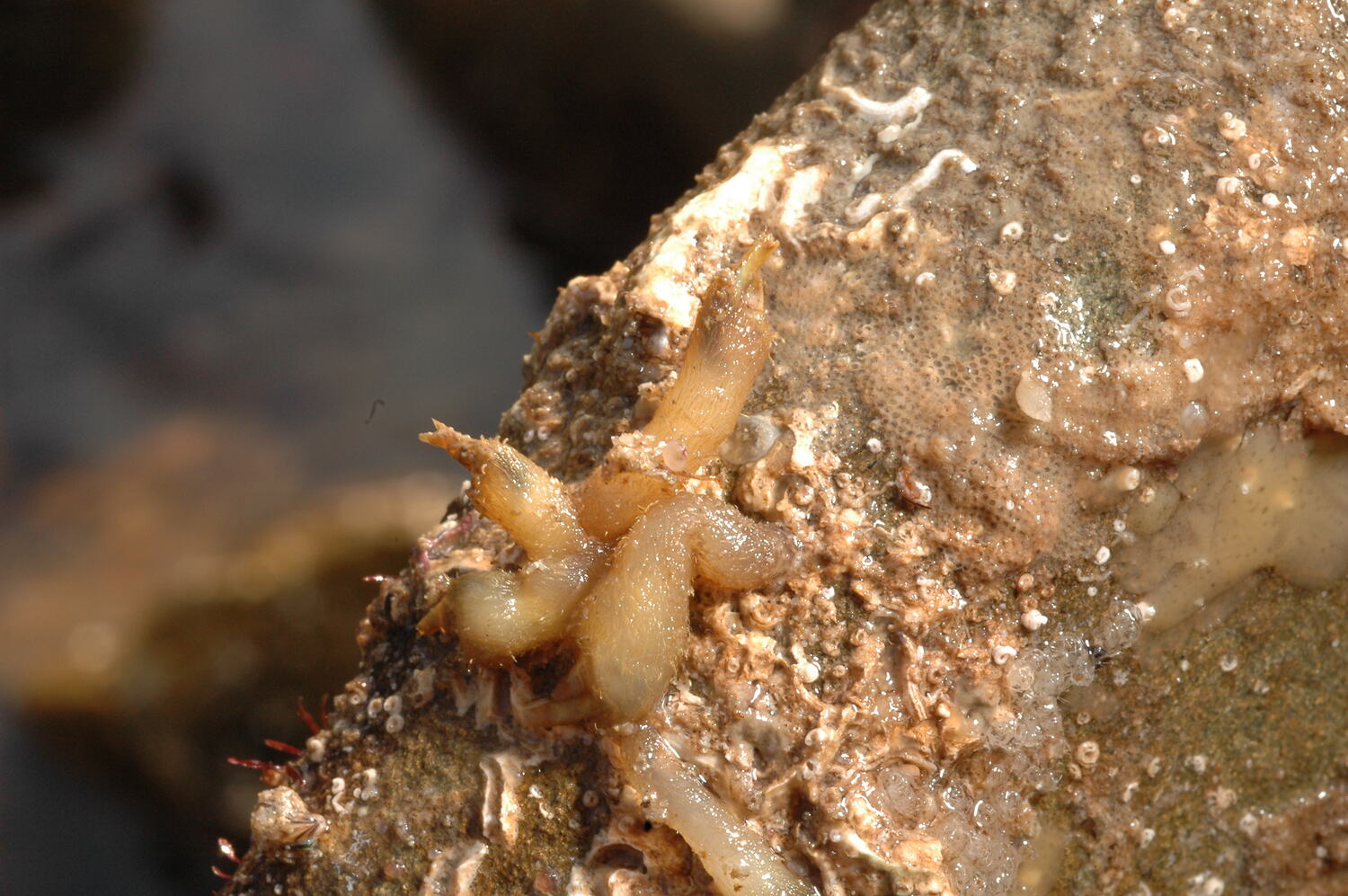
- Ibla quadrivalvis

Scientific classification
- Kingdom: Animalia
- Phylum: Arthropoda
- Class: Thecostraca
- Subclass: Cirripedia
- Infraclass: Thoracica
- Superorder: Phosphatothoracica
- Order: Iblomorpha; Buckeridge & Newman, 2006

= Iblomorpha =

Suborder of crustaceans

Iblomorpha is a small order of barnacles in the class Thecostraca. There are only two families and about eight described species in Iblomorpha. This group has barnacles which use calcium phosphate in their shell, and species that protect themselves against predators with poison.

== Genera ==
These families, subfamilies, and genera belong to the order Iblomorpha:

- Order Iblomorpha Buckeridge & Newman, 2006
  - Family Iblidae Leach, 1825
    - Subfamily Iblinae Leach, 1825
      - Genus Ibla Leach, 1825
    - Subfamily Neoiblinae Buckeridge & Newman, 2006
      - Genus Neoibla Buckeridge & Newman, 2006
  - Family Idioiblidae Buckeridge & Newman, 2006
    - Subfamily Chaetolepadinae Buckeridge & Newman, 2006
      - Genus Chaetolepas Studer, 1889
      - Genus Chitinolepas Buckeridge & Newman, 2006
    - Subfamily Idioiblinae Buckeridge & Newman, 2006
      - Genus Idioibla Buckeridge & Newman, 2006
