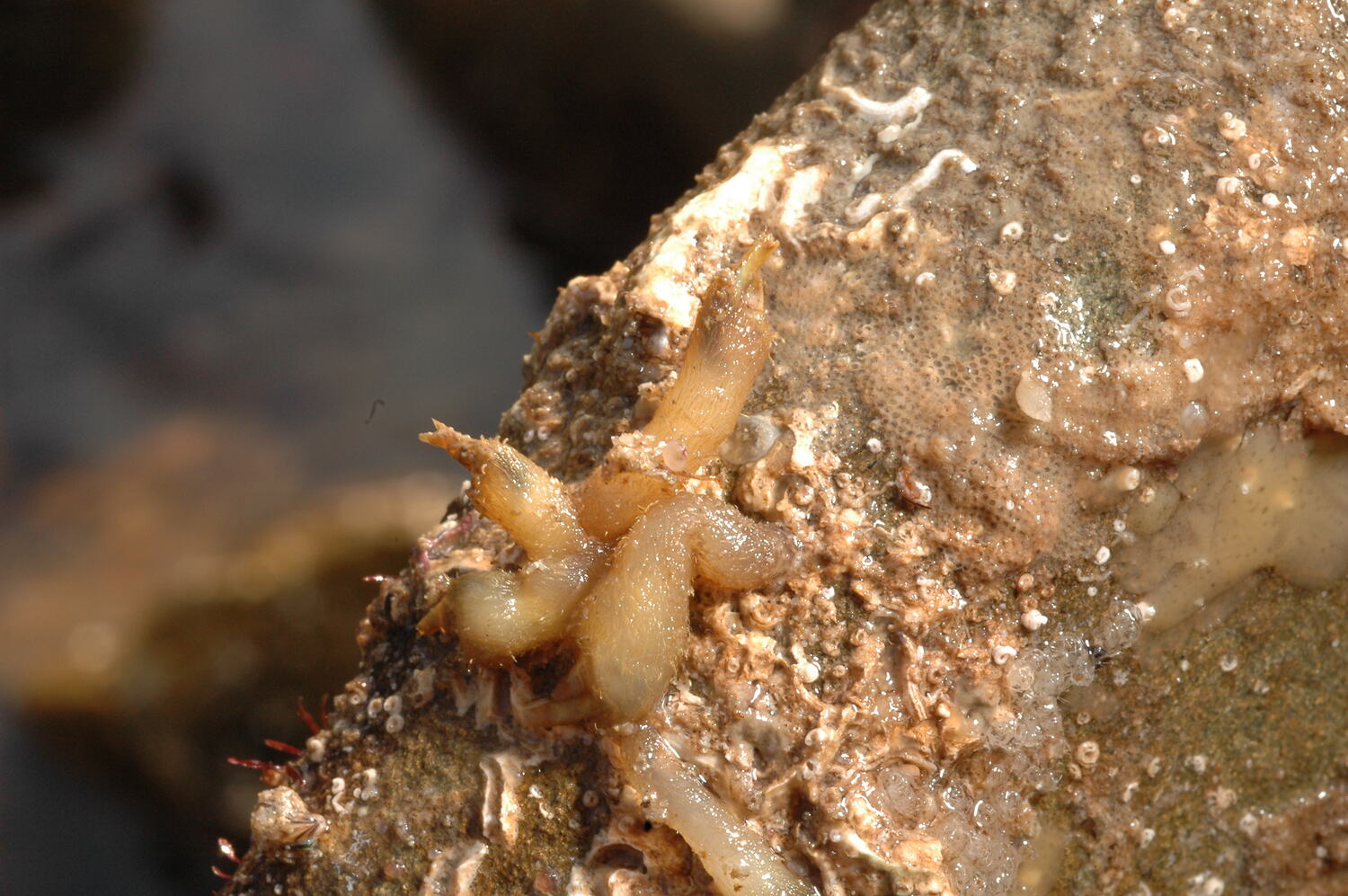
- Ibla quadrivalvis

Scientific classification
- Kingdom: Animalia
- Phylum: Arthropoda
- Class: Thecostraca
- Subclass: Cirripedia
- Infraclass: Thoracica
- Superorder: Phosphatothoracica; Gale, 2019

Orders
- Iblomorpha; †Eolepadomorpha

= Phosphatothoracica =

Superorder of barnacles

Phosphatothoracica is a paraphyletic superorder of barnacles in the infraclass Thoracica. It contains one extant order, Iblomorpha, as well as the extinct order Eolepadomorpha.
