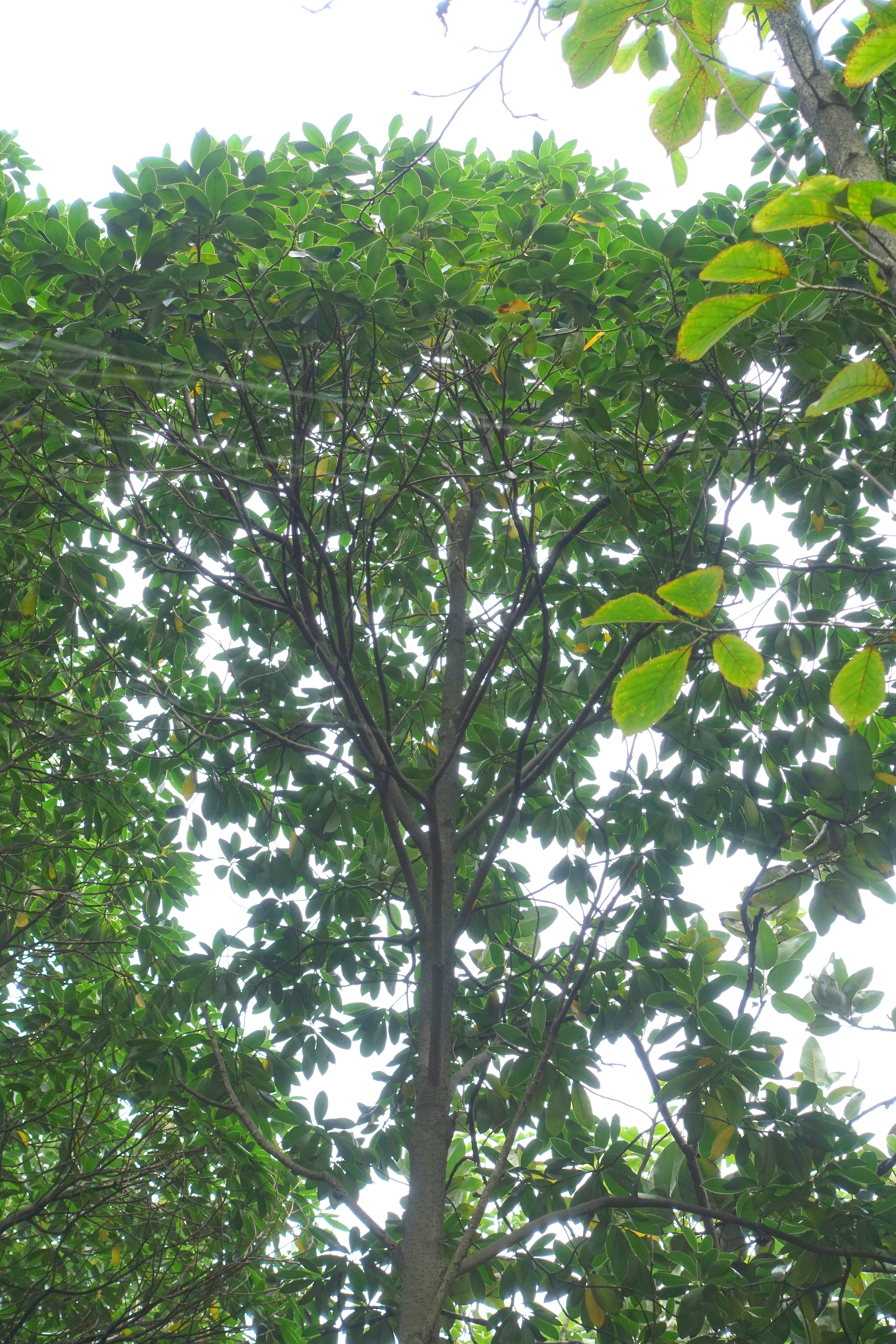
- At the Chengdu Botanical Garden

Conservation status
- Endangered (IUCN 3.1)

Scientific classification
- Kingdom: Plantae
- Clade: Embryophytes
- Clade: Tracheophytes
- Clade: Spermatophytes
- Clade: Angiosperms
- Clade: Magnoliids
- Order: Magnoliales
- Family: Magnoliaceae
- Genus: Magnolia
- Species: M. lotungensis

Binomial name
- Magnolia lotungensis Chun & C.H.Tsoong

Synonyms
- Magnolia nitida var. lotungensis (Chun & C.H.Tsoong) B.L.Chen & Noot.; Parakmeria lotungensis (Chun & C.H.Tsoong) Y.W.Law; Parakmeria lotungensis var. xiangxiensis C.L.Peng & L.H.Yan

= Magnolia lotungensis =

Species of flowering plant

Magnolia lotungensis (syn. Parakmeria lotungensis), the eastern joy lotus tree, is a species of flowering plant in the family Magnoliaceae, native to southern China, including Hainan. An androdioecious, hexaploid evergreen tree reaching 30 m (98 ft), it is typically found in forests from 700 to 1,400 m (2,300 to 4,600 ft) above sea level. It is used as a street tree in a number of southern Chinese cities. Due to its strength, easy maintenance, narrow growth habit with a rounded crown, and cold hardiness, it is showing promise as an ornamental tree in North America and Europe.
