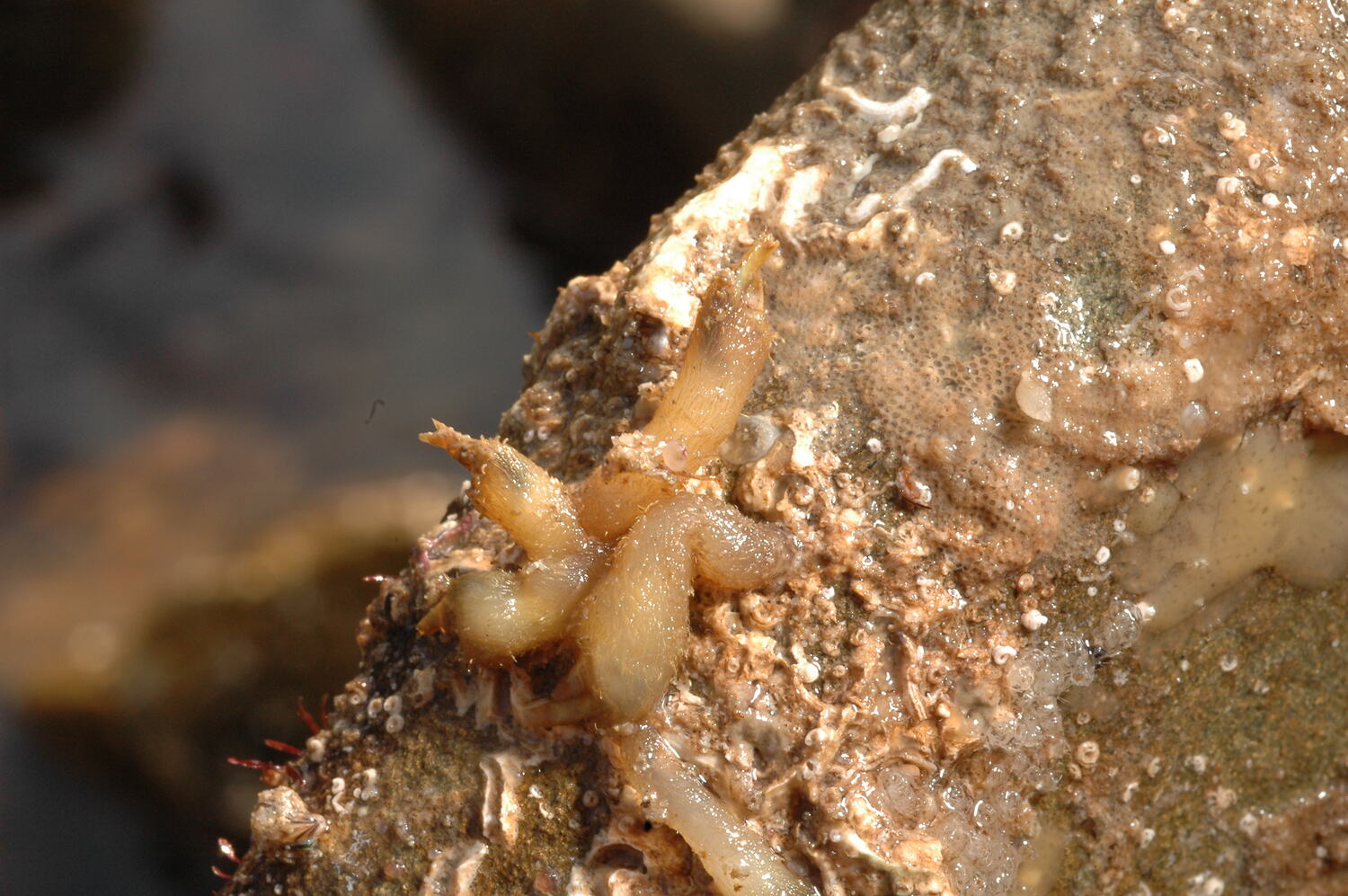
- Ibla quadrivalvis

Scientific classification
- Kingdom: Animalia
- Phylum: Arthropoda
- Class: Thecostraca
- Subclass: Cirripedia
- Order: Iblomorpha
- Family: Iblidae
- Subfamily: Iblinae; Leach, 1825
- Genus: Ibla; Leach, 1825

Species
- See text

= Ibla =

Genus of barnacles

Ibla is a genus of barnacle. In 1848, Charles Darwin studied the genus and found species with hermaphrodites and tiny males. In this genus the number of androdioecious species is uncertain because some authors use the words female and hermaphrodite interchangeably.

== Species ==
Species in this genus include:

- Ibla cumingi
- Ibla quadrivalvis
- Ibla sibogae
- Ibla pygmaea
- Ibla idiotica
- Ibla cuvieriana
