= Sudhausia =

Scientific classification
- Domain: Eukaryota
- Kingdom: Animalia
- Phylum: Nematoda
- Class: Chromadorea
- Order: Rhabditida
- Family: Diplogastridae
- Genus: Sudhausia; Herrmann, Ragsdale, Kanzaki & Sommer, 2013

Genus of roundworms

Sudhausia is a genus of nematodes (roundworms) of the family Diplogastridae. They live in association with dung beetles and are primarily known from Africa. Species of Sudhausia show a suite of biological features that, together, are unusual for nematodes and animals in general: hermaphrodites, which are females in form, mature to produce offspring (eggs and larvae) before they are adults and thus even capable of mating, and their eggs grow in size during development. Hermaphrodites are also always live-bearing, which is unusual for nematodes under non-stressful conditions. The genus is named in honor of Walter Sudhaus, a German nematologist.

== Species ==
- Sudhausia aristotokia, associated with Onthophagus dung beetles in Ghana
- Sudhausia crassa, isolated from dung beetles of Onthophagus and the tribe Canthonini in South Africa and from Scarabaeus in Corsica
- Sudhausia floridensis, associated with Onthophagus dung beetles in Florida
