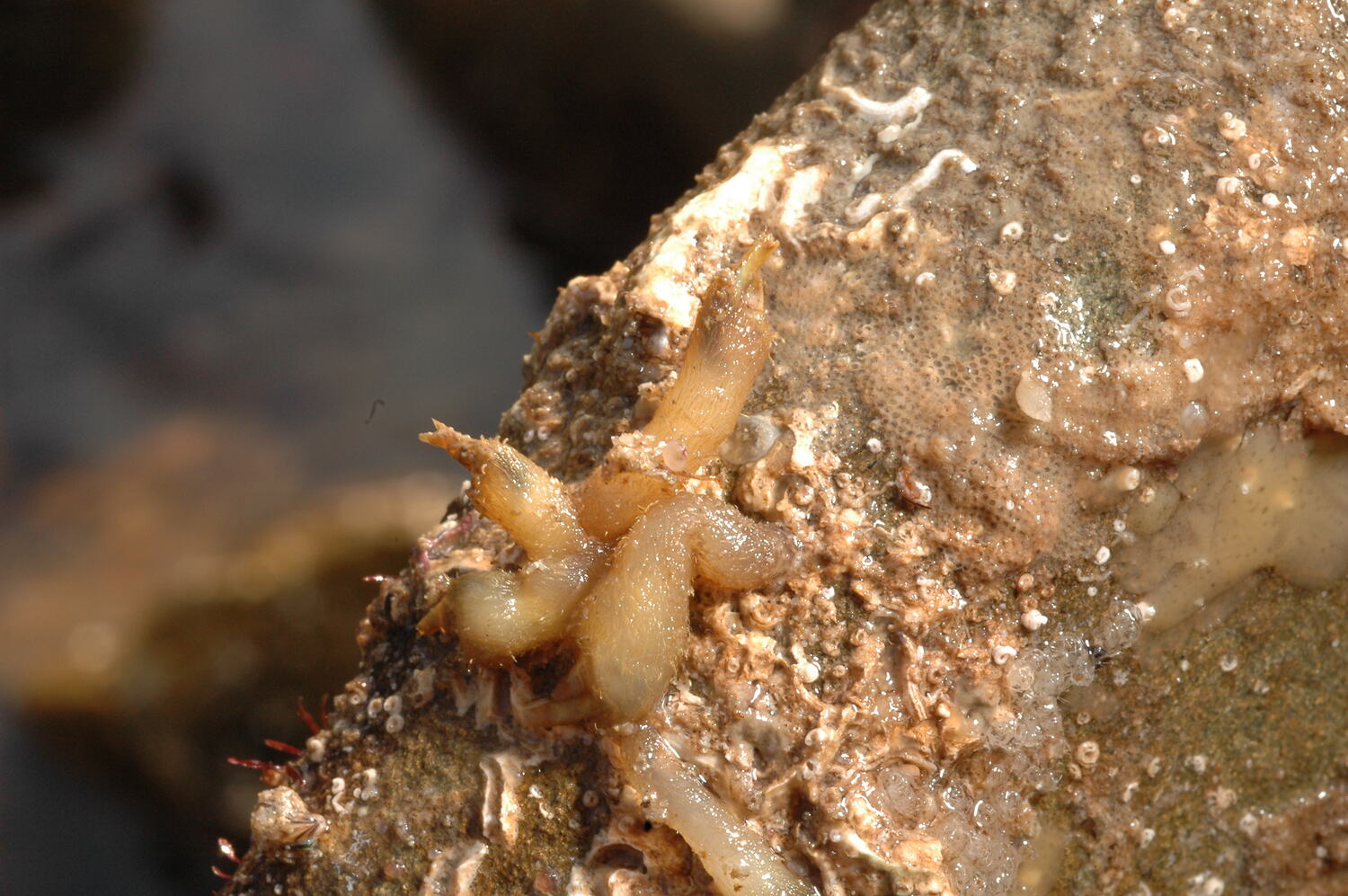

Scientific classification
- Kingdom: Animalia
- Phylum: Arthropoda
- Clade: Pancrustacea
- Class: Thecostraca
- Subclass: Cirripedia
- Order: Iblomorpha
- Family: Iblidae
- Genus: Ibla
- Species: I. quadrivalvis

Binomial name
- Ibla quadrivalvis (Cuvier, 1817)

Synonyms
- Ibla cuvieriana Gray, 1825

= Ibla quadrivalvis =

Species of barnacle

Ibla quadrivalvis is a species of barnacle in the Iblidae family. The common name for this species is hairy stalked barnacle.

The species was studied by Charles Darwin. He first described this species as androdioecious.

They live under rocks, in damp cracks and among colonies of tube worms. They are the only stalked barnacle living permanently on rocky shores of south-eastern Australia.
