= Rhabdias =

Scientific classification
- Kingdom: Animalia
- Phylum: Nematoda
- Class: Chromadorea
- Order: Rhabditida
- Family: Rhabdiasidae
- Genus: Rhabdias; Stiles & Hassall, 1905

Genus of nematodes

Rhabdias is a genus of nematodes belonging to the family Rhabdiasidae. The genus has cosmopolitan distribution and includes over 90 species mainly parasitic in the lungs of amphibians and reptiles.

Systematics of species of Rhadias is not easy due to the usual absence of males and the morphological similarity in females.

== Species ==
The genus includes the following species:

- Rhabdias aegyptiaca
- Rhabdias africanus
- Rhabdias alabialis
- Rhabdias ambystomae
- Rhabdias americanus
- Rhabdias androgyna
- Rhabdias australensis
- Rhabdias bakeri
- Rhabdias bdellophis
- Rhabdias bermani
- Rhabdias bicornis
- Rhabdias blommersiae
- Rhabdias brachylaimus
- Rhabdias breviensis
- Rhabdias bufonis
- Rhabdias bulbicauda
- Rhabdias collaris
- Rhabdias dehradunensis
- Rhabdias delangei
- Rhabdias dossei
- Rhabdias elaphe
- Rhabdias elegans
- Rhabdias engelbrechti
- Rhabdias escheri
- Rhabdias esculentarum
- Rhabdias filicaudalis
- Rhabdias fuelleborni
- Rhabdias fuscovenosa
- Rhabdias galactonoti
- Rhabdias garhwalensis
- Rhabdias glaurungi
- Rhabdias globocephala
- Rhabdias hermafrodita
- Rhabdias hermaphrodita
- Rhabdias himalayanus
- Rhabdias hylae
- Rhabdias incerta
- Rhabdias japalurae
- Rhabdias joaquinensis
- Rhabdias kafunata
- Rhabdias kiri
- Rhabdias kongmongthaensis
- Rhabdias kuzmini
- Rhabdias lamothei
- Rhabdias macrocephalum
- Rhabdias madagascariensis
- Rhabdias manantlanensis
- Rhabdias mariauxi
- Rhabdias montana
- Rhabdias mucronata
- Rhabdias multiproles
- Rhabdias nigrovenosum
- Rhabdias nipponica
- Rhabdias odilebaini
- Rhabdias ohlerae
- Rhabdias okuensis
- Rhabdias paraensis
- Rhabdias peninsularis
- Rhabdias picardiae
- Rhabdias pocoto
- Rhabdias polypedates
- Rhabdias pseudospherocephala
- Rhabdias rane
- Rhabdias rhacophori
- Rhabdias rhampholeonis
- Rhabdias rotundata
- Rhabdias rubrovenosa
- Rhabdias savagei
- Rhabdias shortii
- Rhabdias sphaerocephala
- Rhabdias stenocephala
- Rhabdias stomatica
- Rhabdias sylvestris
- Rhabdias tanyai
- Rhabdias tarichae
- Rhabdias thapari
- Rhabdias tobagoensis
- Rhabdias tokyoensis
- Rhabdias truncata
- Rhabdias vencesi
- Rhabdias waiapi
