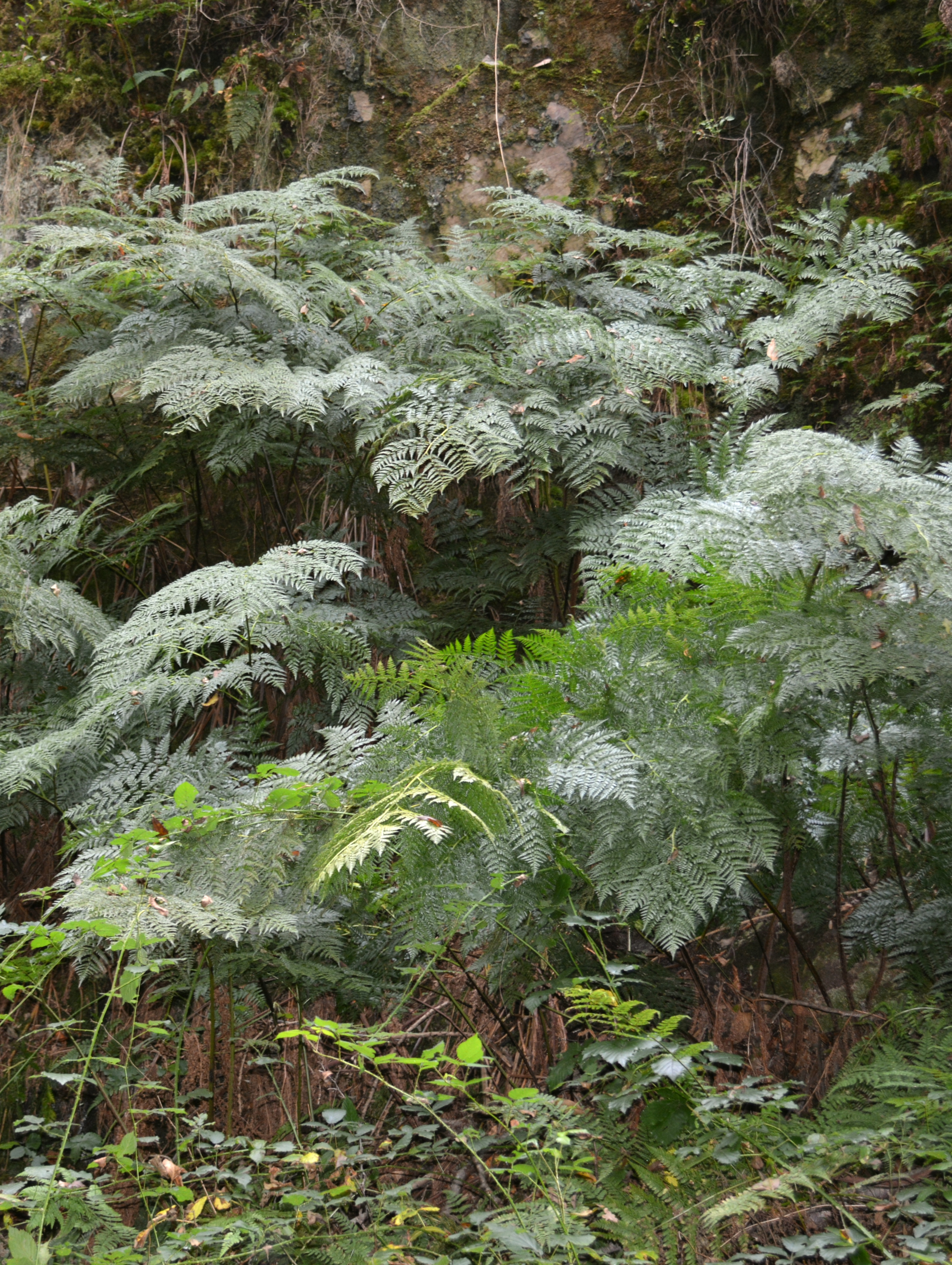

Conservation status
- Near Threatened (IUCN 3.1)

Scientific classification
- Kingdom: Plantae
- Clade: Tracheophytes
- Division: Polypodiophyta
- Class: Polypodiopsida
- Order: Cyatheales
- Family: Culcitaceae
- Genus: Culcita
- Species: C. macrocarpa

Binomial name
- Culcita macrocarpa C. Presl

Synonyms
- Dicksonia culcita L'Hér.; Balantium culcita (L'Hér.) Kaulf.

= Culcita macrocarpa =

Species of plant

Culcita macrocarpa, the woolly tree fern, is a species of fern in the family Culcitaceae native to Macaronesia and parts of the Iberian Peninsula, where it might have been introduced. It is the only member of the order Cyatheales that is native to Europe.

== Description ==
Culcita macrocarpa is a large plant that can reach up to 2 metres (6.6 ft) in height and has fronds up to 2 metres (6.6 ft) long. Its rhizomes are thickly coated with long silky, light brown hairs. Stipes are one third of the blade length, it has glabrous stabs and rachis and a shiny green, leathery, triangular blade on top. Serums are protected by the blade's curved lobes.

== Distribution and habitat ==
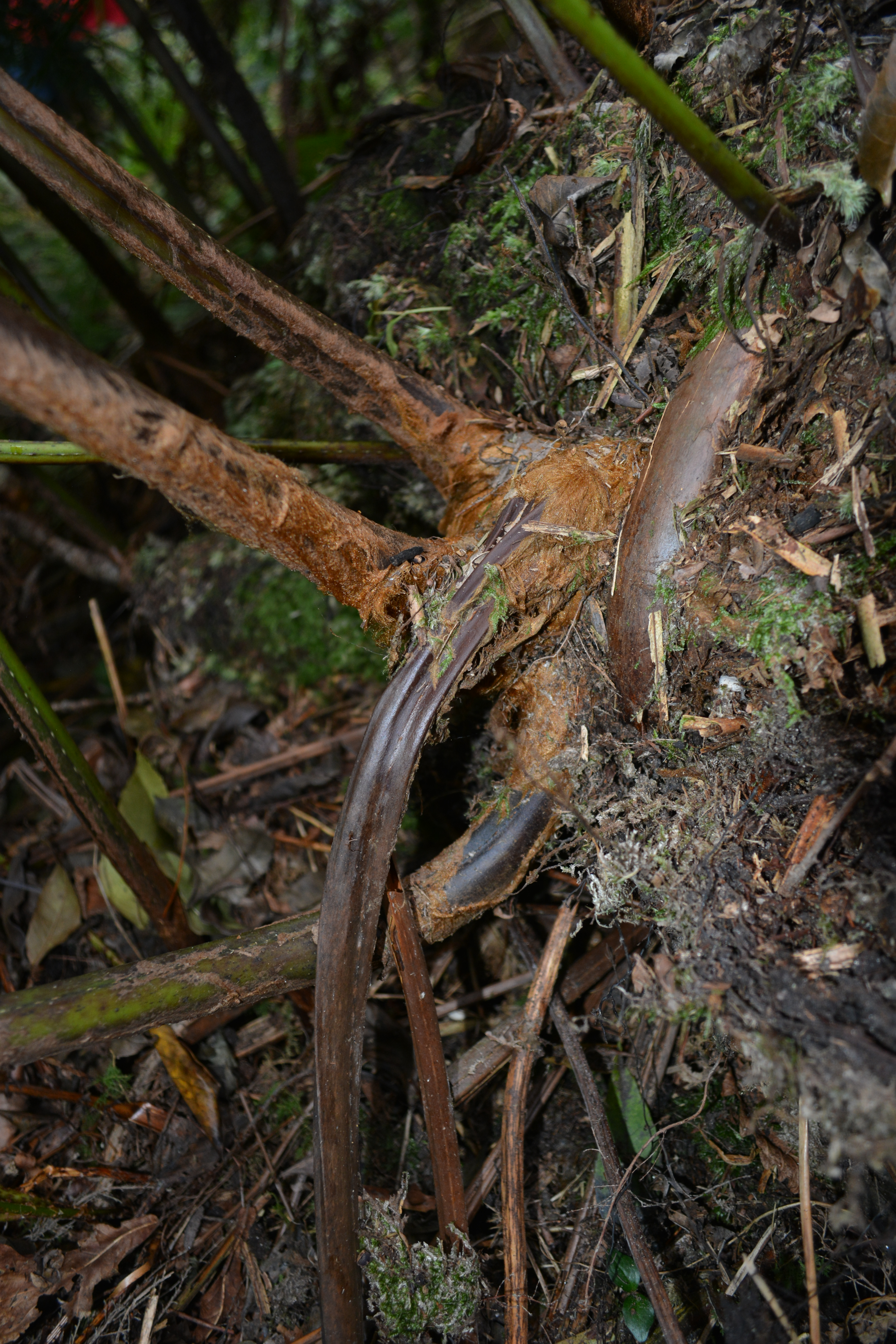
Culcita macrocarpa stipes

Culcita macrocarpa is endemic to Portugal and Spain, both on the Iberian Peninsula and Macaronesia. It can be found in all of the Azores islands except Graciosa, in the Island of Madeira part of the Madeira Archipelago and in Tenerife on the Canary Islands. It is very rare in Santa Maria. In the Iberian Peninsula it is found in the north Cantabrian and Asturian coasts, northern Galicia and in mountainous areas around Porto and the Province of Cádiz. The populations found in Iberia might be the result of an introduction.

It grows on siliceous rocky slopes, especially in deep valleys under evergreen forest and near coastal areas, sometimes in scrubland up to 1,100 metres (3,600 ft) elevation. It is usually found close to waterfalls or streams that provide moisture in the form of spray. This species requires shade and warm temperatures all year round, with high atmospheric humidity to flourish.

It grows in all types of soils but avoids limestone substrates and is especially common on the herbaceous layer of high elevation montane forests of the Azores.

== Threats ==
Culcita macrocarpa is threatened by the conversion of forests into plantations. In mainland Portugal, where it is classified as critically endangered, fire is the main threat to the species and eucalyptus plantations cause soil desiccation that prevent the species from growing.
