= Otto zur Strassen =

German zoologist

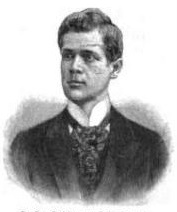

Otto Karl Ladislaus zur Strassen (9 May 1869, in Berlin – 21 April 1961, in Oberstedten) was a German zoologist. As an advocate of Darwinism, his primarily focused on biological morphology and developmental mechanics.

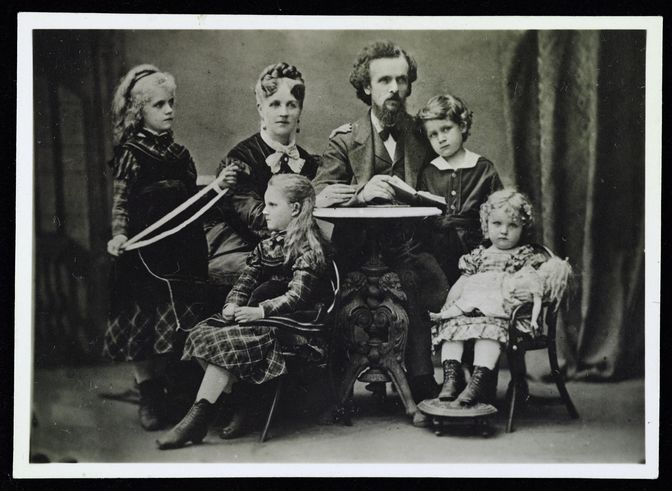
Otto zur Strassen at the age of six (at right, with his head on his father Melchior's shoulder)

Otto was the son of sculptor Melchior Anton and his wife Cecilia. He studied natural sciences at the Universities of Leipzig and Freiburg, obtaining his doctorate in 1892 at Leipzig with a dissertation on Bradynema rigidum. After graduation, he furthered his education in Naples and in Russia. In 1901 he became an associate professor of specialized zoology at Leipzig, later working as a full professor of zoology at the University of Frankfurt am Main (1914–1935). In 1922/23 he served as university rector.

In 1898/99 he took part in the first German Tiefsee-Expedition (deep-sea expedition) aboard the Valdivia. From 1909 to 1934, he was director of the Senckenberg Museum in Frankfurt am Main.

== World War 1 and Vernon Kellogg's Headquarters Nights ==
Zur Strassen was the real name of the biologist who was written about by Vernon Kellogg in his 1917 book Headquarters Nights. as "captain-professor" "Professor von Flussen with whom Kellogg "talked out the biological argument for war, and especially for this war." According to Kellogg,

Professor von Flussen is Neo-Darwinian, as are most German biologists and natural philosophers. The creed of the Allmacht of a natural selection based on violent and fatal competitive struggle is the gospel of the German intellectuals; all else is illusion and anathema. [...] But as with the different ant species, struggle -- bitter, ruthless struggle -- is the rule among the different human groups.

This struggle not only must go on, for that is the natural law, but it should go on, so that this natural law may work out in its cruel, inevitable way the salvation of the human species. By its salvation is meant its desirable natural evolution. That human group which is in the most advanced evolutionary stage as regards internal organization and form of social relationship is best, and should, for the sake of the species, be preserved at the expense of the less advanced, the less effective. It should win in the struggle for existence, and this struggle should occur precisely that the various types may be tested, and the best not only preserved, but put in position to impose its kind of social organization -- its Kultur -- on the others, or, alternatively, to destroy and replace them.

This is the disheartening kind of argument that I faced at Headquarters; argument logically constructed on premises chosen by the other fellow. Add to these assumed premises of the Allmacht of struggle and selection based on it, and the contemplation of mankind as a congeries of different, mutually irreconcilable kinds, like the different ant species, the additional assumption that the Germans are the chosen race, and German social and political organization the chosen type of human community life, and you have a wall of logic and conviction that you can break your head against but can never shatter -- by headwork. You long for the muscles of Samson.

THE danger from Germany is, I have said, that the Germans believe what they say. And they act on this belief. Professor von Flussen says that this war is necessary as a test of the German position and claim. If Germany is beaten, it will prove that she has moved along the wrong evolutionary line, and should be beaten. If she wins, it will prove that she is on the right way, and that the rest of the world, at least that part which we and the Allies represent, is on the wrong way and should, for the sake of the right evolution of the human race, be stopped and put on the right way—or else be destroyed as unfit.

Professor von Flussen is sure that Germany’s way is the right way, and that the biologic evolutionary factors are so all-controlling in determining human destiny, that this being biologically right is certain to insure German victory. If the wrong and unnatural alternative of an Allied victory should obtain, then he would prefer to die in the catastrophe and not have to live in a world perversely resistant to natural law. He means it all. He will act on this belief. He does act on it, indeed. He opposes ali mercy, all compromise with human soft-heartedness. Apart from his horrible academic casuistry and his conviction that the individual is nothing, the State all, he is a reasoning and a warmhearted man. So are some other Germans. But for him and them the test of right in this struggle is success in it. So let every means to victory be used. The only intelligence Germans should follow in these days is the intelligence of the General Staff; the only things to believe and to repeat are the statements of the official bureau of publicity.

There is no reasoning with this sort of thing, no finding of any heart or soul in it. There is only one kind of answer: resistance by brutal force; war to a decision. It is the only argument in rebuttal comprehensible to these men at Headquarters into whose hands the German people have put their destiny.

== Written works ==
Zur Strassen was editor of "Brehms Tierleben" (completely revised 4th edition, 1911–1918). The following is a list of some of his noteworthy written efforts.

- Embryonalentwicklung der Ascaris megalocephala, 1896 – Embryonic development of Ascaris megalocephala.
- Ueber die Mechanik der Epithelbildung, 1903 – On the mechanics of epithelialization.
- Anthraconema, eine neue Gattung freilebender Nematoden, 1904 – Anthraconema, a new genus of free-living nematode.
- Die Geschichte der Riesen von Ascaris megalocephala als Grundlage zu einer Entwicklungsmechanik dieser Spezies, Stuttgart 1906 – History on the gigantism of Ascaris megalocephala as a basis for developmental mechanics of the species.
- "Animal behavior and development", (published in English, 1909).
- Plastisch wirkende Augenflecke und die "Geschlechtliche Zuchtwahl", Jena 1935 – Plastic-looking eye spots and "sexual selection".
- Neue Beiträge zur Entwicklungsmechanik der Nematoden, Stuttgart 1959 – New contributions towards the developmental mechanics of nematodes.
