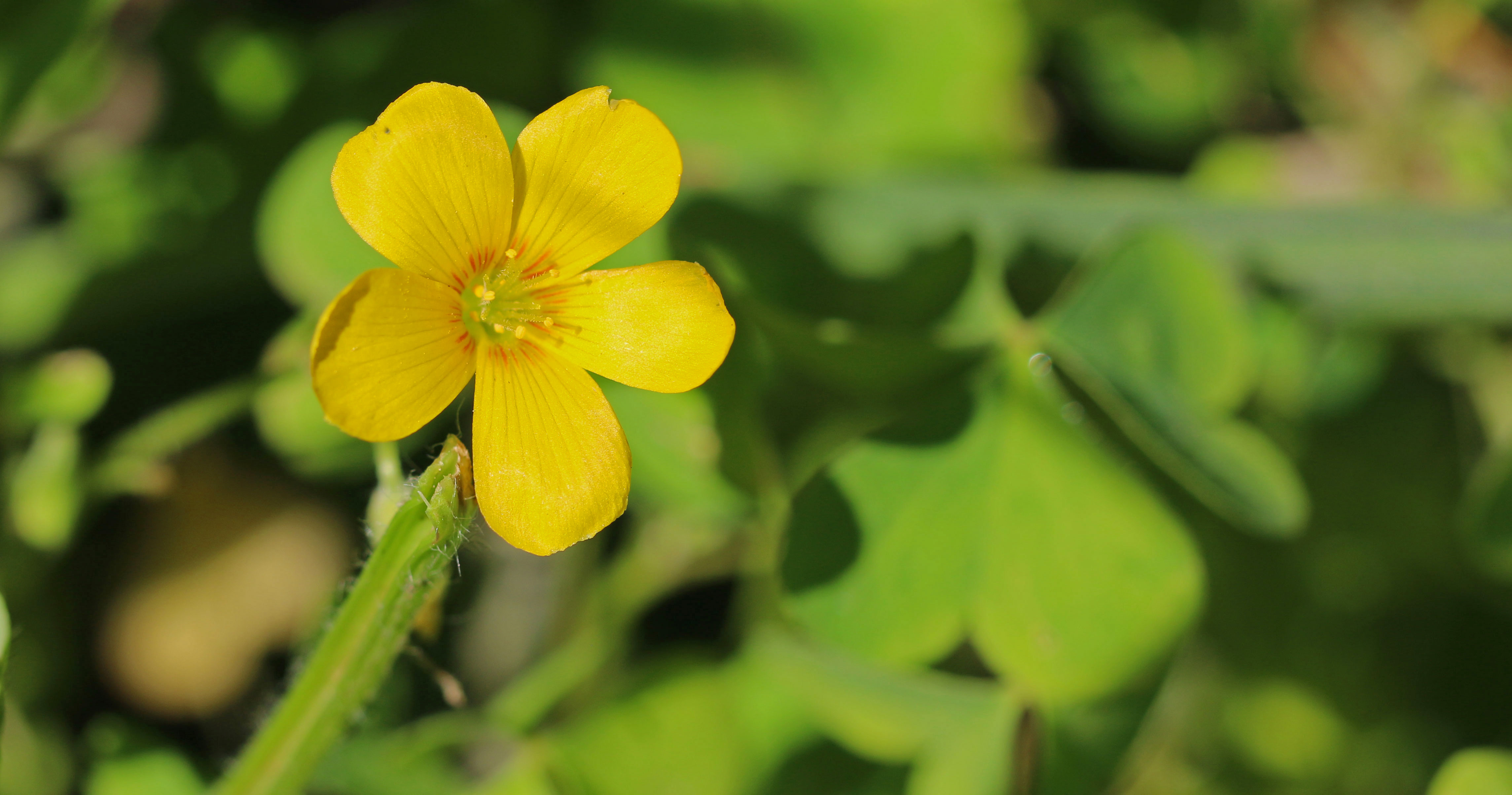

Scientific classification
- Kingdom: Plantae
- Clade: Tracheophytes
- Clade: Angiosperms
- Clade: Eudicots
- Clade: Rosids
- Order: Oxalidales
- Family: Oxalidaceae
- Genus: Oxalis
- Species: O. suksdorfii

Binomial name
- Oxalis suksdorfii Trel.

= Oxalis suksdorfii =

Species of flowering plant

Oxalis suksdorfii is a species of flowering plant in the woodsorrel family known by the common name western yellow woodsorrel and Suksdorf's woodsorrel. It is native to the western coast of the United States from Washington to northern California, where it can be found in open and wooded habitat types. It is a perennial herb growing erect or trailing, sometimes rooting at stolons, its stem reaching up to 25 centimeters in length. The leaves are each made up of three leaflets. The inflorescence is a solitary flower or cluster of up to three, each flower with five yellow petals up to 2 centimeters in length.
