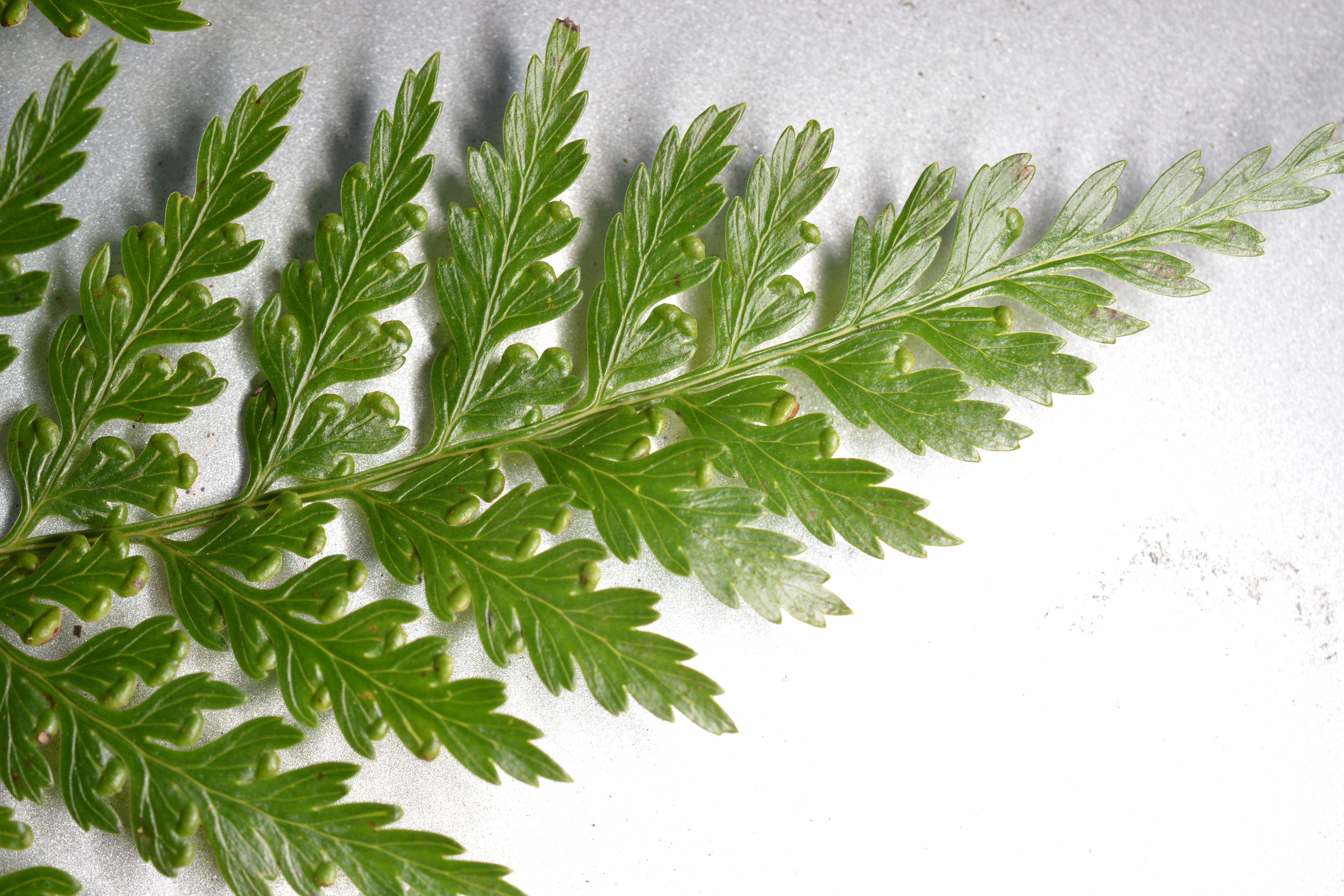
- Culcita macrocarpa

Scientific classification
- Kingdom: Plantae
- Clade: Tracheophytes
- Division: Polypodiophyta
- Class: Polypodiopsida
- Order: Cyatheales
- Family: Culcitaceae; Pic.Serm.
- Genus: Culcita; C.Presl

Type species
- Culcita macrocarpa C.Presl

Species
- C. coniifolia; C. macrocarpa

= Culcita (plant) =

Genus of ferns

Culcita is a genus of ferns, native to the Americas, Macaronesia and Iberian Peninsula. It is the only genus in the family Culcitaceae in the Pteridophyte Phylogeny Group classification of 2016 (PPG I). Alternatively, the family may be treated as the subfamily Culcitoideae of a very broadly defined family Cyatheaceae, the placement used for the genus in Plants of the World Online as of November 2019.

== Species ==
Only two species are known:

Image	Scientific name	Distribution
	Culcita coniifolia (Hook.) Maxon	Bolivia, Brazil South, Brazil Southeast, Colombia, Costa Rica, Cuba, Dominican Republic, Ecuador, El Salvador, Guatemala, Guyana, Honduras, Jamaica, Mexico, Nicaragua, Panamá, Peru, Venezuela
	Culcita macrocarpa C. Presl	Azores, Canary Islands, Madeira, Portugal, Spain
