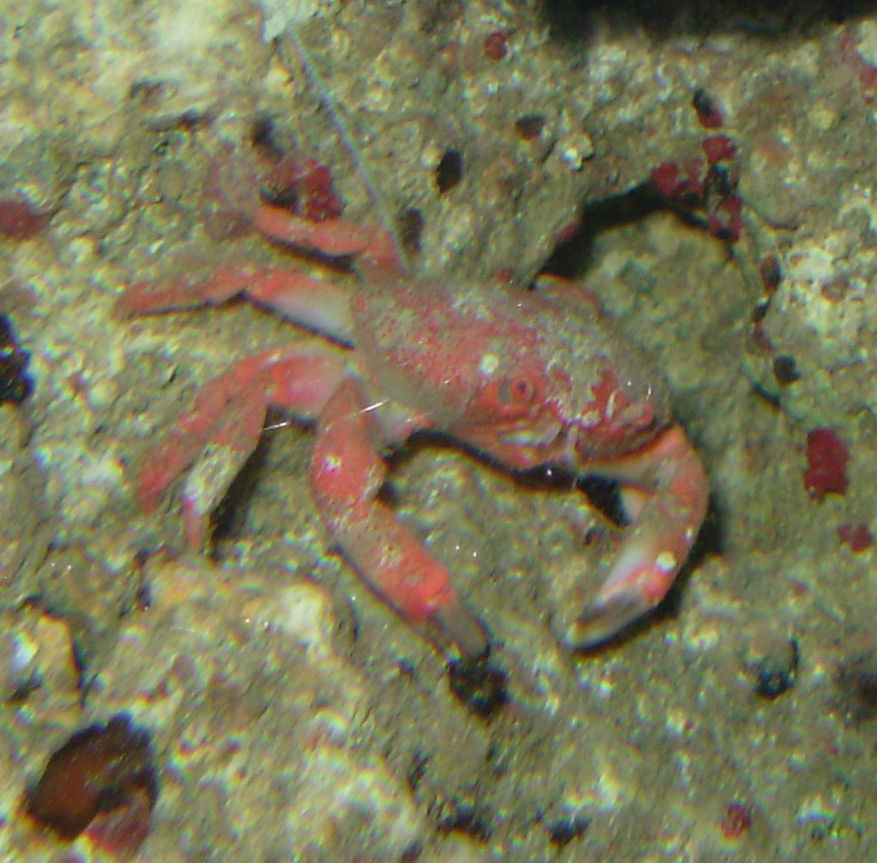

Scientific classification
- Kingdom: Animalia
- Phylum: Arthropoda
- Class: Malacostraca
- Order: Decapoda
- Suborder: Pleocyemata
- Infraorder: Brachyura
- Family: Xanthidae
- Genus: Neoliomera
- Species: N. pubescens

Binomial name
- Neoliomera pubescens (H. Milne-Edwards, 1834)

= Strawberry crab =

Species of crab

The strawberry crab (Neoliomera pubescens), also known as the Hawaiian strawberry crab or the red boxing crab, is a small, bright pink crab found in the Indo-Pacific region, including around Hawaii, French Polynesia, and Mauritius. It has small white bumps on the main shell and whitish claws. Adults reach about 5 centimetres (2 in) across.
