= Lysmata bahia =

Scientific classification
- Domain: Eukaryota
- Kingdom: Animalia
- Phylum: Arthropoda
- Class: Malacostraca
- Order: Decapoda
- Suborder: Pleocyemata
- Infraorder: Caridea
- Family: Lysmatidae
- Genus: Lysmata
- Species: L. bahia

Binomial name
- Lysmata bahia Rhyne & Lin, 2006

Species of crustacean

Lysmata bahia is a species of saltwater shrimp first classified as Lysmata wurdemanni. It is found in shallow waters of the Atlantic Ocean, and can be distinguished by its coloration pattern.
