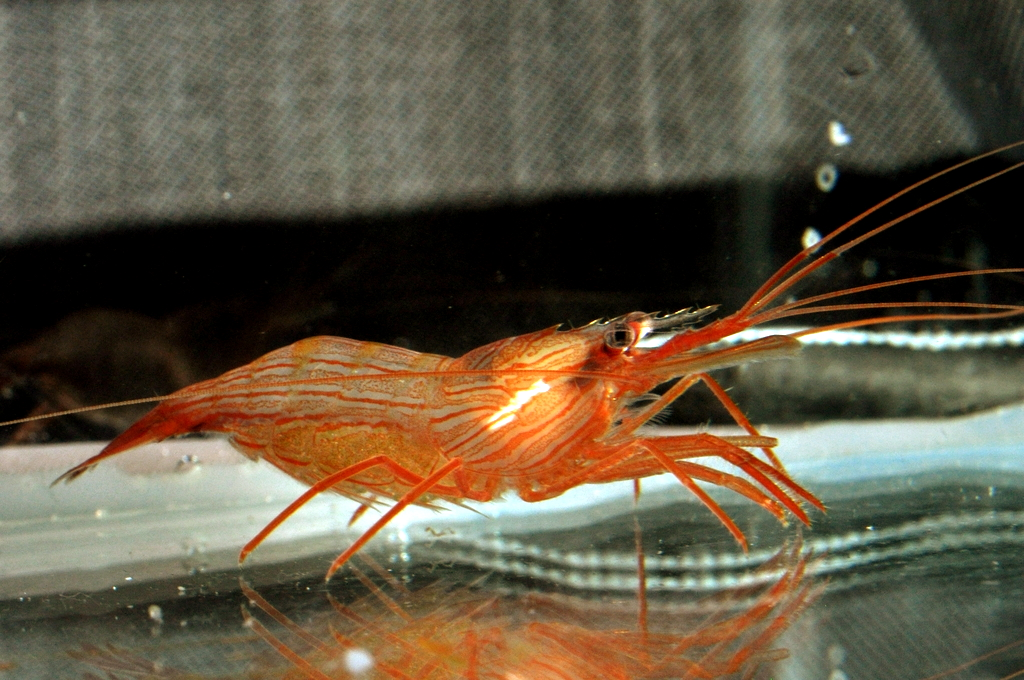

Scientific classification
- Domain: Eukaryota
- Kingdom: Animalia
- Phylum: Arthropoda
- Class: Malacostraca
- Order: Decapoda
- Suborder: Pleocyemata
- Infraorder: Caridea
- Family: Lysmatidae
- Genus: Lysmata
- Species: L. boggessi

Binomial name
- Lysmata boggessi Rhyne & Lin, 2006

= Lysmata boggessi =

Species of crustacean

Lysmata boggessi is a species of saltwater shrimp best known in the marine aquarium trade as the most reliable natural predator of Aiptasia anemones. It is commonly referred to by hobbyists as the "true peppermint shrimp", due to its consistent effectiveness and correct identification compared to similar-looking species. Native to shallow waters of the western Atlantic Ocean, it was originally classified as Lysmata wurdemanni but is now recognised as a separate species based on morphological and genetic distinctions.

L. boggessi is widely regarded by marine biologists and reef aquarists as the most consistent and effective species for controlling Aiptasia, an invasive pest in saltwater aquaria. Unlike other peppermint shrimp that are frequently misidentified or less effective, this species has been confirmed through both peer-reviewed research and widespread anecdotal use to actively consume Aiptasia in reef systems.
