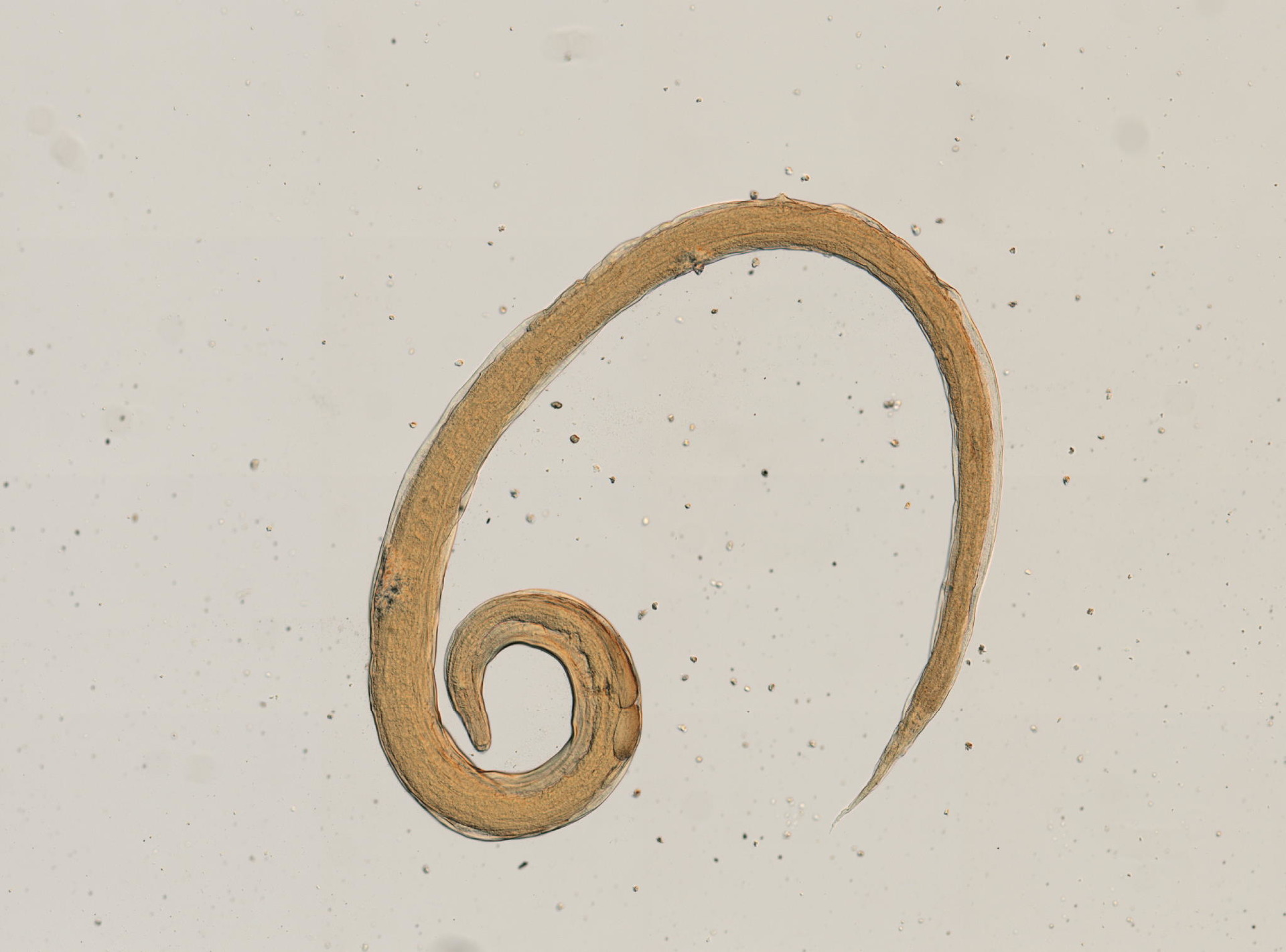
- Preserved specimen of Rhabdias ranea

Scientific classification
- Kingdom: Animalia
- Phylum: Nematoda
- Class: Chromadorea
- Order: Rhabditida
- Family: Rhabdiasidae

= Rhabdiasidae =

Family of nematodes

Rhabdiasidae is a family of nematodes belonging to the order Rhabditida.

== Genera ==
Genera:

- Acanthorhabdias Pereira, 1927
- Angiostoma Dujardin, 1845
- Chabirenia Lhermitte-Vallarino, Bain, Deharo, Bertani, Voza, Attout & Gaucher, 2005
