= P. pacificus =

P. pacificus may refer to:

- Pristionchus pacificus, a free-living nematode
- Polistes pacificus, a neotropical paper wasp
- Palaemon pacificus, a species of shrimp
- Parazen pacificus, an Atlantic zeiform fish
- Paraconcavus pacificus, an acorn barnacle
- Pelagihabitans pacificus a marine bacterium
- Philanthus pacificus, another species of New World wasp
- Profundiconus pacificus, a species of sea snail
- Peregocetus pacificus, an early form of whale discovered in Peru
- Paraletharchus pacificus, the sailfin eel
- Porribius pacificus, the New Zealand bat flea
