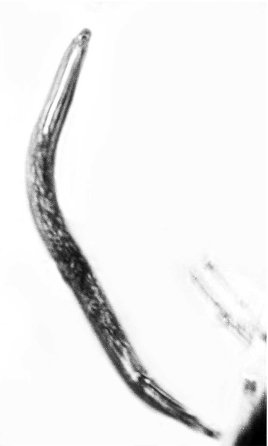
- Dauer juvenile

Scientific classification
- Domain: Eukaryota
- Kingdom: Animalia
- Phylum: Nematoda
- Class: Chromadorea
- Order: Rhabditida
- Family: Diplogastridae
- Genus: †Formicodiplogaster; Poinar, 2011
- Species: †F. myrmenema

Binomial name
- †Formicodiplogaster myrmenema Poinar, 2011

= Formicodiplogaster =

Formicodiplogaster Temporal range: Burdigalian

Extinct genus of roundworms

Formicodiplogaster is an extinct form genus of nematodes in the family Diplogasteridae which currently includes a single described species Formicodiplogaster myrmenema. The species is known from early Miocene fossils found on Hispaniola. F. myrmenema has been preserved in association with Azteca alpha, one of only two known fossil species in the ant genus Azteca.

== History and classification ==
When described Formicodiplogaster myrmenema was described from approximately seven fossil nematodes which were group inclusions with ants in transparent chunks of Dominican amber. The amber was produced by the extinct Hymenaea protera, which formerly grew on Hispaniola, across northern South America and up to southern Mexico. The specimens were collected from a number of amber mines in fossil bearing rocks of the Cordillera Septentrional mountains, northern Dominican Republic. The amber dates from at least the Burdigalian stage of the Miocene, based on studying the associated fossil foraminifera and may be as old as the Middle Eocene, based on the associated fossil coccoliths. This age range is due to the host rock being secondary deposits for the amber, and the Miocene the age range is the youngest that it might be.

At the time of description, the holotype dauer stage larva, in addition to the paratype larvae, adults and juveniles, were preserved in the Poinar amber collection at Oregon State University. The fossils were first studied by paleontologist George Poinar Jr. of Oregon State University, with his 2011 type description of the new genus and species being published in the journal Nematology monographs and perspectives pages. The generic epithet Formicodiplogaster is derived from the Latin formica, meaning "ant", and the nematode genus Diplogaster, while the specific epithet is a derivation of the Greek myrmex, meaning ant, and nema, meaning "thread".

Portions of ant nests have been fossilized and identified and show an association of the extinct ant Azteca alpha colonies and Formicodiplogaster myrmenema. The nests show active ant colonies in which adult and juvenile F myrmenema are present. Examples of phoretic F myrmenema are preserved as individuals in a dauer stage that was possibly carried in the abdominal intersegment membranes. The transition and transport of the dauer stage F myrmenema may have been a result of deteriorating conditions in the host colony. No direct evidence has been found for F. myrmenema living in the postpharyngeal glands or head glands of A. alpha.

== Description ==
Adult F myrmenema are 145–325 micrometres (0.0057–0.0128 inches) long with rounded heads and tails that come to a point and the lips of the mouth are not offset. Similarly the dauer stage juveniles are the same general shape, with rounded heads and tapered tails, ranging from 120–208 micrometres (0.0047–0.0082 inches) long.
