= Pristionchus maxplancki =

Scientific classification
- Domain: Eukaryota
- Kingdom: Animalia
- Phylum: Nematoda
- Class: Chromadorea
- Order: Rhabditida
- Family: Diplogastridae
- Genus: Pristionchus
- Species: P. maxplancki

Binomial name
- Pristionchus maxplancki Kanzaki, Ragsdale, Herrmann, Röseler & Sommer, 2013

Species of roundworm

Pristionchus maxplancki is a species of diplogastrid nematodes (roundworms).

== Description ==
Nematodes of P. maxplancki are small, with a body length of about 1 mm. It is associated with stag beetles (Lucanidae), from the body of which they were isolated. The species was discovered in an oak forest in Fukushima Prefecture (Tohoku region) on the island of Honshu. Like most species of Pristionchus, P. maxplancki has two forms that differ in their mouthparts: in the "stenostomatous" form, the mouth is elongated, narrow, and with one small tooth, whereas the "eurystomatous" has a mouth that is short, wide, and with two large teeth. This species is the closest known outgroup to a cryptic species complex that includes the model nematode P. pacificus and two other Pristionchus species. A scientific description of P. maxplancki was first published in August 2013 by nematologists from the Forestry and Forest Products Research Institute in Tsukuba, Ibaraki, Japan and the Max Planck Institute for Developmental Biology in Tübingen, Germany. The species was named after the German physicist and nobel laureate Max Planck (1858-1947). This is the first species named in his honor.
