= Parazen =

Parazen may refer to:

- Parazen, Iran, a village in Hormozgan Province, Iran
- Parazen (fish), a genus of fishes in the family Parazenidae
