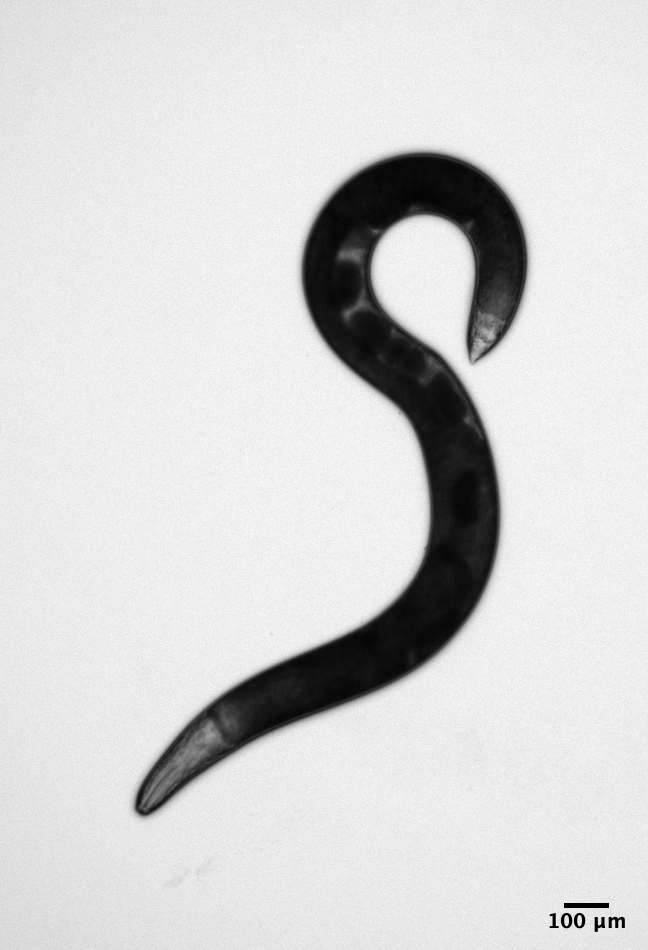
- Adult hermaphrodite

Scientific classification
- Domain: Eukaryota
- Kingdom: Animalia
- Phylum: Nematoda
- Class: Chromadorea
- Order: Rhabditida
- Family: Diplogastridae
- Genus: Allodiplogaster
- Species: A. sudhausi

Binomial name
- Allodiplogaster sudhausi (Von Lieven, 2008)

= Allodiplogaster sudhausi =

Species of roundworm

Allodiplogaster sudhausi is a free-living nematode species in the Diplogastridae family. It was described in 2008 as Koerneria sudhausi, before being moved to the genus Allodiplogaster in 2014. A. sudhausi is omnivorous. It predates on other nematodes, but can be cultured on Escherichia coli OP50 bacterium on agar.

== Mouth dimorphism ==
Like many other Diplogastridae, such as Pristionchus pacificus, A. sudhausi displays phenotypic plasticity, with a polyphenism in its adult mouth-form that leads to formation of one of two distinct stomas (mouth openings) of different dimensions. The two morphs that differ in stoma dimension are termed stenostomatous (narrow-mouthed) and eurystomatous (wide-mouthed).

== Cannibalism ==
A. sudhausi has displayed cannibalistic traits, with differences in behaviour observed between the stenostomatous and eurystomatous morphs.

== Biocontrol ==
A. sudhausi is a potential biological control agent. It has been shown to feed on juveniles and eggs of the plant-pathogenic root-knot nematode Meloidogyne javanica in vitro, and introducing A. sudhausi to M. javanica-inoculated soil also reduced tomato root galling.
