= List of Siphonaptera of New Zealand =

This is a list of all species of flea that are known to occur in New Zealand based on the New Zealand Organism Register. The list contains 27 species as of April 2025.

== Ceratophyllidae ==
- Ceratophyllus gallinae (Schrank, 1803)
- Nosopsyllus londiniensis (Rothschild, 1903)
- Nosopsyllus fasciatus (Bosc, 1800)

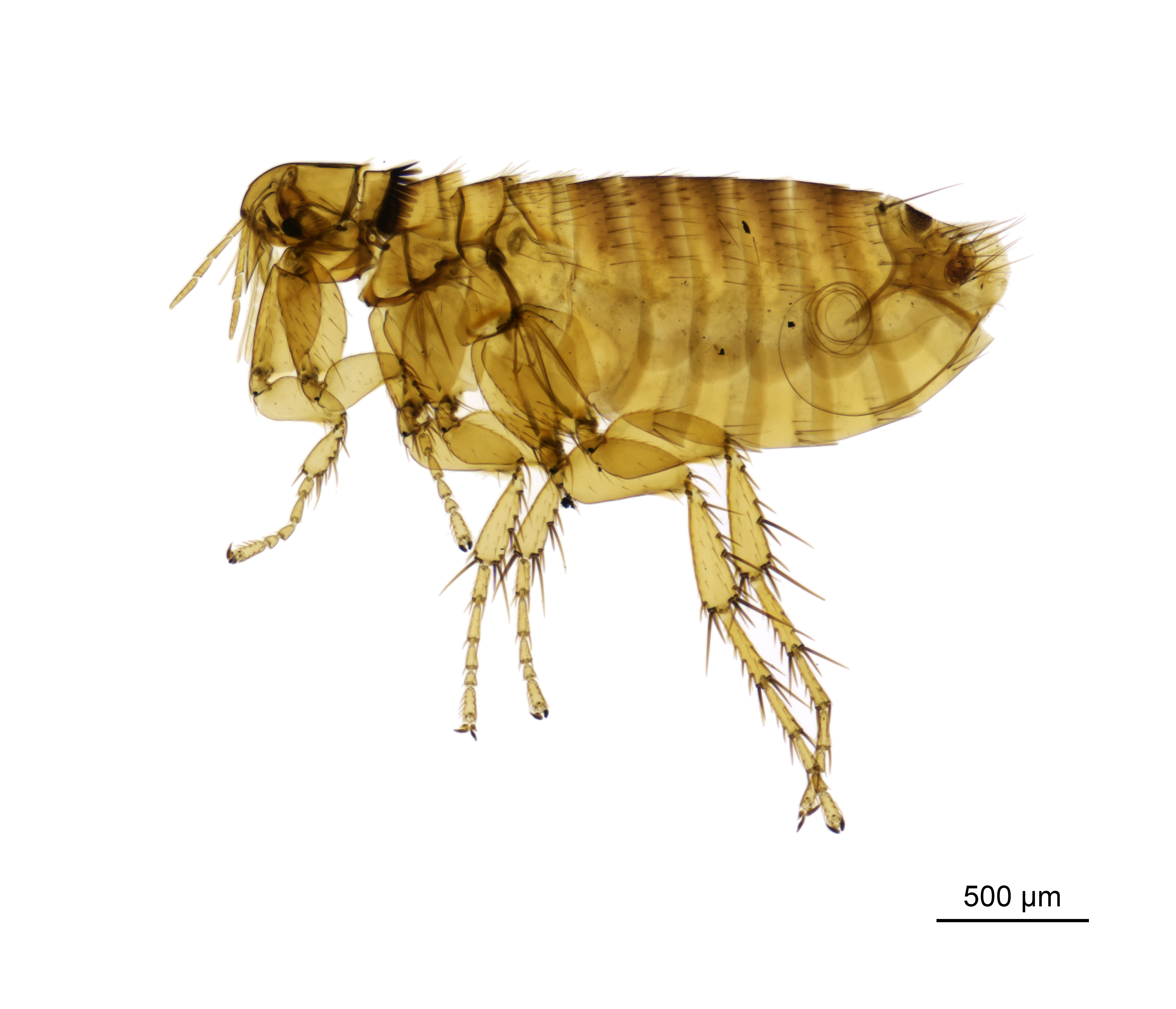
Nosopsyllus fasciatus

== Ischnopsyllidae ==
- Porribius pacificus Jordan, 1946

== Leptopsyllidae ==
- Leptopsylla segnis (Schonherr, 1811)

== Pulicidae ==
- Ctenocephalides canis (Curtis, 1826)
- Ctenocephalides felis (Bouche, 1835)
- Pulex irritans Linnaeus, 1758
- Xenopsylla cheopis (Rothschild, 1903)
- Xenopsylla vexabilis Jordan, 1925

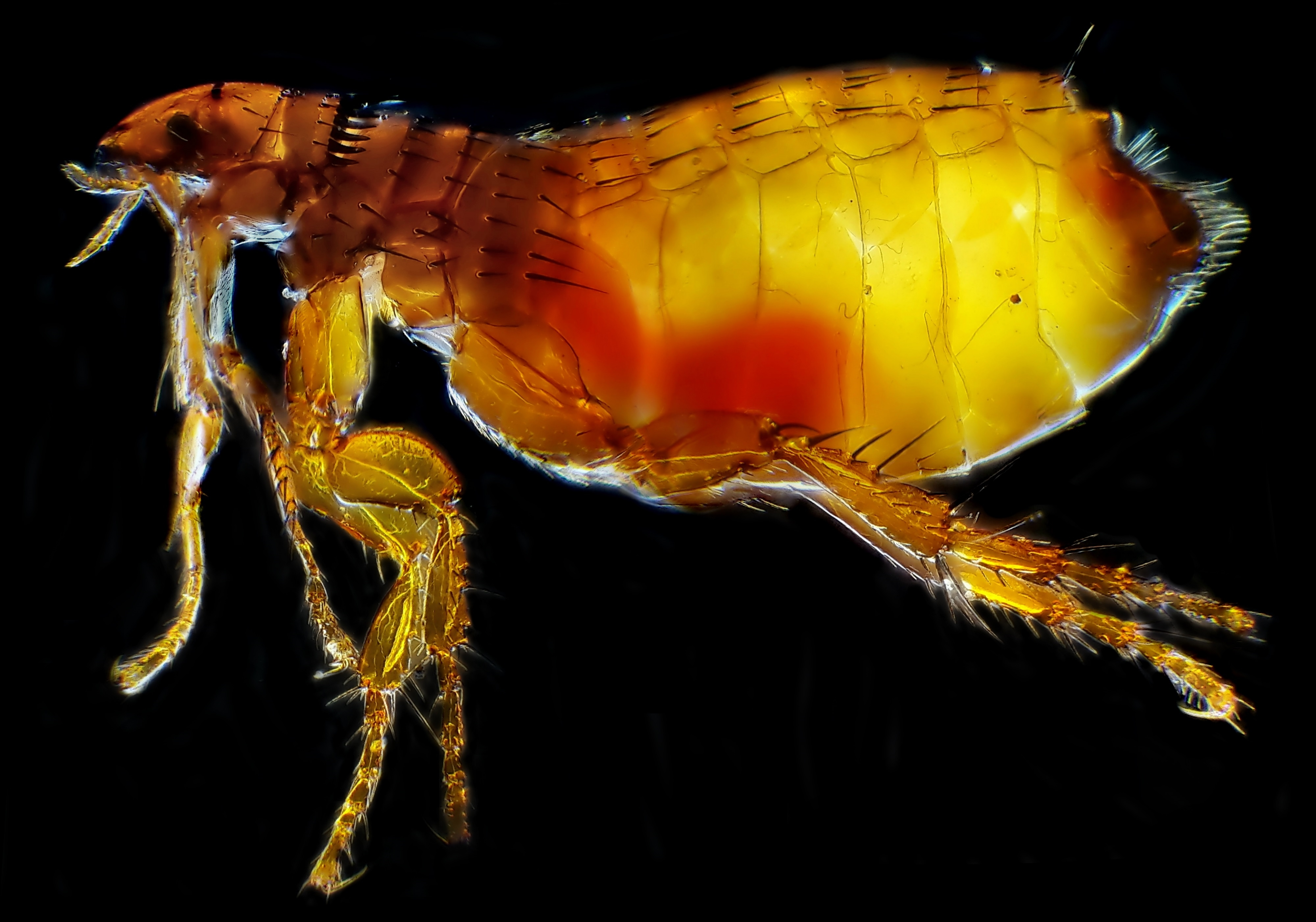
Ctenocephalides felis

== Pygiopsyllidae ==
- Hoogstraalia imberbis Smit, 1979
- Notiopsylla corynetes Smit, 1979
- Notiopsylla enciari Smit, 1957
- Notiopsylla kerguelensis (Taschenberg, 1800)
- Notiopsylla peregrinus Smit, 1979
- Pagipsylla galliralli (Smit, 1965)
- Pygiopsylla hoplia Jordan & Rothschild, 1922
- Pygiopsylla phiola Smit, 1979

== Rhopalopsyllidae ==
- Parapsyllus cardinis Dunnet, 1961
- Parapsyllus jacksoni Smit, 1965
- Parapsyllus longicornis (Enderlein, 1901)
- Parapsyllus lynnae Smit, 1965
- Parapsyllus magellanicus Jordan, 1938
- Parapsyllus mangarensis Smit, 1979
- Parapsyllus nestoris Smit, 1965
- Parapsyllus struthophilus Smit, 1979
- Parapsyllus valedictus Smit, 1979
