= Mononchoides fortidens =

Scientific classification
- Kingdom: Animalia
- Phylum: Nematoda
- Class: Chromadorea
- Order: Rhabditida
- Family: Diplogastridae
- Genus: Mononchoides
- Species: M. fortidens

Binomial name
- Mononchoides fortidens Schuurmans Stekhoven, 1951

Species of roundworm

Mononchoides fortidens, of the order Diplogasterida, is a free-living predacious nematode that feeds on both nematodes and bacteria. The predatory behavior of this nematode presents the opportunity to use it as a bio-control agent against other plant parasitic nematodes. It has been shown to have a preference for the second stage juveniles of Meloidogyne incognita.

== Distribution and morphology ==
M. fortidens may be found in decomposing organic manure. Morphological features include lips with setose papillae, large amphid apertures, and a mobile claw-like tooth. The female is diovarial and amphidelphic, while the male is without bursa and has nine pairs of genital papillae. The tails of both the male and female are filiform

== Predatory behavior ==
M. fortidens prefers small, slow moving prey. Once they’ve pierced the cuticle, they feed by cutting and sucking or swallowing their prey whole. They have also been shown to aggregate and feed from prey in groups. This positive aggregation response may be in part due to prey secretions/attractions that M. fortidens senses. Other factors affecting attraction include prey number, temperature, starvation, and distance between predator and prey. Bilgrami and Jairajpuri found that attraction to prey improved when prey number increased and when M. fortidens was starved for 12 days. Predation of Meloidogyne incognita by M. fortidens plateaued at temperatures between 30 and 35°C

== Bio-control applications ==
The use of predatory nematodes as a biological control agent for plant-parasitic nematodes was suggested by Cobb. M. fortidens is a reasonable choice for bio-control due to its short life cycle and easy culturability. M. fortidens was used in experiments investigating their potential as a bio-control for the root-knot nematode Meloidogyne arenaria in tomato. Khan and Kim found that the final population of M. arenaria decreased exponentially with increasing application densities of M. fortidens. When pots were treated with M. fortidens 7 days prior to planting, plant growth increased while root galling and final populations of M. arenaria decreased significantly
