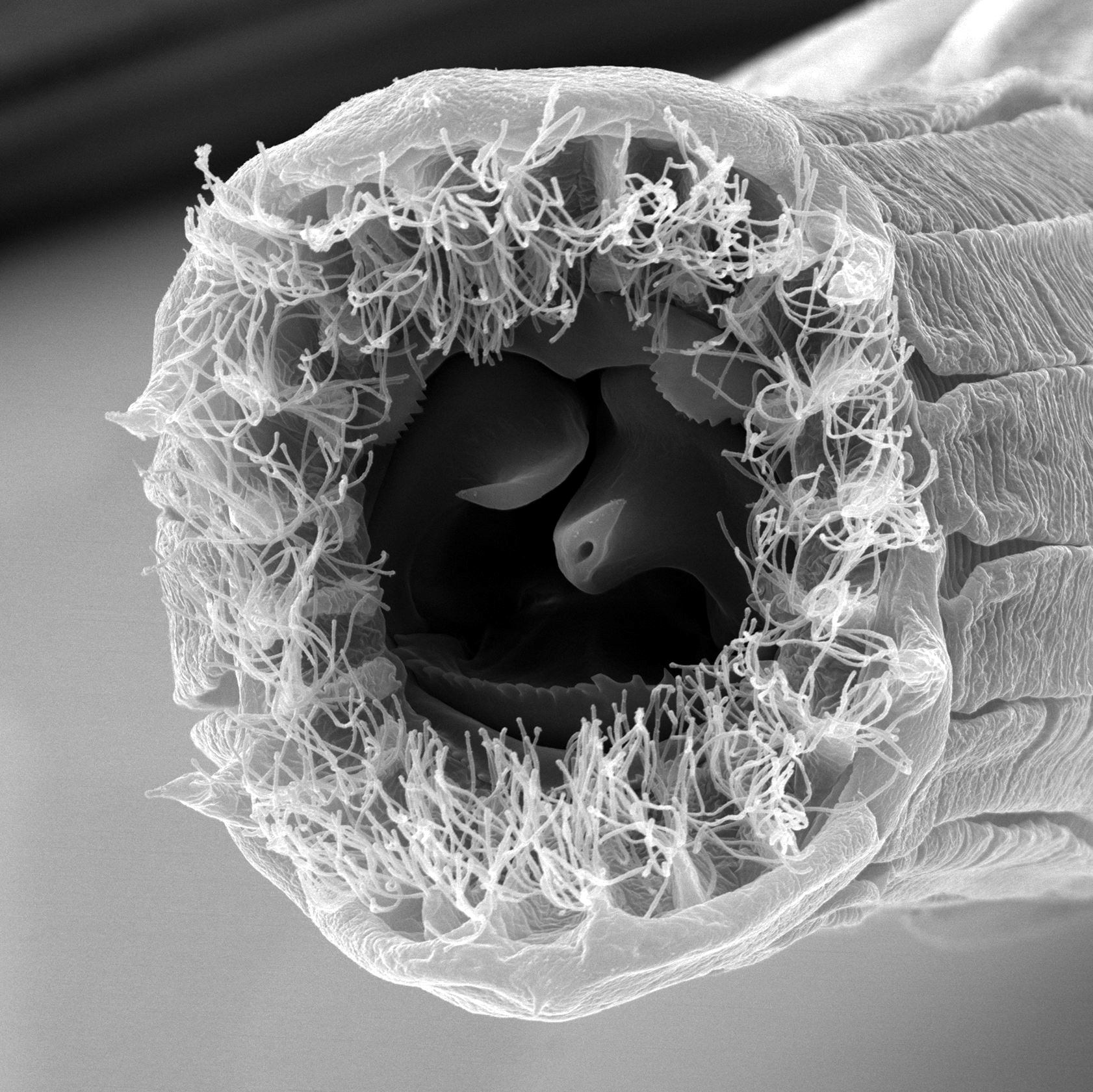
- Electron microscopy image of one of the five alternative morphs of P. borbonicus

Scientific classification
- Kingdom: Animalia
- Phylum: Nematoda
- Class: Chromadorea
- Order: Rhabditida
- Family: Diplogastridae
- Genus: Pristionchus
- Species: P. borbonicus

Binomial name
- Pristionchus borbonicus Susoy, Kanzaki, Herrmann, Ragsdale & Sommer, 2016

= Pristionchus borbonicus =

Species of roundworm

Pristionchus borbonicus is a species of free-living nematodes (roundworms) in the family Diplogastridae. The species was described from Réunion Island, and is notable for developing one of five different mouth forms depending on available food sources. Pristionchus borbonicus and related species have symbiotic relationships with fig plants and their pollinator wasps.
