= Sachsia zurstrasseni =

Scientific classification
- Kingdom: Animalia
- Phylum: Nematoda
- Class: Chromadorea
- Order: Rhabditida
- Family: Diplogastridae
- Genus: Sachsia
- Species: S. zurstrasseni

Binomial name
- Sachsia zurstrasseni (Sachs, 1950) Meyl, 1960

Synonyms
- Diplogaster zurstrasseni Sachs, 1950; Diplogasteriana zurstrasseni (Sachs, 1950) Andrássy, 1984; Diplogasteritus zurstrasseni (Sachs, 1950) Goodey, 1963

Species of nematodes

Sachsia zurstrasseni is a species of nematode in the Diplogastridae.
