= Pouch snake eel =

Scientific classification
- Domain: Eukaryota
- Kingdom: Animalia
- Phylum: Chordata
- Class: Actinopterygii
- Order: Anguilliformes
- Family: Ophichthidae
- Genus: Paraletharchus
- Species: P. opercularis

Binomial name
- Paraletharchus opercularis (Myers & Wade, 1941)

Synonyms
- Letharchus opercularis Myers & Wade, 1941

Species of fish

The Pouch snake eel (Paraletharchus opercularis) is an eel in the family Ophichthidae (worm/snake eels). It was described by George S. Myers and Charles Barkley Wade in 1941, originally under the genus Letharchus. It is a marine, tropical eel which is known from the eastern central and southeastern Pacific Ocean, including the Galapagos Islands, the Revillagigedo Islands, and the Cocos Islands. It is known to dwell at a maximum depth of 10 metres (33 ft), and inhabits sand sediments. Males can reach a maximum total length of 64.3 centimetres (25.3 in).

The IUCN redlist currently lists the pouch snake eel as vulnerable under Criterion D2, due to its limited range, and speculation that increasing frequency of ENSO events will have negative effects on the species' habitat.
