= Mononchoides composticola =

Scientific classification
- Domain: Eukaryota
- Kingdom: Animalia
- Phylum: Nematoda
- Class: Chromadorea
- Order: Rhabditida
- Family: Diplogastridae
- Genus: Mononchoides
- Species: M. composticola

Binomial name
- Mononchoides composticola Steel, Moens, Scholaert, Boshoff, Houthoofd & Bert 2011

Species of roundworm

Mononchoides is a quite common genus in the phylum of the Nematoda and by far the most diverse genus of the family of the Diplogasteridae. It has been described to live in various terrestrial habitats and is often associated with compost, dung, mud, other decaying materials and different kinds of beetles. Some have even been described from fresh water and marine habitats. In 2011, a new species has been described by Steel et al. This species was isolated from compost during the composting process and was named Mononchoides composticola.

== Habitat ==
=== Composting process ===
Mononchoides composticola became dominantly present in the studied compost heap. The composting process is typically subdivided into 3 different phases based on the temperature profile:

1. the thermophilic phase (45 °C - 75 °C)
2. the cooling phase (45 °C environmental temperature)
3. the maturation phase (≈ environmental temperature)

It is during the last two phases that Mononchoides composticola would become dominant in the compost heap.

=== Feeding habits ===
Mononchoides composticola has several preferences to what it consumes for food. It has the ability to actively move towards bacterial food resources such as Achromobacter species. It is also able to prey on other (compost)nematodes and demonstrates a higher predation rate on the relatively small and slow moving nematodes in the genus Rhabditella than on the larger though more motile Poikilolaimus species. This means that M. composticola has a dual feeding behavior and can alternate between bacterial and nematode prey.

== Characteristics ==
=== Morphometric data ===
All the measurements are expressed in μm.

=== Diagnosis ===
Mononchoides composticola is characterised by a combination of the following morphological features:

- a denticulate ridge in addition to the dorsal claw-like tooth
- a small tooth-like swelling at the stegostom base
- ca 26 longitudinal ridges on the female body
- a uterine sac associated with two dumb-bell-shaped pouches
- spicules that are relatively small (30-38 μm)
- a simple gubernaculum less than half the spicule length long
- the genital subventral papillae (v6) consisting of three very small papillae
- an especially long filiform tail

== Phylogenetic analysis ==
Mononchoides composticola is part of a clade that contains Mononchoides striatus, Tylopharynx foetida and Aduncospiculum halicti (grey box). The image below shows more detailed information about the phylogenetic tree of M. composticola
