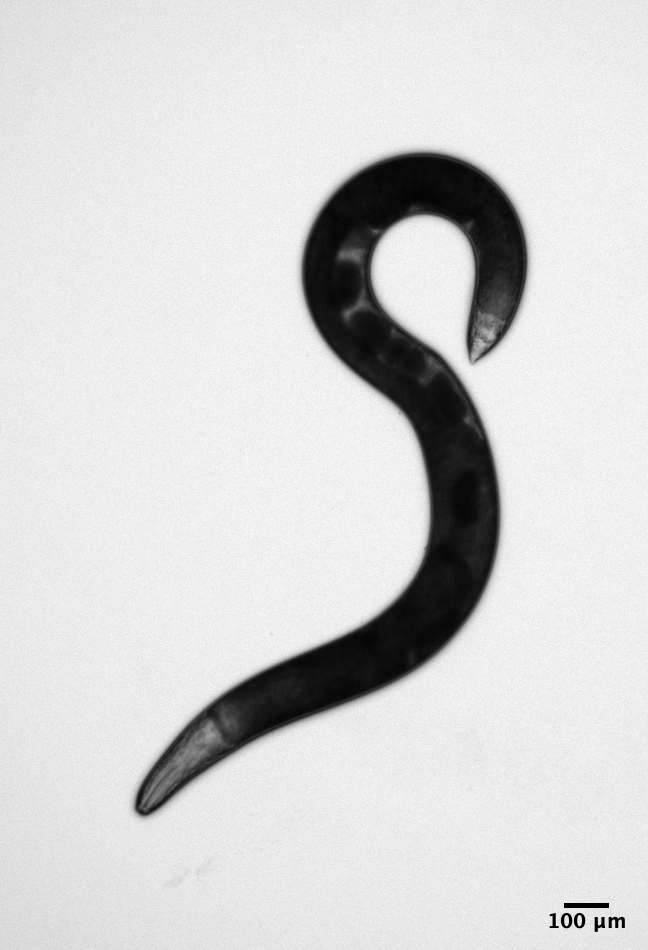
- Allodiplogaster sudhausi

Scientific classification
- Domain: Eukaryota
- Kingdom: Animalia
- Phylum: Nematoda
- Class: Chromadorea
- Order: Rhabditida
- Family: Diplogastridae
- Genus: Allodiplogaster; Paramonov & Sobolev in Skrjabin, Shikobalova, Sobolev, Paramonov & Sudarikov, 1954

= Allodiplogaster =

Genus of worms

Allodiplogaster is a genus of nematodes (roundworms) in the family Diplogastridae that currently includes about 35 described species.

== List of species ==
=== henrichae group ===
- Allodiplogaster henrichae
- Allodiplogaster colobocerca
- Allodiplogaster hirschmannae
- Allodiplogaster histophora
- Allodiplogaster hylobii
- Allodiplogaster incurva
- Allodiplogaster labiomorpha
- Allodiplogaster lepida
- Allodiplogaster lucani
- Allodiplogaster pierci
- Allodiplogaster pini
- Allodiplogaster robinicola
- Allodiplogaster sudhausi

=== striata group ===
- Allodiplogaster angarensis
- Allodiplogaster aquatica
- Allodiplogaster baicalensis
- Allodiplogaster carinata
- Allodiplogaster didentata
- Allodiplogaster filicaudata
- Allodiplogaster ivanegae
- Allodiplogaster lupata
- Allodiplogaster mordax
- Allodiplogaster mulveyi
- Allodiplogaster pantolaba
- Allodiplogaster pararmata
- Allodiplogaster regia
- Allodiplogaster ruricula
- Allodiplogaster sphagni
- Allodiplogaster strenua
- Allodiplogaster striata
- Allodiplogaster tenuipunctata
- Allodiplogaster terranova
