= Heteropleuronema =

Scientific classification
- Domain: Eukaryota
- Kingdom: Animalia
- Phylum: Nematoda
- Class: Chromadorea
- Order: Rhabditida
- Family: Diplogastridae
- Genus: Heteropleuronema
- Species: H. unum

Binomial name
- Heteropleuronema unum Andrassy, 1970

Species of roundworm

Heteropleuronema is a monotypic genus of nematodes in the family Diplogastridae. The only species described so far is Heteropleuronema unum. It has been isolated from fungi in Vietnam.
