= Longibucca =

Scientific classification
- Domain: Eukaryota
- Kingdom: Animalia
- Phylum: Nematoda
- Class: Chromadorea
- Order: Rhabditida
- Family: Diplogastridae
- Genus: Longibucca; Chitwood, 1933

Genus of roundworms

Longibucca is a genus of nematodes belonging to the family Diplogastridae.

The species of this genus are found in Northern America.

Species:

- Longibucca catesbeianae de Souza Junior, de Toledo Artigas & Laterca Martins, 1994
- Longibucca lasiura McIntosh & Chitwood, 1934
- Longibucca vivipara Chitwood, 1933
