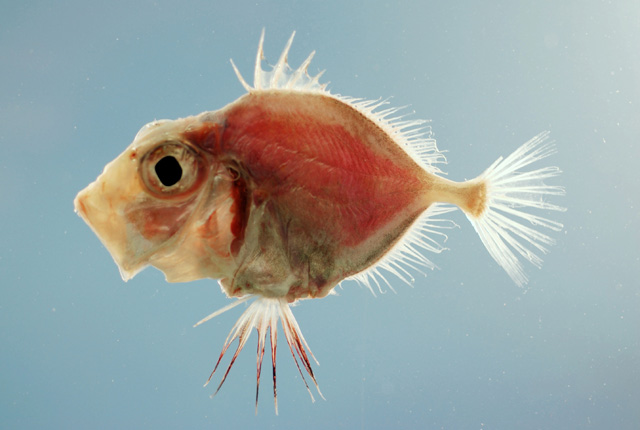
- Rosy dory (Cyttopsis rosea)

Scientific classification
- Kingdom: Animalia
- Phylum: Chordata
- Class: Actinopterygii
- Order: Zeiformes
- Family: Parazenidae; Greenwood, Rosen, S. H. Weitzman & G. S. Myers, 1966

Subfamilies and genera
- Subfamily Cyttopsinae; Cyttopsis; Stethopristes; Subfamily Parazeninae; Parazen

= Parazenidae =

Family of fishes

Parazenidae is a family of zeiform fishes found in the Atlantic and Pacific Oceans.
