= Azteca delpini =

Scientific classification
- Kingdom: Animalia
- Phylum: Arthropoda
- Class: Insecta
- Order: Hymenoptera
- Family: Formicidae
- Subfamily: Dolichoderinae
- Genus: Azteca
- Species: A. delpini

Binomial name
- Azteca delpini Emery, 1893

Subspecies
- Azteca delpini antillana Forel, 1899; Azteca delpini trinidadensis Forel, 1899

Species of ant

Azteca delpini is a species of ant in the genus Azteca. Described by Emery in 1893, the species is endemic to South America.
