= Azteca cordincola =

Scientific classification
- Kingdom: Animalia
- Phylum: Arthropoda
- Class: Insecta
- Order: Hymenoptera
- Family: Formicidae
- Subfamily: Dolichoderinae
- Genus: Azteca
- Species: A. cordincola

Binomial name
- Azteca cordincola Forel, 1921

Species of ant

Azteca cordincola is a species of ant in the genus Azteca. Described by Forel in 1921, the species is endemic to Bolivia.
