= American sailfin eel =

Conservation status
- Least Concern (IUCN 3.1)

Scientific classification
- Kingdom: Animalia
- Phylum: Chordata
- Class: Actinopterygii
- Order: Anguilliformes
- Family: Ophichthidae
- Genus: Letharchus
- Species: L. velifer

Binomial name
- Letharchus velifer Goode & T. H. Bean, 1882

Species of fish

The American sailfin eel (Letharchus velifer, also known as the sailfin eel) is an eel in the family Ophichthidae (worm/snake eels). It was described by George Brown Goode and Tarleton Hoffman Bean in 1882. It is a subtropical, marine eel which is known from the western Atlantic Ocean, including the United States (North Carolina and northeastern Florida) and the northeastern Gulf of Mexico. It frequently inhabits scallop grounds. Males can reach a maximum total length of 51 centimeters.
