= Azteca aesopus =

Scientific classification
- Kingdom: Animalia
- Phylum: Arthropoda
- Class: Insecta
- Order: Hymenoptera
- Family: Formicidae
- Subfamily: Dolichoderinae
- Genus: Azteca
- Species: A. aesopus

Binomial name
- Azteca aesopus Forel, 1908

Species of ant

Azteca aesopus is a species of ant in the genus Azteca. Described by Auguste-Henri Forel in 1908, the species is endemic to Brazil.
