= Sailfin eel =

Scientific classification
- Kingdom: Animalia
- Phylum: Chordata
- Class: Actinopterygii
- Order: Anguilliformes
- Family: Ophichthidae
- Genus: Paraletharchus
- Species: P. pacificus

Binomial name
- Paraletharchus pacificus (Osburn & Nichols, 1916)

Synonyms
- Letharchus pacificus Osburn & Nichols, 1916

Species of fish

The Sailfin eel (Paraletharchus pacificus, also known commonly as the Pacific sailfin eel in Mexico) is an eel in the family Ophichthidae (worm/snake eels). It was described by Raymond Carroll Osburn and John Treadwell Nichols in 1916, originally under the genus Letharchus. It is a marine, tropical eel which is known from the eastern central Pacific Ocean (from which its species epithet is derived), including Costa Rica, Mexico, and Panama. It is known to dwell at a depth of 35 metres (115 ft), and inhabits rock and sand sediments. Males can reach a maximum total length of 81 centimetres (32 in).

Due to its wide distribution, lack of known threats, and lack of observed population decline, the IUCN redlist currently lists the Sailfin eel as Least Concern.
