= Azteca beltii =

Scientific classification
- Kingdom: Animalia
- Phylum: Arthropoda
- Class: Insecta
- Order: Hymenoptera
- Family: Formicidae
- Subfamily: Dolichoderinae
- Genus: Azteca
- Species: A. beltii

Binomial name
- Azteca beltii Emery, 1893

Synonyms
- Azteca fasciata laeta Wheeler, W.M., 1942; Azteca stolli Forel, 1912

Species of ant

Azteca beltii is a species of ant in the genus Azteca. Described by Carlo Emery in 1893, the species is endemic to North America and South America.
