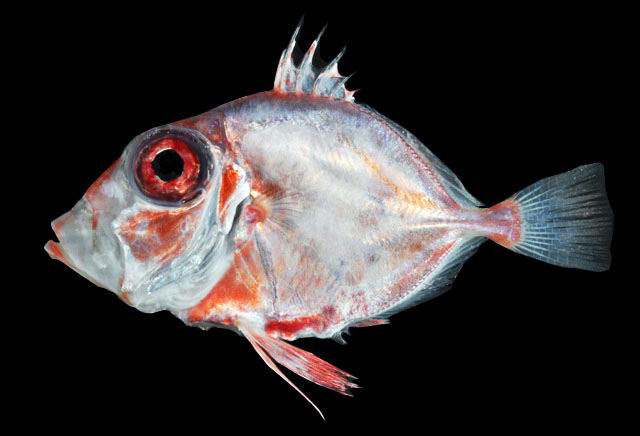

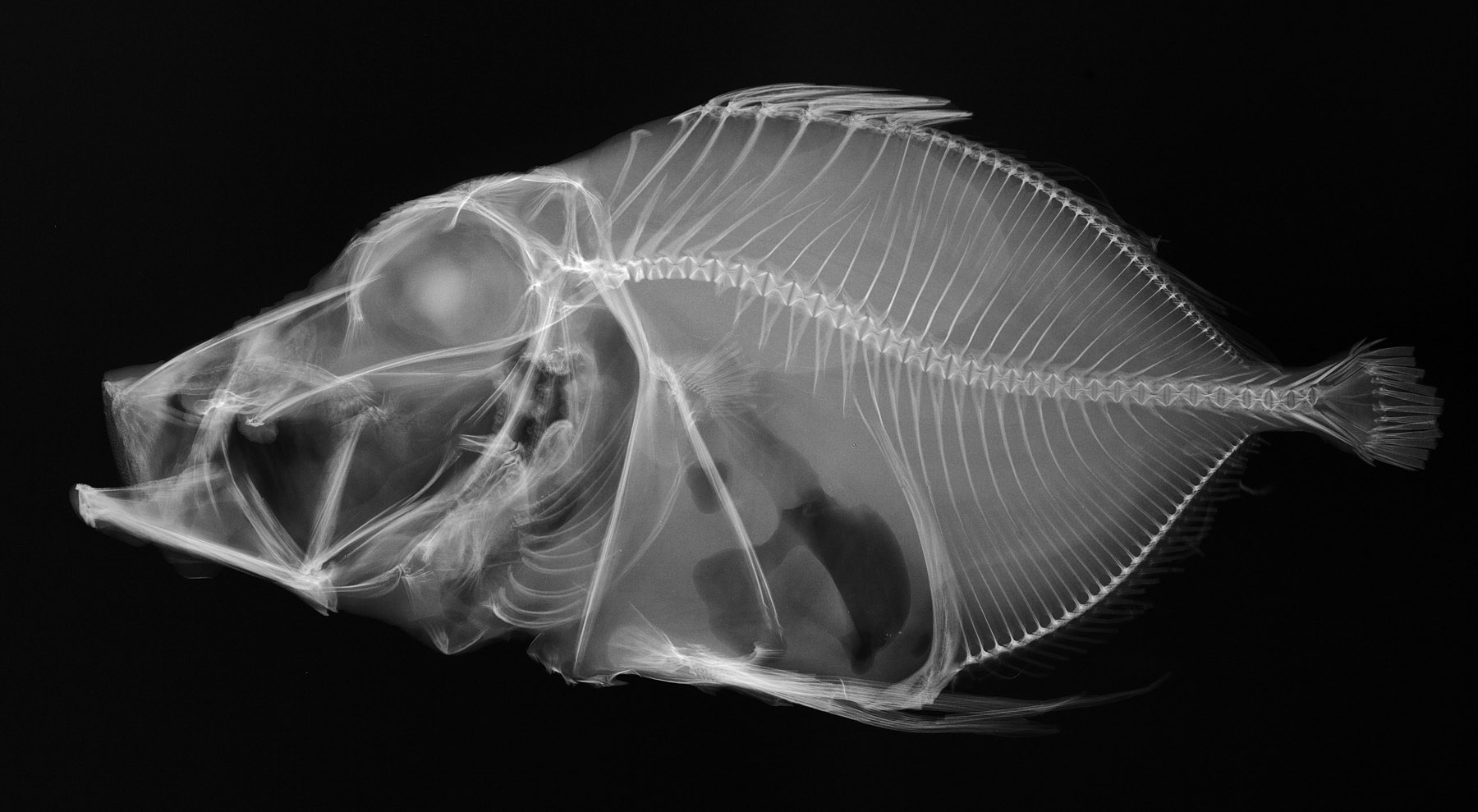
- Cyttopsis rosea, conventional and X-ray images

Conservation status
- Least Concern (IUCN 3.1)

Scientific classification
- Kingdom: Animalia
- Phylum: Chordata
- Class: Actinopterygii
- Order: Zeiformes
- Family: Parazenidae
- Genus: Cyttopsis
- Species: C. rosea

Binomial name
- Cyttopsis rosea (R. T. Lowe, 1843)

Synonyms
- Cyttopsis itea; Paracyttopsis scutatus; Zeus roseus

= Cyttopsis rosea =

Species of fish

Cyttopsis rosea, the rosy dory, is a zeiform fish which is found on the continental slopes in most parts of the Atlantic and Pacific Oceans. It growth up to 22 cm and feeds on other fishes and on swimming crustaceans. It is often caught as bycatch in deep trawl fisheries, but is not utilized.
