= Levipalatum =

Scientific classification
- Domain: Eukaryota
- Kingdom: Animalia
- Phylum: Nematoda
- Class: Chromadorea
- Order: Rhabditida
- Family: Diplogastridae
- Genus: Levipalatum; Ragsdale, Kanzaki & Sommer, 2014
- Species: L. texanum

Binomial name
- Levipalatum texanum Ragsdale, Kanzaki & Sommer, 2014

Species of roundworm

Levipalatum is a genus of free-living nematodes (roundworms) in the family Diplogastridae, containing the single species Levipalatum texanum. The species is androdioecious, consisting of self-fertile hermaphrodites which are morphologically females, and males. It is known from the south-eastern United States and has been found to live in association with scarab beetles (Cyclocephala sp.), although it has also been baited from soil. Nematodes of this species can be cultured on bacterium Escherichia coli in the laboratory, and they are presumed to also feed on microorganisms in the wild. Levipalatum is a monotypic genus.
