= Azteca chartifex =

Scientific classification
- Kingdom: Animalia
- Phylum: Arthropoda
- Class: Insecta
- Order: Hymenoptera
- Family: Formicidae
- Subfamily: Dolichoderinae
- Genus: Azteca
- Species: A. chartifex

Binomial name
- Azteca chartifex Forel, 1896

Subspecies
- Azteca chartifex cearensis Forel, 1903; Azteca chartifex decipiens Forel, 1906; Azteca chartifex lanians Emery, 1913; Azteca chartifex multinida Forel, 1899; Azteca chartifex spiriti Forel, 1912; Azteca chartifex stalactitica Emery, 1896

Synonyms
- Azteca chartifex laticeps Forel, 1899

Species of ant

Azteca chartifex is a species of ant in the genus Azteca. Described by Forel in 1896, the species is endemic to various countries in North America and South America.
