= Micoletzkya =

Scientific classification
- Kingdom: Animalia
- Phylum: Nematoda
- Class: Chromadorea
- Order: Rhabditida
- Family: Diplogastridae
- Genus: Micoletzkya; Weingärtner 1955

Genus of roundworms

Micoletzkya is a genus of predatory bark-beetle-associated nematodes in the family Diplogastridae. The genus was named for the Austrian nematologist Heinrich Micoletzky. As of 2013 it consists of 25 described species.

== Ecology and life history ==
Nematodes of Micoletzkya live in symbiosis with bark beetles. The hosts include economically important species across North America and Europe such as the mountain pine beetle Dendroctonus ponderosae and European spruce bark beetle Ips typographus. The life history of the nematodes is closely linked to that of their hosts. Infective (dauer) larvae of Micoletzkya attach themselves onto the body surface of a beetle for transmission and resume their development in host breeding galleries. In the bark beetle galleries, nematodes go through a few free-living generations, presumably feeding on beetle-associated microorganisms and other nematodes, after which dauer larvae develop and attach to newly emerging bark beetles for transmission.

== Host specificity and speciation ==
Micoletzkya nematodes are remarkably host specific, with most species found in association with only a single host species. Nematodes of this genus are vertically transmitted within host populations, which fosters cospeciation with bark beetles and adaptation to particular groups of hosts. Phylogenetic evidence suggests that diversification of the genus was largely influenced by the evolutionary radiation of bark beetles.

== Mouth dimorphism ==
Like many other members of the diplogastrid family, Micoletzkya nematodes have movable opposing teeth and show a mouth dimorphism. Dimorphic species of the genus can express two alternative mouth phenotypes: stenostomatous (narrow mouth and small teeth) and eurystomatous (wide mouth and large teeth). The two alternative phenotypes are thought to represent a resource polyphenism, or specialized for feeding on different foods, such as microorganisms and other nematodes respectively.

== Isolation and culturing ==
Micoletzkya adults and larvae can be found in breeding galleries of bark beetles; dauer juveniles of the nematodes can be isolated from dispersing beetles. Many Micoletzkya species are cultured using bacteria; some species can be cultured using C. elegans and other nematodes as food. At 23 °C, the generation time of Micoletzkya is about 10 days.
