= Azteca brevis =

Scientific classification
- Kingdom: Animalia
- Phylum: Arthropoda
- Class: Insecta
- Order: Hymenoptera
- Family: Formicidae
- Subfamily: Dolichoderinae
- Genus: Azteca
- Species: A. brevis

Binomial name
- Azteca brevis Forel, 1899

Species of ant

Azteca brevis is a species of ant in the genus Azteca. Described by Auguste-Henri Forel in 1899, the species is endemic to Costa Rica and Nicaragua.
