= Mononchoides =

Scientific classification
- Domain: Eukaryota
- Kingdom: Animalia
- Phylum: Nematoda
- Class: Chromadorea
- Order: Rhabditida
- Family: Diplogastridae
- Genus: Mononchoides; Rahm, 1928

Genus of roundworms

Mononchoides is a genus of nematodes belonging to the family Diplogastridae.

The genus has almost cosmopolitan distribution.

Species:

- Mononchoides adjunctus Massey, 1966
- Mononchoides albus (Bastian, 1865) Sudhaus & Fürst von Lieven, 2003
- Mononchoides americanus (Steiner, 1930) Chitwood, 1937
- Mononchoides andersoni Ebsary, 1986
- Mononchoides andrassyi (Timm, 1961) Gagarin, 1998
- Mononchoides aphodii (Bovien, 1937) Sudhaus & Fürst von Lieven, 2003
- Mononchoides armatus (Hofmänner, 1913) Gagarin, 1998
- Mononchoides asiaticus Gagarin, 2001
- Mononchoides bicornis (Rahm, 1928) Andrássy, 1984
- Mononchoides bollingeri Goodrich, Hechler & Taylor, 1968
- Mononchoides changi Goodrich, Hechler & Taylor, 1968
- Mononchoides composticola Steel, Moens, Scholaert, Boshoff, Houthoofd & Bert, 2011
- Mononchoides elegans (Weingärtner, 1955) Goodey, 1963
- Mononchoides filicaudatus (Allgén, 1947) Sudhaus & Fürst von Lieven, 2003
- Mononchoides flagellicaudatus (Andrássy, 1962) Zullini, 1981
- Mononchoides fortidens (Schuurmans Stekhoven, 1951) Taylor & Hechler, 1966
- Mononchoides gracilis Dassonville & Heyns, 1984
- Mononchoides intermedius Gagarin, 1993
- Mononchoides iranicus Atighi, Pourjan, Kanzaki, Giblin-Davis, De Ley, Mundo-Ocampo & Pedram, 2013
- Mononchoides isolae (Meyl, 1953) Goodey, 1963
- Mononchoides leptospiculum (Weingärtner, 1955) Goodey, 1963
- Mononchoides linocercus (Völk, 1950) Andrássy, 1984
- Mononchoides longicauda Rahm, 1928
- Mononchoides longicaudatus (Khera, 1965) Andrássy, 1984
- Mononchoides macrospiculum Troccoli, Oreste, Tarasco, Fanelli & De Luca, 2015
- Mononchoides microstomus Gagarin, 1998
- Mononchoides paesleri (Gunhold, 1952) Sudhaus & Fürst von Lieven, 2003
- Mononchoides paramonovi Gagarin, 1998
- Mononchoides parastriatus (Paesler, 1946) Andrássy, 1984
- Mononchoides piracicabensis (Rahm, 1928) Goodey, 1964
- Mononchoides pulcher Zullini, 1981
- Mononchoides pulcherrimus Andrássy, 1987
- Mononchoides pylophilus (Weingärtner, 1955) Goodey, 1963
- Mononchoides rahmi (Goodey, 1951) Sudhaus & Fürst von Lieven, 2003
- Mononchoides rhabdoderma (Völk, 1950) Calaway & Tarjan, 1973
- Mononchoides ruffoi Zullini, 1981
- Mononchoides schwemmlei (Sachs, 1950) Gagarin, 1998
- Mononchoides splendidus (Körner, 1954) Goodey, 1963
- Mononchoides striatulus (Fuchs, 1933) Goodey, 1963
- Mononchoides striatus (Bütschli, 1876) Goodey, 1963
- Mononchoides subamericanus (van der Linde, 1938) Calaway & Tarjan, 1973
- Mononchoides subdentatus (Gunhold, 1952) Andrássy, 1984
- Mononchoides trichiuroides (W.Schneider, 1937) Goodey, 1963
- Mononchoides trichuris (Cobb, 1893) Goodey, 1963
- Mononchoides vulgaris Gagarin, 2000
