= Azteca christopherseni =

Scientific classification
- Kingdom: Animalia
- Phylum: Arthropoda
- Class: Insecta
- Order: Hymenoptera
- Family: Formicidae
- Subfamily: Dolichoderinae
- Genus: Azteca
- Species: A. christopherseni

Binomial name
- Azteca christopherseni Forel, 1912

Species of insect

Azteca christopherseni is a species of ant in the genus Azteca. Described by Forel in 1912, the species is endemic to Panama.
