= Azteca angusticeps =

Scientific classification
- Kingdom: Animalia
- Phylum: Arthropoda
- Class: Insecta
- Order: Hymenoptera
- Family: Formicidae
- Subfamily: Dolichoderinae
- Genus: Azteca
- Species: A. angusticeps

Binomial name
- Azteca angusticeps Emery, 1893

Species of insect

Azteca angusticeps is a species of ant in the genus Azteca. Described by Carlo Emery in 1893, the species is widespread in North America and South America.
