= Azteca eumeces =

Azteca eumeces Temporal range: Burdigalian

Scientific classification
- Kingdom: Animalia
- Phylum: Arthropoda
- Clade: Pancrustacea
- Class: Insecta
- Order: Hymenoptera
- Family: Formicidae
- Subfamily: Dolichoderinae
- Genus: Azteca
- Species: †A. eumeces

Binomial name
- †Azteca eumeces Wilson, 1985

Species of ant

Azteca eumeces is an extinct species of ant in the subfamily Dolichoderinae known from possibly Miocene fossils found on Hispaniola. A. eumeces is one of only two species in the ant genus Azteca to have been described from fossils, both found in Dominican amber.

== History and classification ==
When described Azteca eumeces was known from approximately thirty nine fossil insects which are solitary or group inclusions in transparent chunks of Dominican amber. The amber was produced by the extinct Hymenaea protera, which formerly grew on Hispaniola and across northern South America up to southern Mexico. The holotype specimen was collected from Palo Quemado, near Santiago, while the other six amber specimens are from unidentified amber mines in fossil-bearing rocks of the Cordillera Septentrional mountains, northern Dominican Republic. The amber dates from at least the Burdigalian stage of the Miocene, based on studies of the associated fossil foraminifera and may be as old as the Middle Eocene, based on the associated fossil coccoliths. This age range is due to the host rock being a secondary deposit for the amber, and the Miocene the age range is only the youngest that it might be.

At the time of description, the holotype worker and the paratype worker, male and queen specimens were preserved in the Museum of Comparative Zoology amber collections. The fossils were first studied by entomologist Edward O. Wilson of the Harvard University with his 1985 type description of the new species being published in the journal Psyche. The specific epithet eumeces, derived from the Greek eumekes, meaning "of good length". A. eumeces is one of two Azteca species described by Wilson from Dominican amber, the other species, A. alpha is one of the most numerous ant fossils in the amber.

== Description ==
Azteca eumeces has a suite traits that match modern species in the alfari group. A. alpha is separated from the other species in the group by the elongated shape of the head capsules. The species has an overall look that is similar to the living species A. bicolor, A. fasciata and A. theresiae. Those three species and the coeval species A. alpha are distinguished from A. eumeces in that all have workers with shorter head capsules.
