= Azteca australis =

Scientific classification
- Kingdom: Animalia
- Phylum: Arthropoda
- Class: Insecta
- Order: Hymenoptera
- Family: Formicidae
- Subfamily: Dolichoderinae
- Genus: Azteca
- Species: A. australis

Binomial name
- Azteca australis Wheeler, W.M., 1942

Species of ant

Azteca australis is a species of ant in the genus Azteca. Described by Wheeler in 1942, the species is endemic to various countries in South America.
