= Azteca aurita =

Scientific classification
- Kingdom: Animalia
- Phylum: Arthropoda
- Class: Insecta
- Order: Hymenoptera
- Family: Formicidae
- Subfamily: Dolichoderinae
- Genus: Azteca
- Species: A. aurita

Binomial name
- Azteca aurita Emery, 1893

Synonyms
- Azteca lacrymosa silvae Forel, 1899

Species of ant

Azteca aurita is a species of ant in the genus Azteca. Described by Emery in 1893, the species is widespread in North America and South America.
