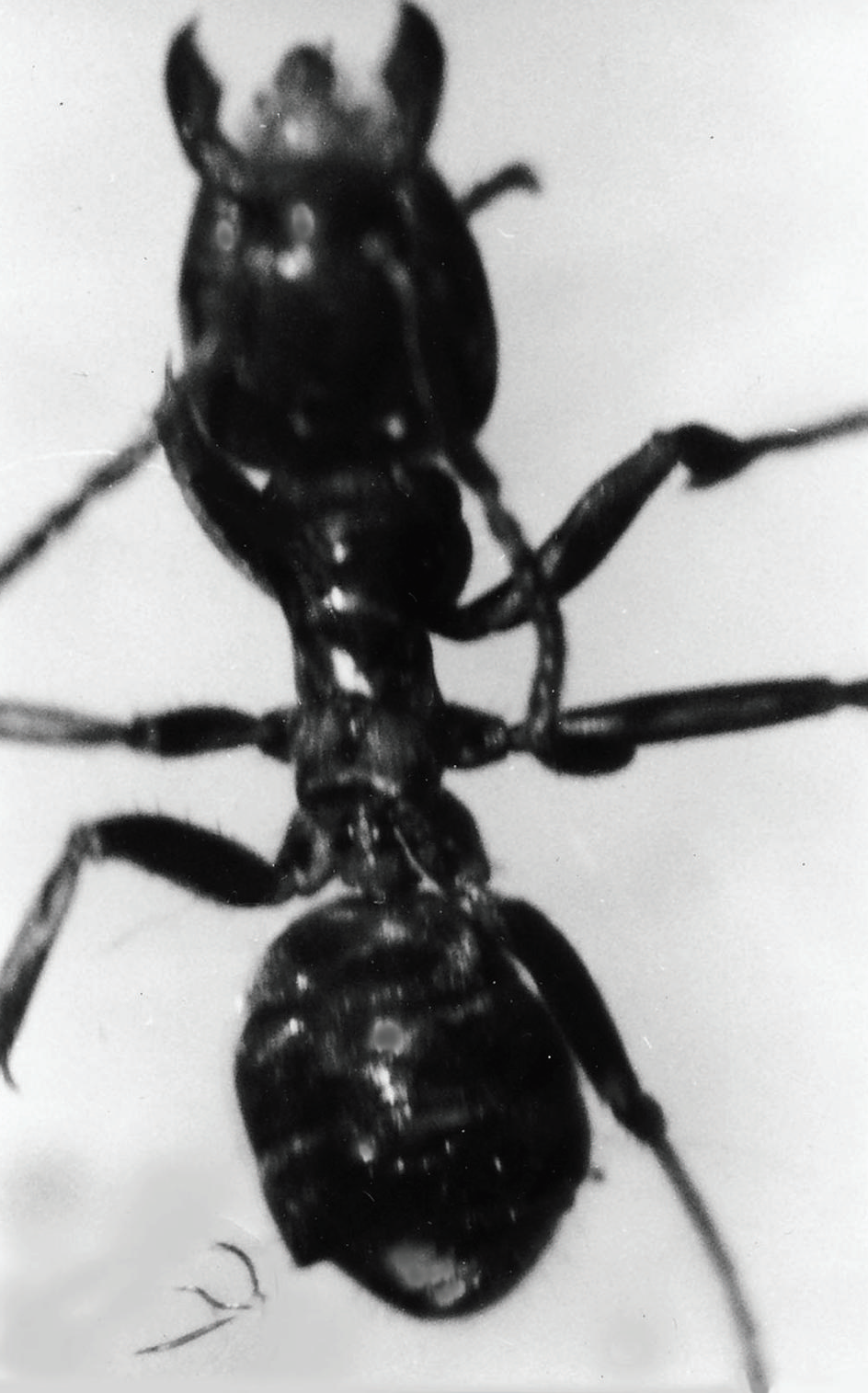
- worker with juvenile Formicodiplogaster myrmenema

Scientific classification
- Kingdom: Animalia
- Phylum: Arthropoda
- Clade: Pancrustacea
- Class: Insecta
- Order: Hymenoptera
- Family: Formicidae
- Subfamily: Dolichoderinae
- Genus: Azteca
- Species: †A. alpha

Binomial name
- †Azteca alpha Wilson, 1985

= Azteca alpha =

Azteca alpha Temporal range: Burdigalian

Species of ant

Azteca alpha is an extinct species of ant in the subfamily Dolichoderinae known from possibly Miocene fossils found on Hispaniola. A. alpha is one of only two species in the genus Azteca to have been described from fossils, both found in Dominican amber. It is the host for a fossil nematode, and has been preserved with scale insects.

== History and classification ==
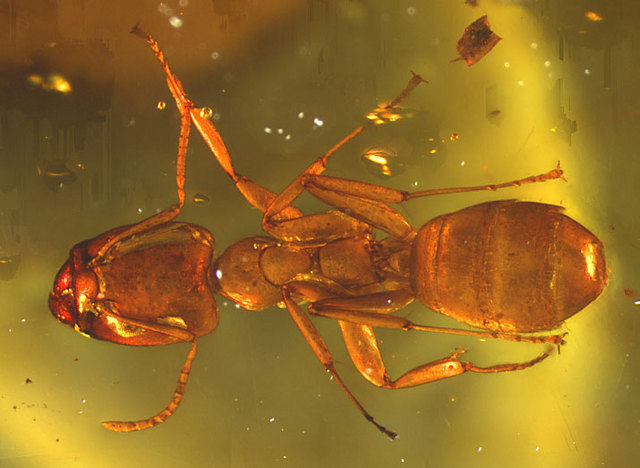
A. alpha dorsal view

When described Azteca alpha was known from approximately 560 fossil insects which are solitary or group inclusions in transparent chunks of Dominican amber. The amber was produced by the extinct Hymenaea protera, which formerly grew on Hispaniola, across northern South America and up to southern Mexico. The specimens were collected from a number of amber mines in fossil-bearing rocks of the Cordillera Septentrional mountains, northern Dominican Republic. The amber dates from at least the Burdigalian stage of the Miocene, based on studying the associated fossil foraminifera and may be as old as the Middle Eocene, based on the associated fossil coccoliths. This age range is due to the host rock being secondary deposits for the amber, and the Miocene the age range is only the youngest that it might be.

At the time of description, the holotype worker in addition to the paratype worker, male and queen specimens, were preserved in the Museum of Comparative Zoology amber collections. The fossils were first studied by entomologist Edward O. Wilson of the Harvard University, who published his type description of the new species in the journal Psyche in 1985. The specific epithet alpha, derived from the Latin alpha, was chosen both as a reference to the early geological occurrence of the species for the genus Azteca and in allusion to the sheer volume of A. alpha fossil inclusions in the Dominican amber. George Poinar Jr. noted that Azteca alpha fossils comprise up to 50% of the formicids in Dominican amber, and Wilson estimated that A. alpha represented 50% or more of them.

Portions of nests have also been fossilized and identified. They show an association of A. alpha colonies and the extinct nematode Formicodiplogaster myrmenema. The nests show active ant colonies in which adult and juvenile F. myrmenema are present. Individual examples of phoretic F myrmenema are preserved in a dauer stage that was possibly carried in the ants' abdominal intersegment membranes. The transition and transport of the dauer stage F myrmenema may have been a result of deteriorating conditions in the host colony. No direct evidence has been found for F. myrmenema living in the postpharyngeal glands or head glands of A. alpha. Another amber specimen with 23 pseudococcid scale insects, twenty female and nymphs and three males, associated closely with nine A. alpha workers has been described. While the pseudococcids likely were not full trophobionts, as indicated by wax extrusions from between the dorsal abdominal segments, the association indicates they were tended by the ants. The specimens in amber were possibly entombed while transporting the pseudococcids, an early representation in amber of ants tending scale insects.

== Description ==
Azteca alpha has a suite of traits that match modern species in the alfari group. A. alpha is separated from the other species in the group by the outline of the propodeum, the length of the antennae scape and in the density of the hairs covering the body. The males of A. alpha are nearly identical to males of the modern species A. fiebrigi. The queens are similar to A. fiebrigi but can be separated by the thinner outline of the petiole than is seen in A. fiebrigi. The second Dominican amber species, Azteca eumeces is separated from A. alpha by the notably elongated head capsule of the workers.
