= Azteca diabolica =

Scientific classification
- Kingdom: Animalia
- Phylum: Arthropoda
- Clade: Pancrustacea
- Class: Insecta
- Order: Hymenoptera
- Family: Formicidae
- Subfamily: Dolichoderinae
- Genus: Azteca
- Species: A. diabolica

Binomial name
- Azteca diabolica Guerrero, Delabie & Dejean, 2010

Species of ant

Azteca diabolica is a species of ant in the genus Azteca. Described by Guerrero, Delabie and Dejean in 2010, the species is endemic to Panama.

== Nomenclature ==
Azteca diabolica is named for the distinctive horned shape of the reproductive female's head, reminiscent of the devil.
