= Sailfin snake-eel =

Conservation status
- Least Concern (IUCN 3.1)

Scientific classification
- Kingdom: Animalia
- Phylum: Chordata
- Class: Actinopterygii
- Order: Anguilliformes
- Family: Ophichthidae
- Genus: Letharchus
- Species: L. rosenblatti

Binomial name
- Letharchus rosenblatti McCosker, 1974

Species of fish

The Sailfin snake-eel (Letharchus rosenblatti) also known as the Black sailfin eel in Mexico,) is an eel in the family Ophichthidae (worm/snake eels). It was described by John E. McCosker in 1974. It is a marine, tropical eel which is known from the eastern central and southeastern Pacific Ocean, including Colombia, Ecuador, Costa Rica, Panama and Mexico. It dwells at a depth range of 0 to 17 metres (0 to 56 ft), and inhabits sand sediments. Males can reach a maximum total length of 31 centimetres (12 in).

Due to a lack of known major threats and lack of observed population decline, the IUCN redlist currently lists the Sailfin snake-eel as Least Concern.
