= Azteca constructor =

Scientific classification
- Kingdom: Animalia
- Phylum: Arthropoda
- Class: Insecta
- Order: Hymenoptera
- Family: Formicidae
- Subfamily: Dolichoderinae
- Genus: Azteca
- Species: A. constructor

Binomial name
- Azteca constructor Emery, 1896

Synonyms
- Azteca emmae Forel, 1904; Azteca guianae Wheeler, W.M., 1942

Species of ant

Azteca constructor is a species of ant in the genus Azteca. Described by Emery in 1896, the species is endemic to several countries in Central America and South America.
