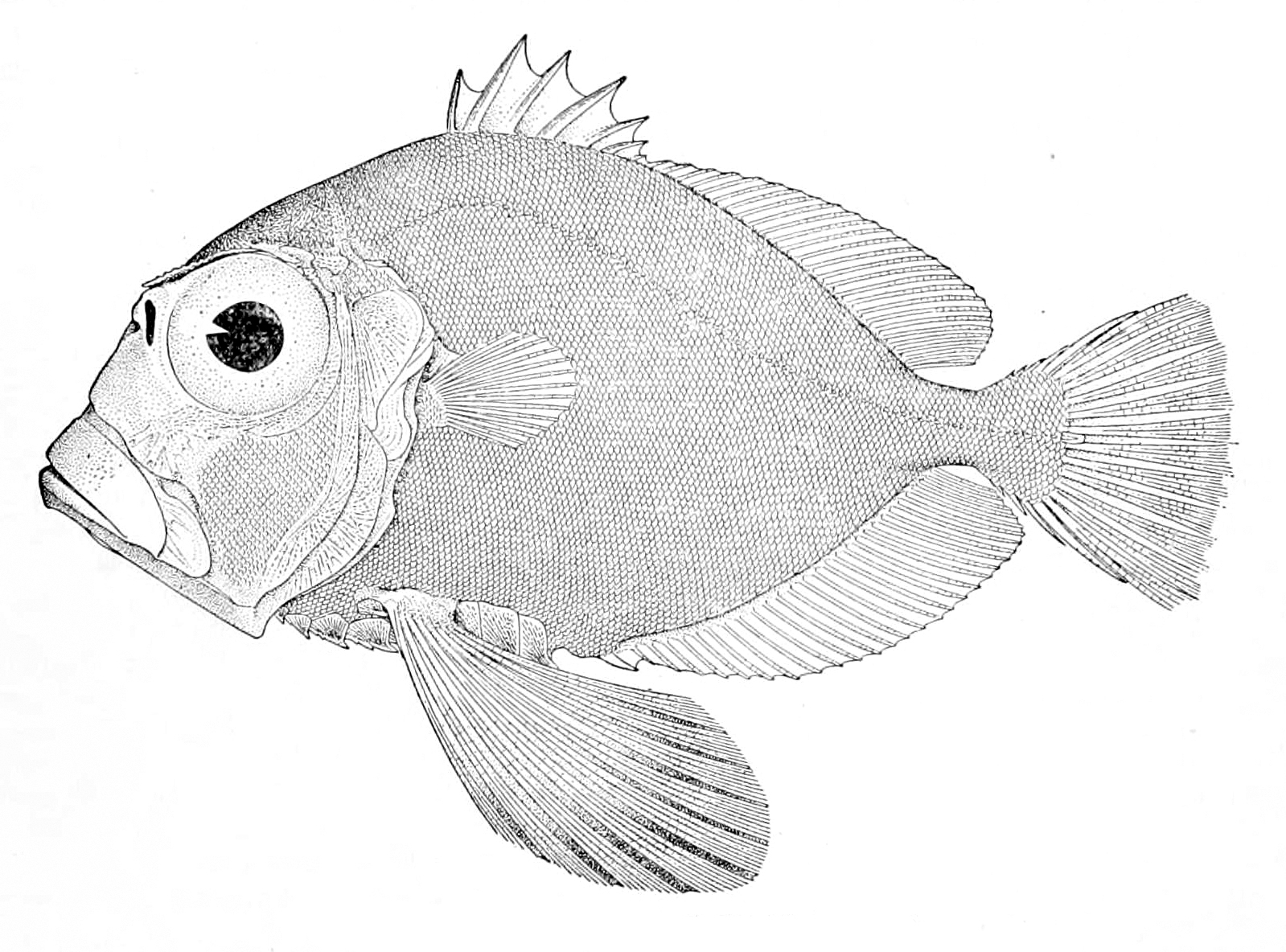

Scientific classification
- Kingdom: Animalia
- Phylum: Chordata
- Class: Actinopterygii
- Order: Zeiformes
- Family: Parazenidae
- Subfamily: Cyttopsinae
- Genus: Stethopristes; C. H. Gilbert, 1905
- Species: S. eos

Binomial name
- Stethopristes eos C. H. Gilbert, 1905

= Stethopristes =

Species of fish

Stethopristes eos is a species of zeiform fish found in the Pacific Ocean where it has so far only been recorded from near Chile and near Hawaii. It is known from depths of from 343 to 686 metres (1,125 to 2,251 ft). This species is the only known member of its genus.
