= Azteca bequaerti =

Scientific classification
- Kingdom: Animalia
- Phylum: Arthropoda
- Class: Insecta
- Order: Hymenoptera
- Family: Formicidae
- Subfamily: Dolichoderinae
- Genus: Azteca
- Species: A. bequaerti

Binomial name
- Azteca bequaerti Wheeler, W.M. & Bequaert, 1929

Species of ant

Azteca bequaerti is a species of ant in the genus Azteca. Described by Wheeler & Bequaert in 1929, the species is endemic to Brazil and Peru.
