= Azteca brevicornis =

Scientific classification
- Kingdom: Animalia
- Phylum: Arthropoda
- Class: Insecta
- Order: Hymenoptera
- Family: Formicidae
- Subfamily: Dolichoderinae
- Genus: Azteca
- Species: A. brevicornis

Binomial name
- Azteca brevicornis (Mayr, 1878)

Subspecies
- Azteca brevicornis boliviana Wheeler, W.M. & Mann, 1942

Synonyms
- Liometopm brevicorne Mayr, 1878

Species of ant

Azteca brevicornis is a species of ant in the genus Azteca. Described by Mayr in 1878, the species is endemic to Brazil.
