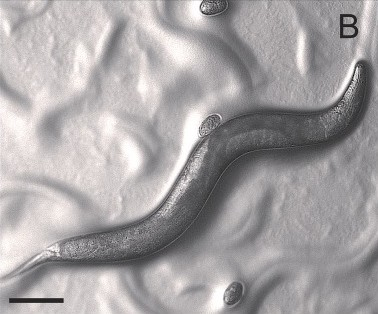
- Pristionchus pacificus

Scientific classification
- Kingdom: Animalia
- Phylum: Nematoda
- Class: Chromadorea
- Order: Rhabditida
- Family: Diplogastridae
- Genus: Pristionchus; Kreis 1932

= Pristionchus =

Genus of roundworms

Pristionchus is a genus of nematodes (roundworms) in the family Diplogastridae that currently includes more than 50 described species. They are known mainly as non-parasitic associates of insects, especially beetles, while others have been reported from soil, organic matter, or rotting wood. The genus includes P. pacificus, a satellite model organism to the well-studied nematode Caenorhabditis elegans.

== Ecology and mouth dimorphism ==
In Pristionchus species associated with insects, the nematodes usually live on their hosts in a dormant stage (the dauer larva). After the death of the host insect, the nematodes resume development, feeding and reproducing on the decaying host carcass. Most species of Pristionchus show a polyphenism in their feeding structures, which allows the nematodes to access different food resources in this rapidly changing environment. In one form (the "stenostomatous" form), the mouth is elongated, narrow, and equipped with one small tooth, whereas in the other ("eurystomatous" form) it is short, wide, and with two large teeth. The emergence of a particular form depends on specific environmental conditions and the availability of food. Whereas the stenostomatous form feeds primarily on microorganisms, the eurystomatous form can feed additionally on other nematodes. In the laboratory, Pristionchus species can be cultured on bacteria such as Escherichia coli.

== Reproduction ==
Most known species of Pristionchus have males and females, although several species are androdioecious, consisting of males and self-fertilizing hermaphrodites. Sex determination in Pristionchus species is by an X0 system, whereby males have one sex (X) chromosome and females/hermaphrodites have two.

== Species ==
The following are all Pristionchus species that have been sequenced (most of them are kept in culture and available as frozen strains):

- Pristionchus aerivorus —from termites in North America
- Pristionchus americanus —from scarab beetles in North America
- Pristionchus arcanus —forms a cryptic species complex with P. pacificus and P. exspectatus; known from termites in Japan
- Pristionchus atlanticus —known from soil in the eastern United States
- Pristionchus auriculatae —from rotting fruits of the fig Ficus auriculata in Shanghai, China
- Pristionchus boliviae —androdioecious; from scarab beetles in South America
- Pristionchus borbonicus —from Réunion Island; notable for developing one of five different mouth forms depending on available food sources.
- Pristionchus brevicauda —from Eastern Europe
- Pristionchus bucculentus —associated with shining mushroom beetles and pleasing fungus beetles in Japan
- Pristionchus bulgaricus —from the rose chafer in Eastern Europe
- Pristionchus chinensis —from the scarab beetle Mimela sp. in Bubeng field station CAS, China
- Pristionchus clavus —from Eastern Europe
- Pristionchus degawai —from millipedes in Japan
- Pristionchus dorci —from the stag beetle Dorcus davidis in Ganquan, China
- Pristionchus elegans —from dung beetles in Japan
- Pristionchus entomophagus —hermaphroditic (males rare); cosmopolitan, common in Europe, especially on scarab beetles
- Pristionchus exspectatus —the putative sister species of P. pacificus; reported from stag beetles
- Pristionchus fukushimae —from scarab beetles in Japan
- Pristionchus fissidentatus —androdioecious; from Nepal and La Réunion Island
- Pristionchus hongkongensis —from stag beetles in Hong Kong
- Pristionchus hoplostomus —collected from soil in Japan
- Pristionchus japonicus —from soil around a dead earthworm in Japan
- Pristionchus kurosawai —from Lucanus kurosawa in Songquangang, Taiwan
- Pristionchus laevicollis —from millipedes in Japan
- Pristionchus lheritieri —common in Europe; reported from soil, organic material, and dung beetles
- Pristionchus lucani —from stag beetles in France
- Pristionchus magnoliae —from fruit of Magnolia grandiflora in Shanghai, China
- Pristionchus marianneae —from Popilia japonica near Geneva, New York, USA
- Pristionchus maupasi —androdioecious; from Europe and North America, especially in association with May beetles
- Pristionchus maxplancki —from stag beetles in Japan; closest known outgroup to the P. pacificus species complex
- Pristionchus mayeri —androdioecious; from scarab beetles on La Réunion and Mauritius
- Pristionchus musae —from banana "Musa, sp." in Yuanyang, China
- Pristionchus neolucani —from stag beetles in Hong Kong
- Pristionchus nudus —from a longhorn beetle, Cerambycidae, in Xishuangbanna, China
- Pristionchus occultus —from Taiwan
- Pristionchus pacificus —cosmopolitan distribution, most commonly in association with scarab beetles; an established laboratory model species
- Pristionchus paranudus —from rotting water hyacinth bulbs in Yuanyang, China
- Pristionchus passalidorum —from Passalidae sp. in Ailaoshan field station CAS, China
- Pristionchus pauli —from scarab beetles in the eastern United States
- Pristionchus paulseni —from Lucanus taiwanensis in Taroko National Park, Taiwan
- Pristionchus pseudaerivorus —from North America
- Pristionchus purgamentorium —from Mimela sp. in Ganquan, China
- Pristionchus quartusdecimus —from the Oriental beetle in Japan
- Pristionchus racemosae
- Pristionchus riukiariae —from millipedes in Japan
- Pristionchus sikae —from the stag beetle Dorcus titanus sika in Huisun, Taiwan
- Pristionchus sycomori —from Ficus sycomorus fig fruit in South Africa
- Pristionchus taiwanensis
- Pristionchus triformis —androdioecious; associated with dung beetles and other scarab beetles; reported from Europe, La Réunion, and Canada
- Pristionchus uniformis —associated with the Colorado potato beetle in Europe and North America
- Pristionchus yamagatae —from Holotrichia kiotoensis in Mamurogawa, Yamagata, Japan

== Molecular phylogeny ==
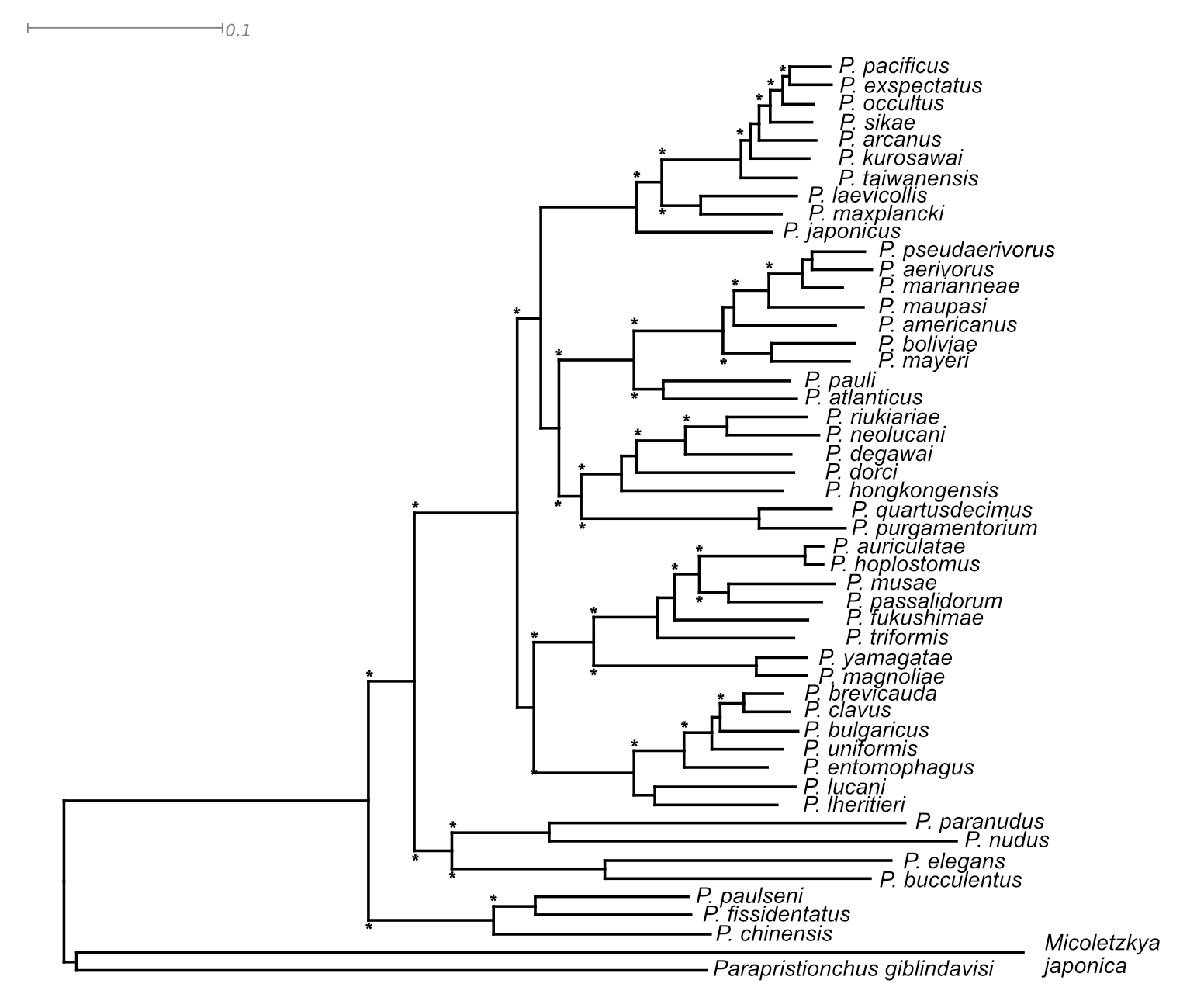
