= Azteca aragua =

Scientific classification
- Kingdom: Animalia
- Phylum: Arthropoda
- Class: Insecta
- Order: Hymenoptera
- Family: Formicidae
- Subfamily: Dolichoderinae
- Genus: Azteca
- Species: A. aragua

Binomial name
- Azteca aragua Longino, 1991

Species of ant

Azteca aragua is a species of ant in the genus Azteca. Described by Longino in 1991, the species is widespread in Venezuela.
