= Azteca barbifex =

Scientific classification
- Kingdom: Animalia
- Phylum: Arthropoda
- Class: Insecta
- Order: Hymenoptera
- Family: Formicidae
- Subfamily: Dolichoderinae
- Genus: Azteca
- Species: A. barbifex

Binomial name
- Azteca barbifex Forel, 1906

Species of ant

Azteca barbifex is a species of ant in the genus Azteca. Described by Auguste-Henri Forel in 1906, the species is endemic to North America and South America.
