= Letharchus aliculatus =

Conservation status
- Data Deficient (IUCN 3.1)

Scientific classification
- Kingdom: Animalia
- Phylum: Chordata
- Class: Actinopterygii
- Order: Anguilliformes
- Family: Ophichthidae
- Genus: Letharchus
- Species: L. aliculatus

Binomial name
- Letharchus aliculatus McCosker, 1974

Species of fish

Letharchus aliculatus is an eel in the family Ophichthidae (worm/snake eels). It was described by John E. McCosker in 1974. It is a marine, tropical eel which is known from Brazil in the southwestern Atlantic Ocean. It is known to dwell at a depth range of 0 to 1 metre (0.0 to 3.3 ft), and inhabit sand sediments and rock tides. Males can reach a maximum total length of 21.5 centimetres (8.5 in).
