= Azteca coussapoae =

Scientific classification
- Kingdom: Animalia
- Phylum: Arthropoda
- Class: Insecta
- Order: Hymenoptera
- Family: Formicidae
- Subfamily: Dolichoderinae
- Genus: Azteca
- Species: A. coussapoae

Binomial name
- Azteca coussapoae Forel, 1904

Species of ant

Azteca coussapoae is a species of ant in the genus Azteca. Described by Auguste-Henri Forel in 1905, the species is endemic to Brazil.
