= Azteca crassicornis =

Scientific classification
- Kingdom: Animalia
- Phylum: Arthropoda
- Class: Insecta
- Order: Hymenoptera
- Family: Formicidae
- Subfamily: Dolichoderinae
- Genus: Azteca
- Species: A. crassicornis

Binomial name
- Azteca crassicornis Emery, 1893

Species of ant

Azteca crassicornis is a species of ant in the genus Azteca. Described by Emery in 1893, the species is endemic to Brazil.
