= Azteca depilis =

Scientific classification
- Kingdom: Animalia
- Phylum: Arthropoda
- Class: Insecta
- Order: Hymenoptera
- Family: Formicidae
- Subfamily: Dolichoderinae
- Genus: Azteca
- Species: A. depilis

Binomial name
- Azteca depilis Emery, 1893

Species of ant

Azteca depilis is a species of ant in the genus Azteca. Described by Carlo Emery in 1893, the species is endemic to South America.
