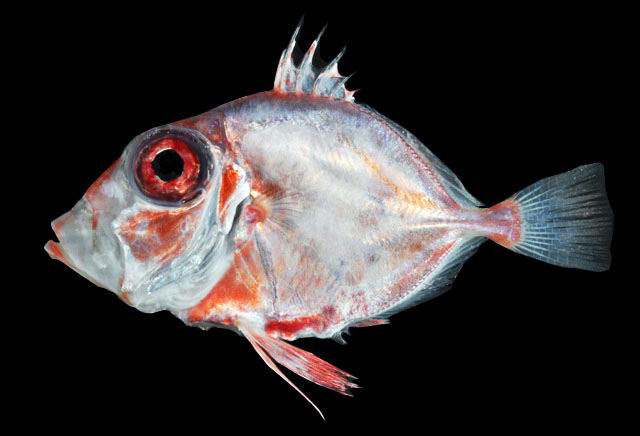

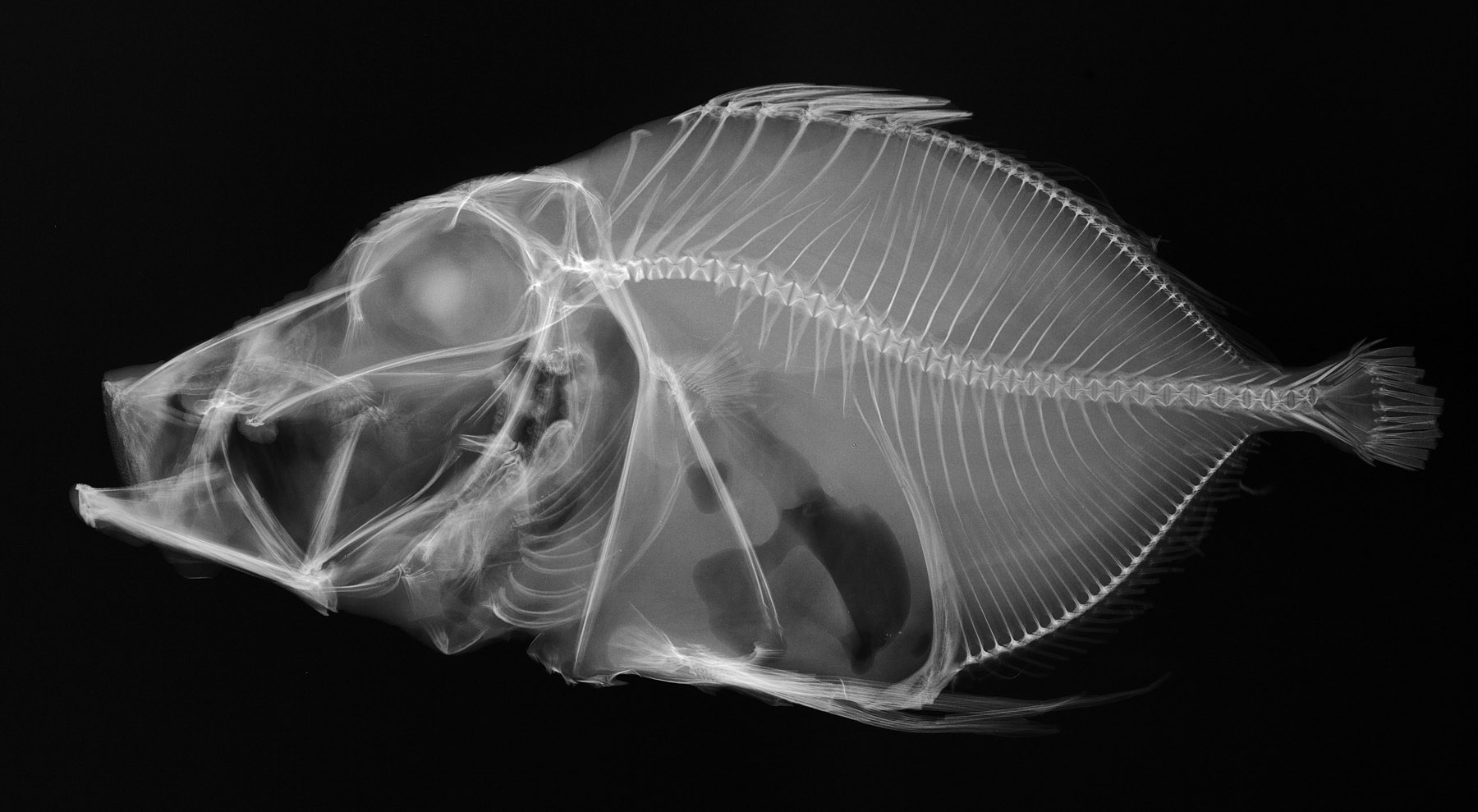
- Cyttopsis rosea, conventional and X-ray images

Scientific classification
- Kingdom: Animalia
- Phylum: Chordata
- Class: Actinopterygii
- Order: Zeiformes
- Family: Parazenidae
- Subfamily: Cyttopsinae
- Genus: Cyttopsis; T. N. Gill, 1862

= Cyttopsis =

Genus of fishes

Cyttopsis is a genus of fishes.

== Species ==
There are currently two recognized species in this genus:

- Cyttopsis cypho (Fowler, 1934) (Little dory)
- Cyttopsis rosea (R. T. Lowe, 1843) (Rosy dory)
