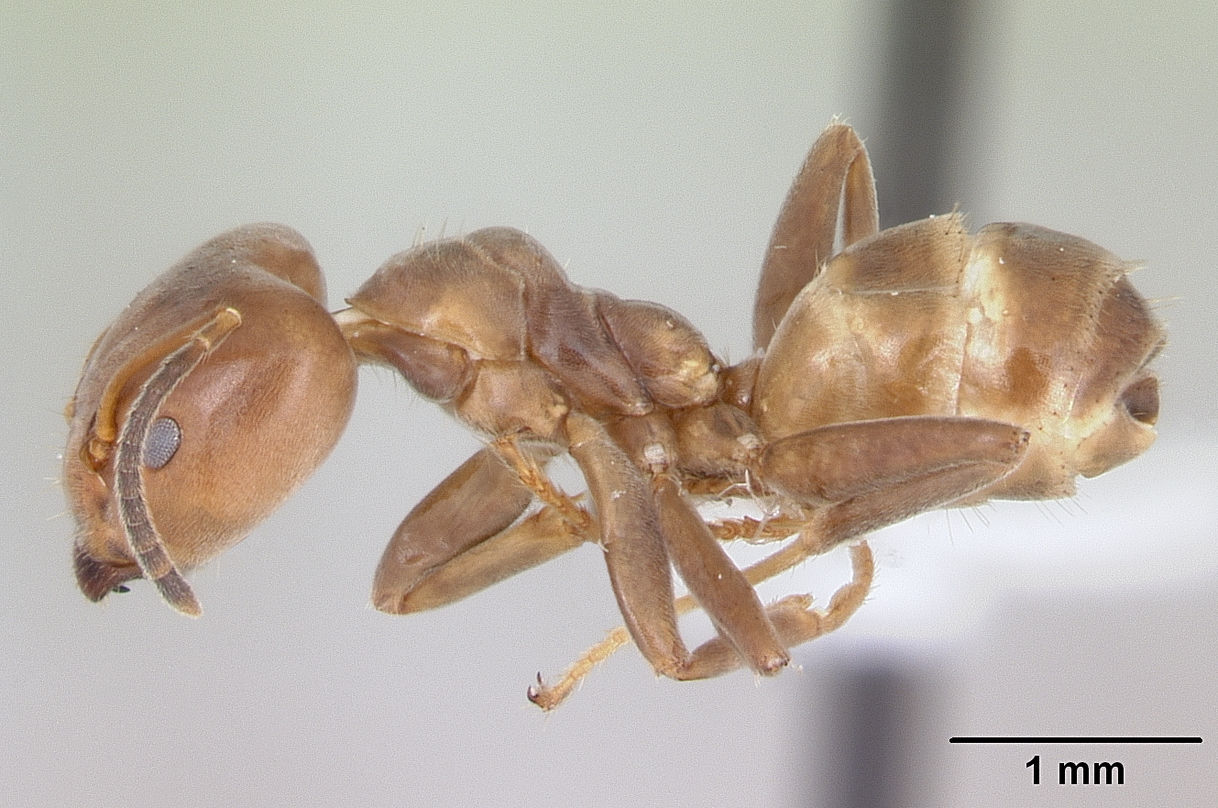

Scientific classification
- Kingdom: Animalia
- Phylum: Arthropoda
- Class: Insecta
- Order: Hymenoptera
- Family: Formicidae
- Subfamily: Dolichoderinae
- Genus: Azteca
- Species: A. adrepens

Binomial name
- Azteca adrepens Forel, 1911

= Azteca adrepens =

Species of ant

Azteca adrepens is a species of ant in the genus Azteca. Described by Auguste-Henri Forel in 1911, the species is endemic to Paraguay.
