= Sachsia (nematode) =

Scientific classification
- Kingdom: Animalia
- Phylum: Nematoda
- Class: Chromadorea
- Order: Rhabditida
- Family: Diplogastridae
- Genus: Sachsia; Meyl, 1960

Species
- Sachsia postpapillata Mumtaz & Ahmad, 2019; Sachsia zurstrasseni (Sachs, 1950) Meyl, 1960

Genus of nematodes

Sachsia is a genus of nematodes in the family Diplogastridae.
