= Paraletharchus =

Scientific classification
- Kingdom: Animalia
- Phylum: Chordata
- Class: Actinopterygii
- Order: Anguilliformes
- Family: Ophichthidae
- Subfamily: Ophichthinae
- Genus: Paraletharchus; McCosker, 1974

Type species
- Letharchus pacificus R. C. Osburn & Nichols, 1916

Species
- See text.

Genus of fishes

Paraletharchus is a genus of eels in the snake eel family Ophichthidae.

== Species ==
There are currently two recognized species in this genus:

- Paraletharchus opercularis (G. S. Myers & Wade, 1941) (Pouched snake-eel)
- Paraletharchus pacificus (R. C. Osburn & Nichols, 1916) (Sailfin eel)
