= Azteca coeruleipennis =

Scientific classification
- Kingdom: Animalia
- Phylum: Arthropoda
- Class: Insecta
- Order: Hymenoptera
- Family: Formicidae
- Subfamily: Dolichoderinae
- Genus: Azteca
- Species: A. coeruleipennis

Binomial name
- Azteca coeruleipennis Emery, 1893
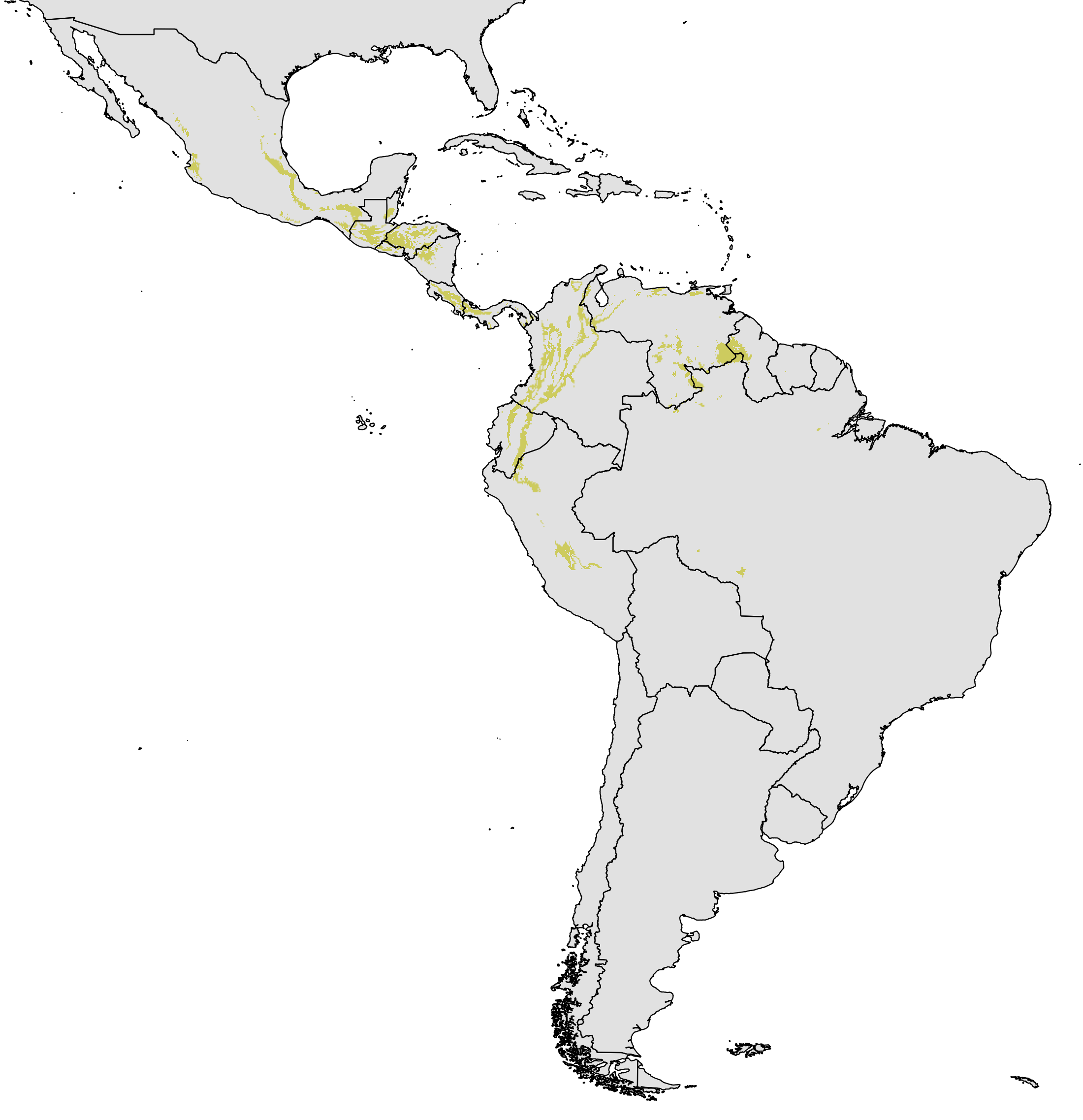

Species of ant

Azteca coeruleipennis is a species of ant in the genus Azteca. Described by Emery in 1893, the species is endemic to several countries in North America and Central America.
