= Diplogaster =

Scientific classification
- Domain: Eukaryota
- Kingdom: Animalia
- Phylum: Nematoda
- Class: Chromadorea
- Order: Rhabditida
- Family: Diplogastridae
- Genus: Diplogaster; Schultze, 1857

Genus of roundworms

Diplogaster is a genus of nematodes belonging to the family Diplogastridae.

The species of this genus are found in Europe, Africa and Northern America.

Species:

- Diplogaster australis Cobb, 1893
- Diplogaster gagarini (Tsalolichin, 1980) Sudhaus & Fürst von Lieven, 2003
- Diplogaster intermedia Cobb, 1906
- Diplogaster labiata Cobb, 1916
- Diplogaster macrura Hoeppli, 1926
- Diplogaster pararmatus Schneider, 1938
- Diplogaster parasitica von Linstow, 1907
- Diplogaster parvus Cobb, 1893
- Diplogaster pterygatus Timm, 1961
- Diplogaster rivalis (Leydig, 1854) Bütschli, 1873
- Diplogaster rivalis Leydig, 1854
- Diplogaster spirifer Skwarra, 1921
