= Parazan =

Parazan پرازن
- Village
- Location within Iran
- Coordinates: 26°32′26″N 57°30′06″E
- Country: Iran
- Province: Hormozgan
- County: Minab
- Bakhsh: Senderk
- Rural District: Dar Pahn

Population (2006)
  - Total: 34
- Time zone: UTC+3:30 (IRST)
  - Summer (DST): UTC+4:30 (IRDT)

Parazan (Persian: پرازن, also Romanized as Parāzan and Parāzen) is a village located in the Dar Pahn Rural District, of Senderk District, Minab County, Hormozgan Province, Iran. According to the 2006 census, the village had a population of 34 individuals, belonging to 5 families.
