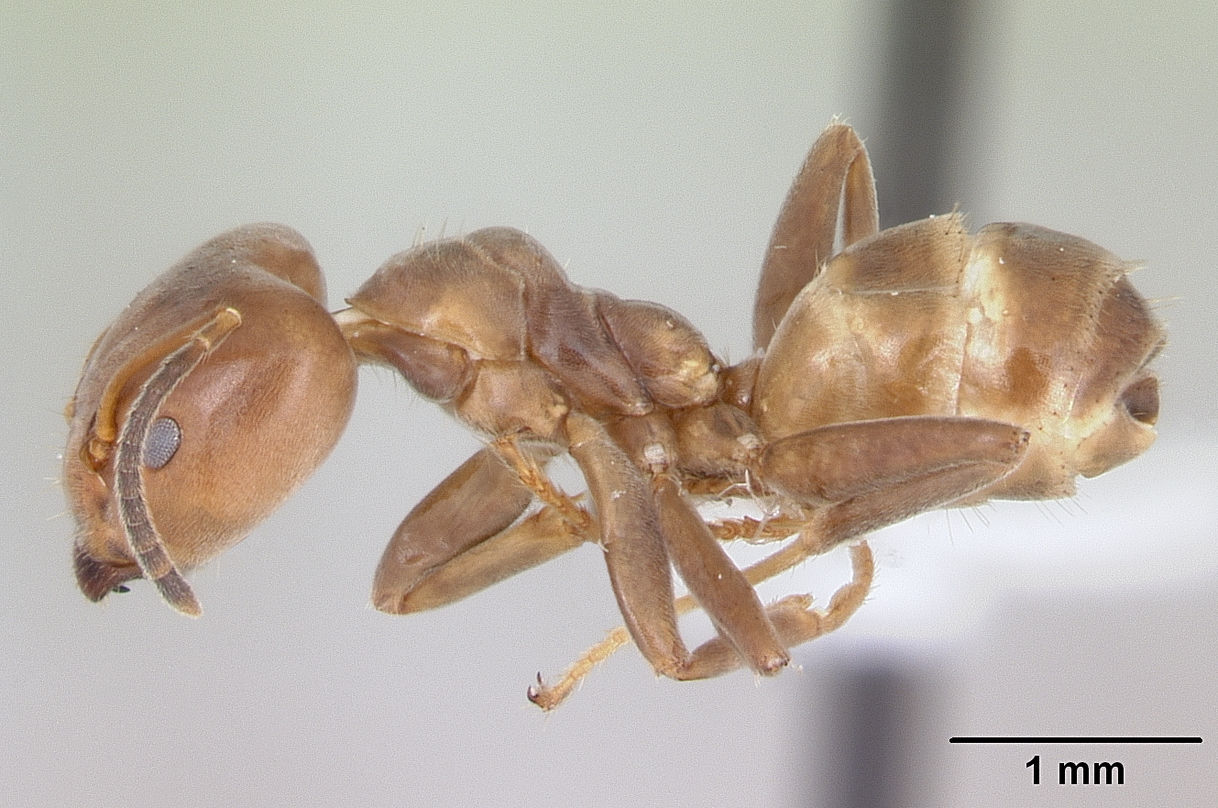
- Azteca adrepens worker from Paraguay

Scientific classification
- Kingdom: Animalia
- Phylum: Arthropoda
- Clade: Pancrustacea
- Class: Insecta
- Order: Hymenoptera
- Family: Formicidae
- Subfamily: Dolichoderinae
- Tribe: Leptomyrmecini
- Genus: Azteca; Forel, 1878

Type species
- Liometopum xanthochroum Roger, 1863

Diversity
- 86 species

= Azteca (ant) =

Genus of ants

Azteca is a strictly Neotropical genus of ants in the subfamily Dolichoderinae. The genus is very diverse and contains around 112 extant species and two fossil species. They are essentially arboreal and many species have mutualistic associations with particular plant species, where the genus Cecropia presents the most conspicuous association. In the Brazilian Amazonia, Azteca species are associated with species of Codonanthopsis.

== Species ==
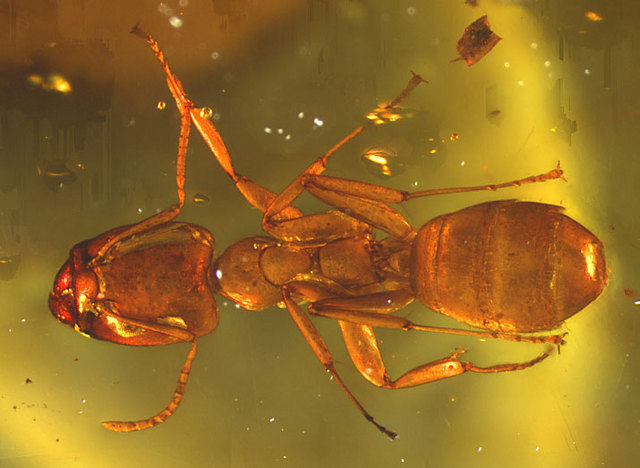
Azteca alpha worker in amber

- Azteca adrepens Forel, 1911
- Azteca aesopus Forel, 1908
- Azteca alfari Emery, 1893
- †Azteca alpha Wilson, 1985
- Azteca andreae Guerrero, Delabie & Dejean, 2010
- Azteca angusticeps Emery, 1893
- Azteca aragua Longino, 1991
- Azteca aurita Emery, 1893
- Azteca australis Wheeler, 1942
- Azteca barbifex Forel, 1906
- Azteca beltii Emery, 1893
- Azteca bequaerti Wheeler & Bequaert, 1929
- Azteca brevicornis (Mayr, 1878)
- Azteca brevis Forel, 1899
- Azteca chartifex Forel, 1896
- Azteca christopherseni Forel, 1912
- Azteca coeruleipennis Emery, 1893
- Azteca constructor Emery, 1896
- Azteca cordincola Forel, 1921
- Azteca coussapoae Forel, 1904
- Azteca crassicornis Emery, 1893
- Azteca delpini Emery, 1893
- Azteca depilis Emery, 1893
- Azteca diabolica Guerrero, Delabie & Dejean, 2010
- Azteca duckei Forel, 1906
- Azteca duroiae Forel, 1904
- Azteca emeryi Forel, 1904
- †Azteca eumeces Wilson, 1985
- Azteca fasciata Emery, 1893
- Azteca flavigaster Longino, 2007
- Azteca forelii Emery, 1893
- Azteca foveiceps Wheeler, 1921
- Azteca gnava Forel, 1906
- Azteca godmani Forel, 1899
- Azteca goeldii Forel, 1906
- Azteca huberi Forel, 1906
- Azteca hypophylla Forel, 1899
- Azteca iheringi Forel, 1915
- Azteca instabilis (Smith, 1862)
- Azteca isthmica Wheeler, 1942
- Azteca jelskii Emery, 1893
- Azteca juruensis Forel, 1904
- Azteca lallemandi Forel, 1899
- Azteca lanuginosa Emery, 1893
- Azteca lattkei Longino, 1991
- Azteca laurae Guerrero, Delabie & Dejean, 2010
- Azteca linamariae Guerrero, Delabie & Dejean, 2010
- Azteca longiceps Emery, 1893
- Azteca lucida Forel, 1899
- Azteca luederwaldti Forel, 1909
- Azteca mayrii Emery, 1893
- Azteca merida Longino, 1991
- Azteca minor Forel, 1904
- Azteca muelleri Emery, 1893
- Azteca nanogyna Longino, 2007
- Azteca nigra Forel, 1912
- Azteca nigricans Forel, 1899
- Azteca oecocordia Longino, 2007
- Azteca olitrix Forel, 1904
- Azteca ovaticeps Forel, 1904
- Azteca paraensis Forel, 1904
- Azteca petalocephala Longino, 1991
- Azteca pilosula Forel, 1899
- Azteca pittieri Forel, 1899
- Azteca polymorpha Forel, 1899
- Azteca quadraticeps Longino, 2007
- Azteca salti Wheeler & Darlington, 1930
- Azteca sapii Forel, 1912
- Azteca schimperi Emery, 1893
- Azteca schumannii Emery, 1893
- Azteca sericea (Mayr, 1866)
- Azteca sericeasur Longino, 2007
- Azteca severini Emery, 1896
- Azteca snellingi Guerrero, Delabie & Dejean, 2010
- Azteca stanleyuli Forel, 1921
- Azteca stigmatica Emery, 1896
- Azteca subopaca Forel, 1899
- Azteca tachigaliae Forel, 1904
- Azteca theresiae Forel, 1899
- Azteca tonduzi Forel, 1899
- Azteca trailii Emery, 1893
- Azteca trianguliceps Forel, 1912
- Azteca trigona Emery, 1893
- Azteca ulei Forel, 1904
- Azteca velox Forel, 1899
- Azteca xanthochroa (Roger, 1863)
