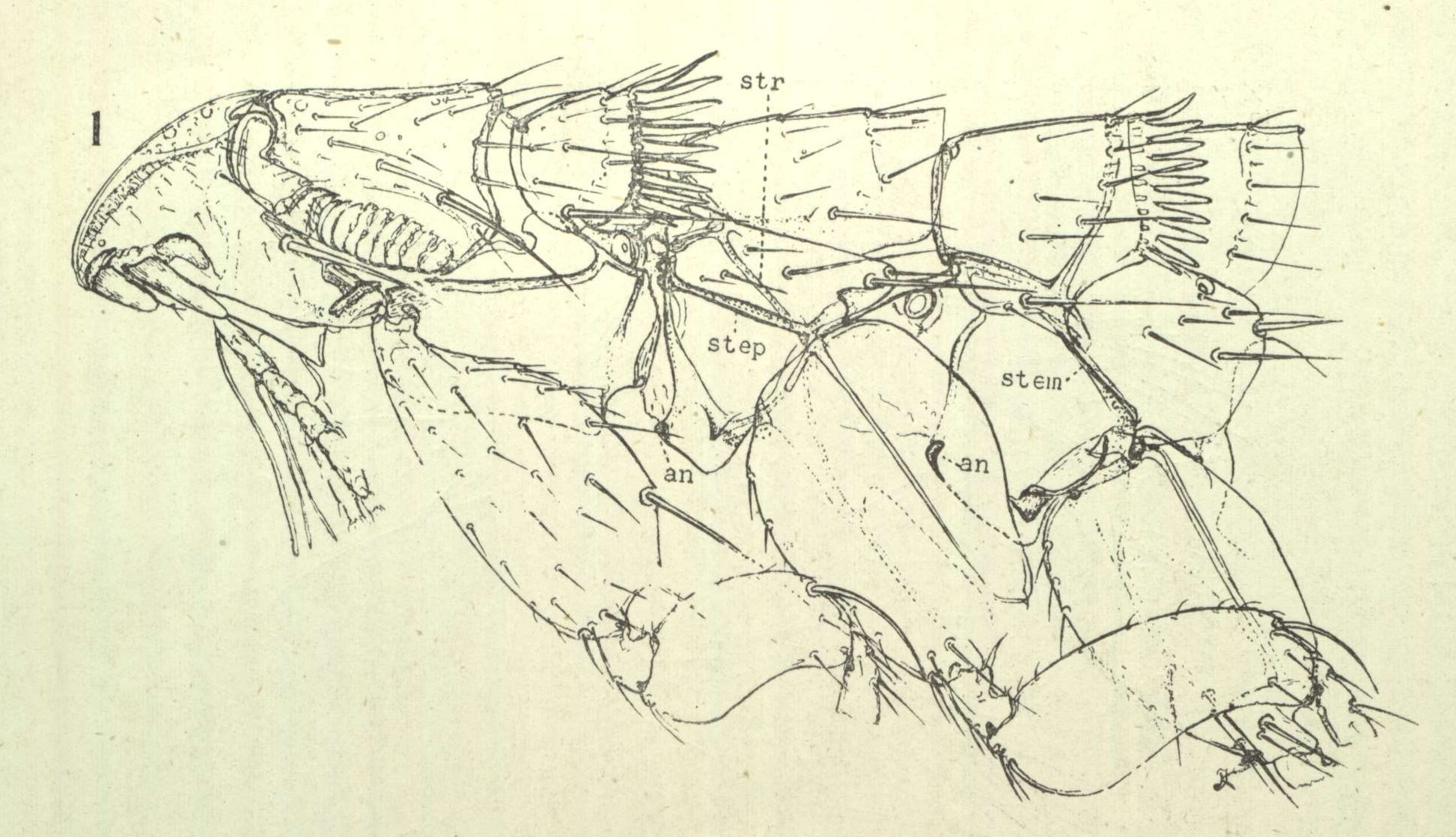

Conservation status
- Nationally Vulnerable (NZ TCS)

Scientific classification
- Kingdom: Animalia
- Phylum: Arthropoda
- Clade: Pancrustacea
- Class: Insecta
- Order: Siphonaptera
- Family: Ischnopsyllidae
- Genus: Porribius
- Species: P. pacificus

Binomial name
- Porribius pacificus Jordan, 1946

= New Zealand bat flea =

Species of flea

The New Zealand bat flea (Porribius pacificus) is a threatened species of flea endemic to New Zealand. The species was first described in 1946 from samples collected near Masterton in 1915, and from chocolate wattled bats on Pelorus Island.

It is adapted to living with the New Zealand long-tailed bat; like this bat species, the flea's closest relatives are in Australia, and its ancestor is likely to have colonised New Zealand from Australia with its host within the last 2 million years. It has also been recorded as living on the New Zealand lesser short-tailed bat, but these occurrences are thought to be accidental.

== Conservation status ==
The New Zealand bat flea was given the conservation status of "Nationally Vulnerable" by the Department of Conservation in 2015.
