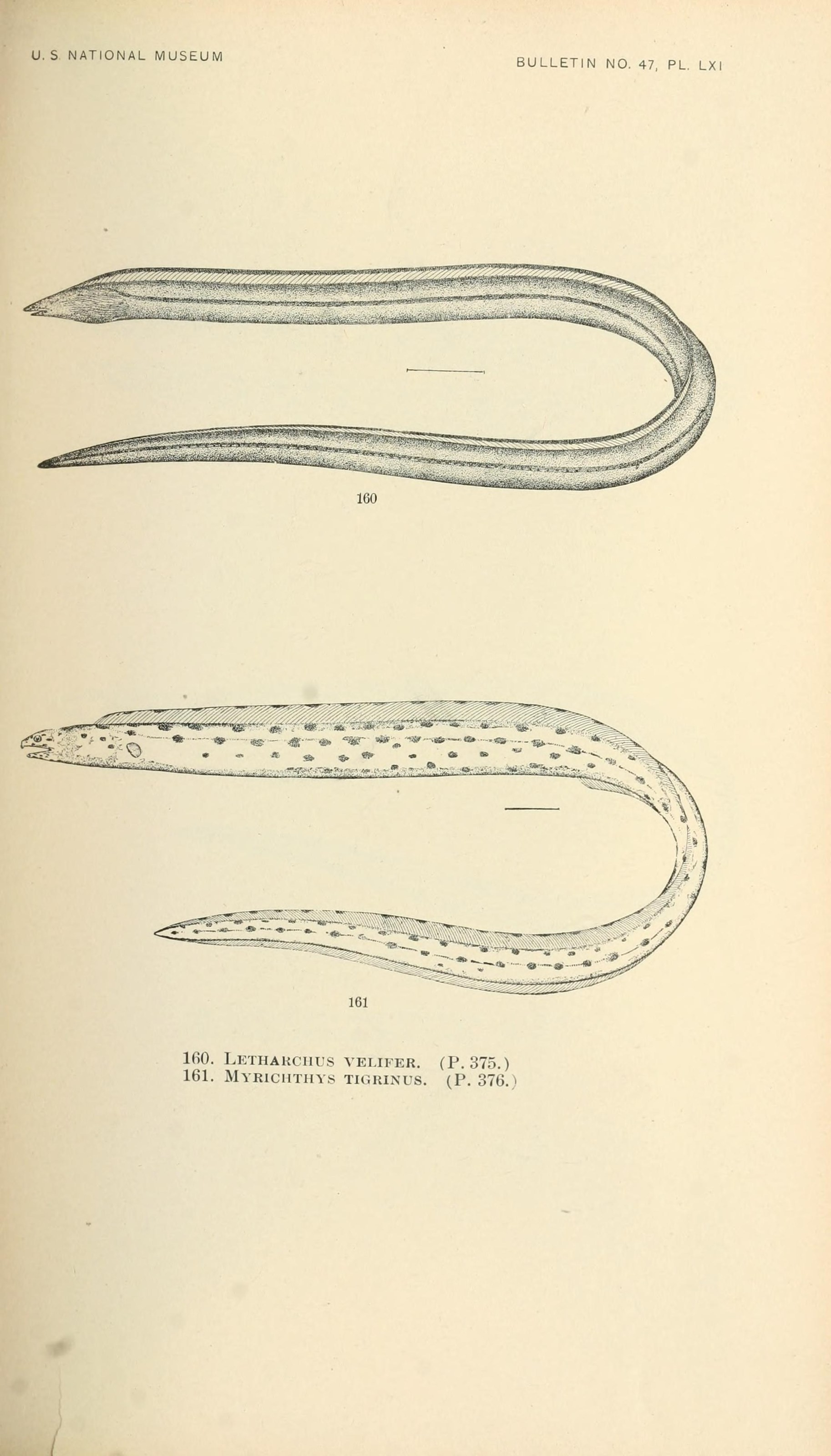
- Letharcus velifur (top)

Scientific classification
- Domain: Eukaryota
- Kingdom: Animalia
- Phylum: Chordata
- Class: Actinopterygii
- Order: Anguilliformes
- Family: Ophichthidae
- Subfamily: Ophichthinae
- Genus: Letharchus; Goode & T. H. Bean, 1882

Type species
- Letharchus velifer Goode & T. H. Bean, 1882

Species
- See text.

Synonyms
- Paraletharchus McCosker, 1974

= Letharchus =

Genus of fishes

Letharchus is a genus of eels in the snake eel family Ophichthidae. It currently contains the following species:

- Letharchus aliculatus McCosker, 1974
- Letharchus rosenblatti McCosker, 1974 (Sailfin snake-eel)
- Letharchus velifer Goode & T. H. Bean, 1882 (American sailfin eel)
