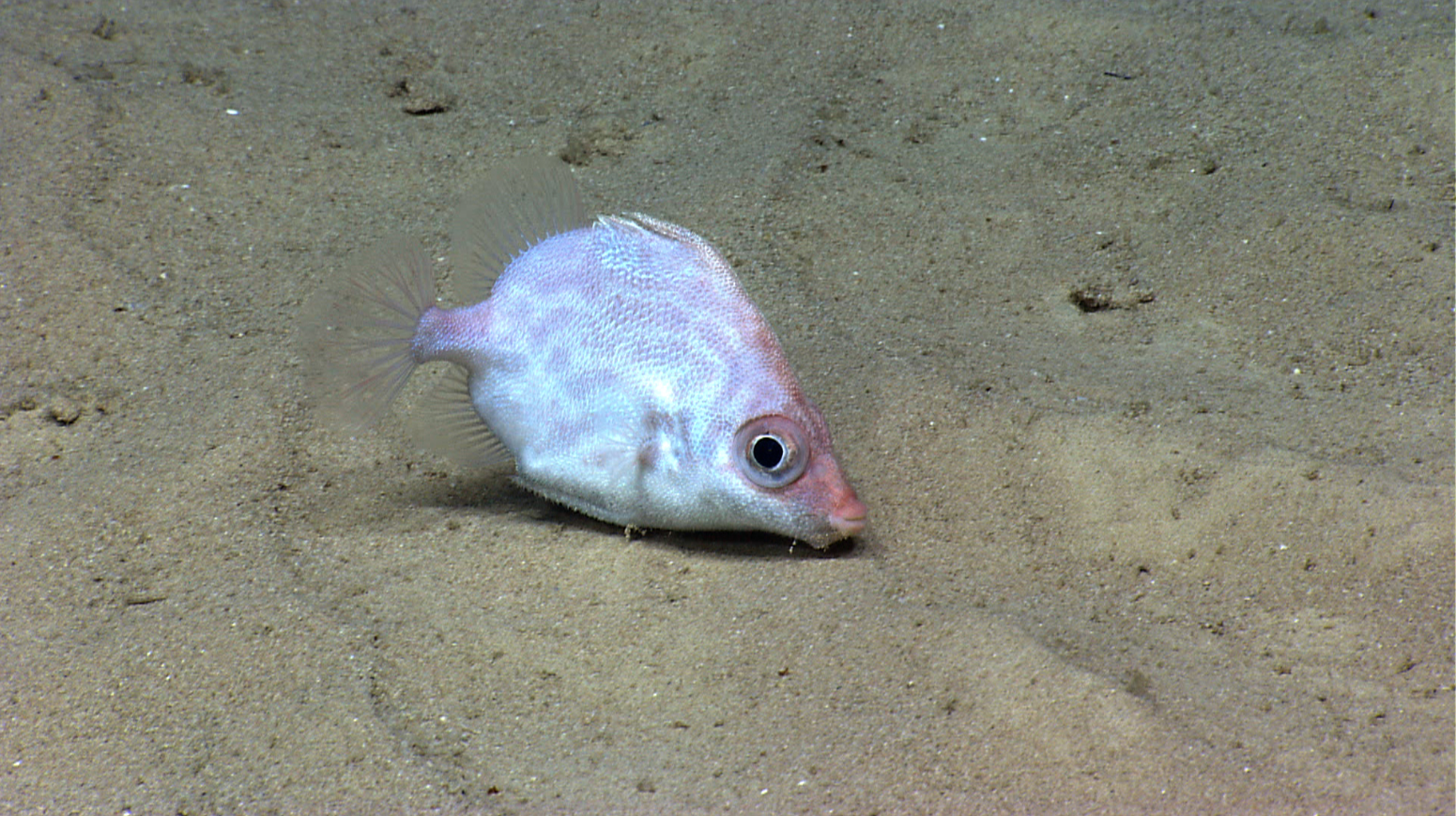
- Parazen pacificus near Puerto Rico in April 2015.

Conservation status
- Least Concern (IUCN 3.1)

Scientific classification
- Kingdom: Animalia
- Phylum: Chordata
- Class: Actinopterygii
- Order: Zeiformes
- Family: Parazenidae
- Subfamily: Parazeninae; McAllister, 1968
- Genus: Parazen; Kamohara, 1935
- Species: P. pacificus

Binomial name
- Parazen pacificus Kamohara, 1935

= Parazen pacificus =

Species of fish

Parazen pacificus, the parazen or slender dory, is a species of zeiform fish found in deep oceanic waters at depths of from 145 to 500 metres (476 to 1,640 ft). This species grows to a length of 14 centimetres (5.5 in) TL. This species is the only known member of the genus Parazen.
