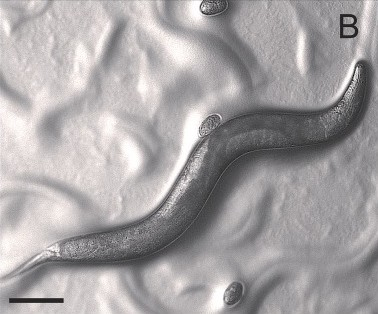

Scientific classification
- Kingdom: Animalia
- Phylum: Nematoda
- Class: Chromadorea
- Order: Rhabditida
- Family: Diplogastridae
- Genus: Pristionchus
- Species: P. pacificus

Binomial name
- Pristionchus pacificus Sommer, Carta, Kim & Sternberg, 1996

= Pristionchus pacificus =

Species of roundworm

Pristionchus pacificus is a species of free-living nematodes (roundworms) in the family Diplogastridae. The species has been established as a satellite model organism to Caenorhabditis elegans, with which it shared a common ancestor 200–300 million years ago. The genome of P. pacificus has been fully sequenced, which in combination with other tools for genetic analysis make this species a tractable model in the laboratory, especially for studies of developmental biology.

== Mouth dimorphism ==
Like other species of Pristionchus and many other free-living nematodes, P. pacificus exhibits a polyphenism in its mouthparts that allows individual nematodes to specialize on different food sources, which has made the species a case study in phenotypic plasticity. The polyphenism has two forms (morphs). The most common type, at least in wild-type lab strains, is the "eurystomatous" morph, which can feed on both bacteria and other nematode species. The "stenostomatous" morph, on the other hand, is specialised for feeding on bacteria exclusively.

Differentiation into one or the other morph depends on a combination of environmental conditions and stochasticity. The main morphological differences can be seen in the mouthparts. The eurystomatous morph has a secondary tooth and a wider buccal cavity. The secondary tooth allows the eurystomatous morph to feed on other nematode worms. The two feeding morphs, which allow the nematodes to respond quickly to changing environments, are specified by a hormonal and genetic cascade during larval development.

== Self-recognition ==
As a predatory species that feeds on related species, it is likely that there is a selective pressure for self-recognition, i.e. recognition of conspecifics. P. pacificus does not feed on conspecifics and therefore must be capable of distinguishing them from other nematode species. Self-recognition is not cilia-dependent, unlike prey recognition.

== Genomics ==
The Pristionchus pacificus genome was sequenced in 2005 and 2006. The analysis of P. pacificus has provided ecological information about this organism. It was determined that the genome of P. pacificus is larger than that of the widely studied nematode C. elegans, and was predicted that the genome of P. pacificus contains more than 26,000 protein-coding genes.

== Ecology ==
It has been indicated that Pristionchus nematodes live in a necromenic association with scarab beetles. "After the beetle dies, the nematode continues to develop and feed on microbes growing inside the dead beetle. The collection of bacteria, fungi and the nematodes work hand in hand to decompose the beetle carcass". Thus, Pristionchus is an omnivore that can utilize bacteria, protozoa and fungi as food sources, all of which grow on the carcasses of scarab beetles.
