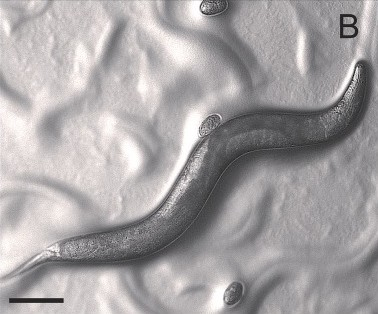

Scientific classification
- Kingdom: Animalia
- Phylum: Nematoda
- Class: Chromadorea
- Order: Rhabditida
- Infraorder: Diplogasteromorpha
- Superfamily: Diplogasteroidea
- Family: Diplogastridae; Micoletzky 1922

Genera
- See text

Synonyms
- Cephalobiidae; Mehdinematidae; Neodiplogastridae; Pseudodiplogasteroididae; Tylopharyngidae

= Diplogastridae =

Diplogastridae Temporal range: Burdigalian–present

Family of roundworms

Diplogastridae, formerly Diplogasteridae, are a family of nematodes (roundworms) known from a wide range of habitats, often in commensal or parasitic associations with insects.

== Description ==
Diplogastrid nematodes are characterized by a distinct "two-lobed" pharynx (hence their name from the Greek διπλόος = "double" and γαστήρ = "stomach"), the second (posterior) lobe being composed mostly of glandular tissue. Most known species also have at least one tooth, which has presumably allowed them to access many new food sources compared with the related nematodes of Rhabditidae (including Caenorhabditis elegans), most species of which feed on bacteria. Several diplogastrid species also have a polyphenism in their mouthparts, allowing resource specialization within species. The wide array of feeding modes in the Diplogastridae is reflected by the relatively high diversity and complexity of their mouth structures, which show accelerated rates of evolution in comparison with the Rhabditidae.

While Sudhaus and Lieven sunk many generic names in their lumping approach of a revision, the Hungarian nematologist Istvan Andrassy was a "splitter", erecting and re-erecting many nematode taxa. The truth might be somewhere in between, as the approaches by Ragsdale and others have shown in recent years.

Among the Diplogastridae is the nematode Pristionchus pacificus, a model organism for comparative developmental biology.

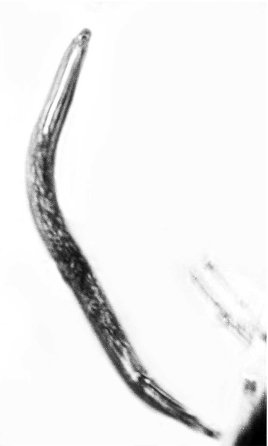
Formicodiplogaster myrmenema dauer juvenile in Dominican amber

== Genera ==
- Acrostichus
- Allodiplogaster
- Anchidiplogaster
- Butlerius
- Cephalobium
- Cutidiplogaster
- Demaniella
- Diplogaster
- Diplogasteriana
- Diplogasteroides
- Diplogastrellus
- Fictor
- †Formicodiplogaster (Fossil, Dominican Amber)
- Goffartia
- Heteropleuronema
- Hugotdiplogaster
- Koerneria
- Leptojacobus
- Levipalatum
- Longibucca
- Mehdinema
- Micoletzkya
- Mononchoides
- Oigolaimella
- Onthodiplogaster
- Neodiplogaster
- Parapristionchus
- Parasitodiplogaster
- Paroigolaimella
- Pristionchus
- Pseudodiplogasteroides
- Rhabditidoides
- Rhabditolaimus
- Sachsia
- Sudhausia
- Teratodiplogaster
- Tylopharynx
