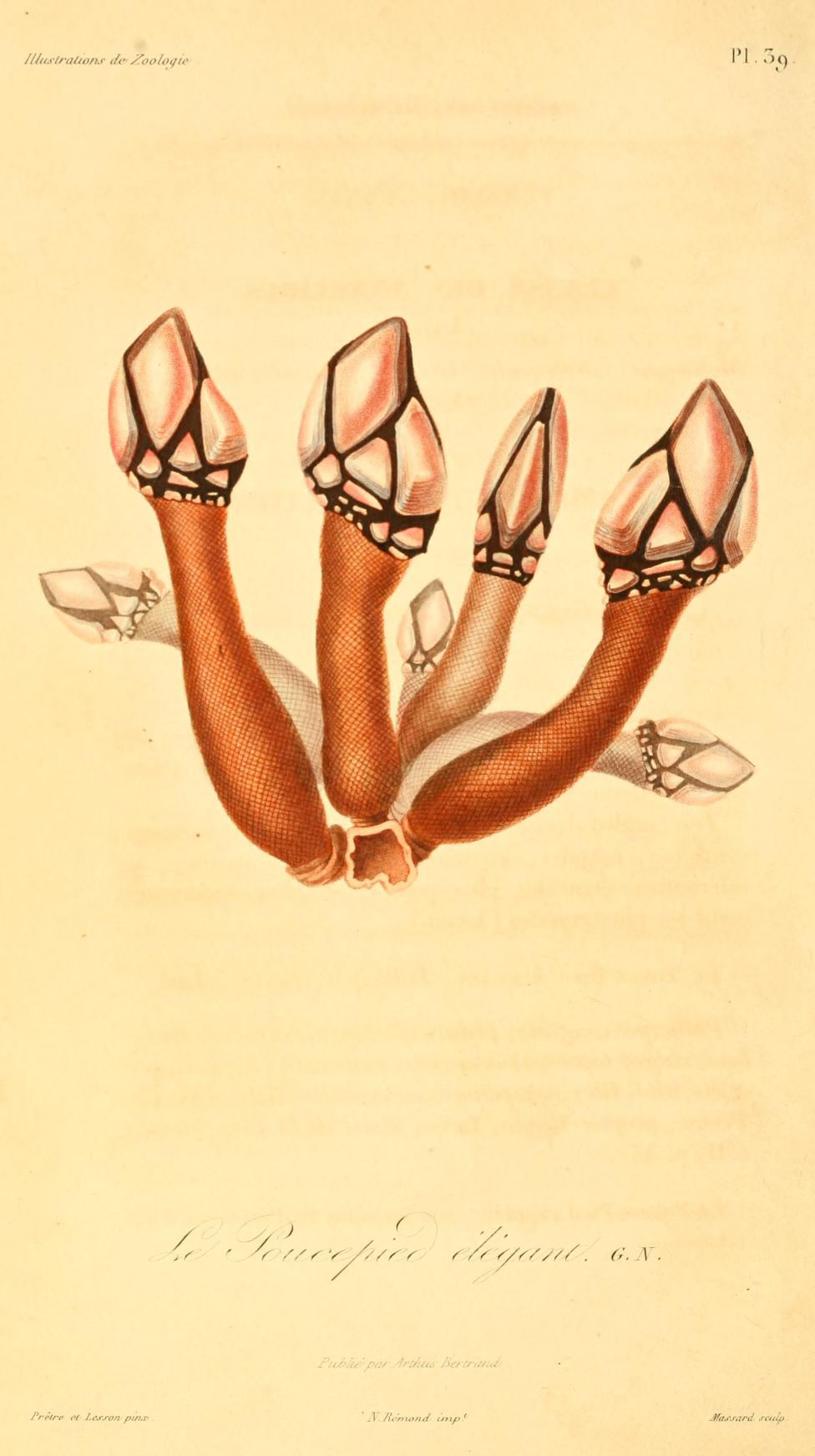
- Original drawing of Pollicipes elegans illustrated by René Lesson in 1831

Scientific classification
- Kingdom: Animalia
- Phylum: Arthropoda
- Clade: Pancrustacea
- Class: Thecostraca
- Subclass: Cirripedia
- Order: Pollicipedomorpha
- Family: Pollicipedidae
- Genus: Pollicipes
- Species: P. elegans

Binomial name
- Pollicipes elegans (René Lesson, 1831)

Synonyms
- Pollicipes rigidus Sowerby, 1839; Pollicipes ruber Sowerby, 1833

= Pollicipes elegans =

Species of barnacles

Pollicipes elegans, the Pacific goose barnacle, is a species of gooseneck barnacle inhabiting the tropical coastline of the eastern Pacific Ocean. Its habitat borders a close relative, Pollicipes polymerus, a gooseneck barnacle covering the coastline of the Pacific Northwest. Other species belonging to the genus Pollicipes are found along the eastern coastlines of the Atlantic Ocean.

== Description ==
Pollicipes elegans is a stalked marine organism characterized by having a plated capitulum shaped similar to a goose head. The capitulum consists of two hinged shells which will open for feeding and are held up by a scaled peduncle attached to substrate. Both the capitulum and stalk are red-orange. This coloring is shared with P. polymerus but in contrast to the eastern Atlantic species, Pollicipes pollicipes, which is consistent with gray and white based coloring. The scales of P. elegans are also long and narrow.

== Habitat and distribution ==
Covering the eastern tropical zone of the Pacific Ocean, Pollicipes elegans is found scattered across rocky intertidal zones. Habitats across the genus Pollicipes are generally similar, with clustered mounds of goose barnacles poking out from different substrates. These clusters are often attached to inverted rocks hanging above a tidal pool. The inversion allows the shell opening to protrude the water's surface below.

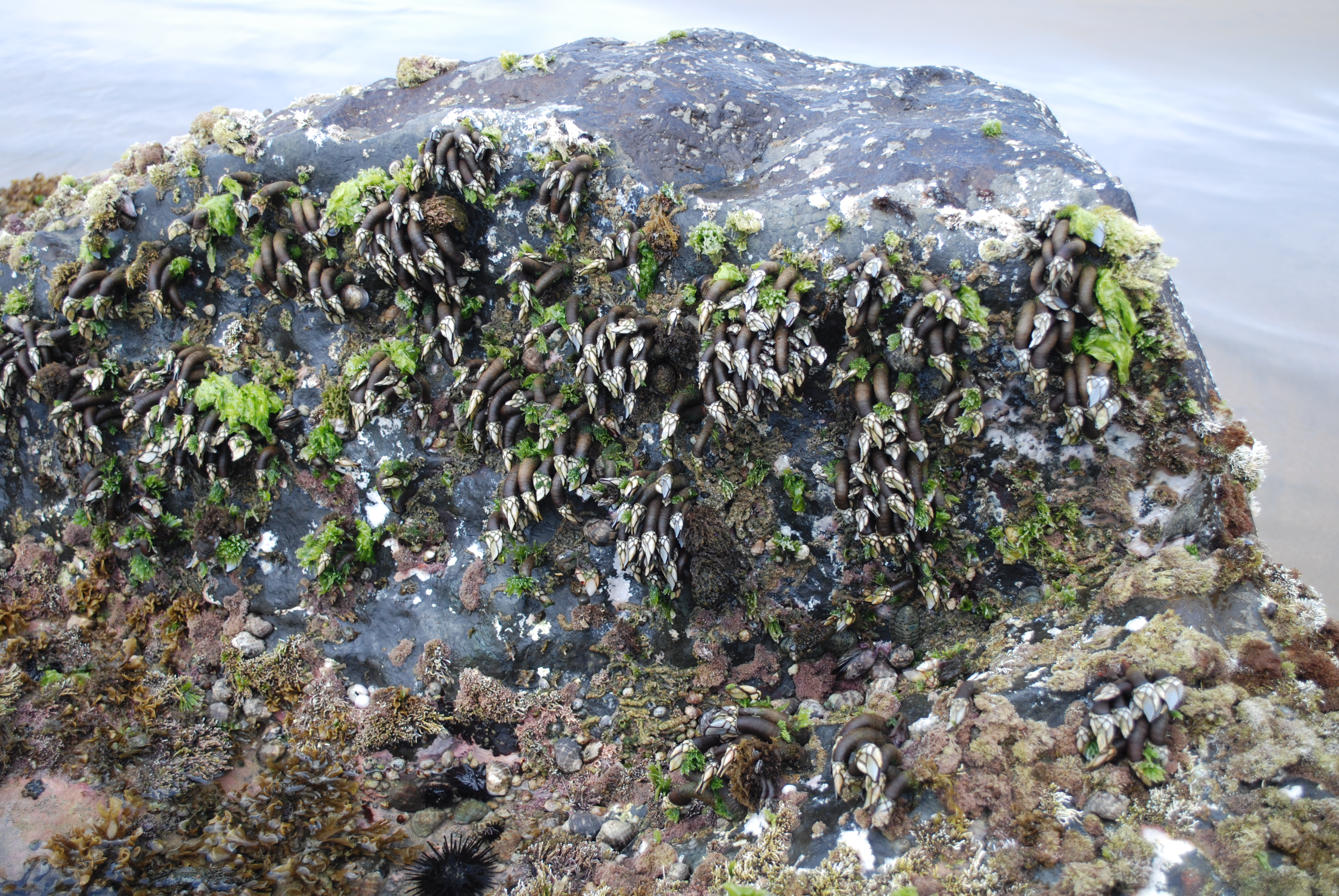
Clusters of genus Pollicipes on intertidal substrate

The species can be found along the Pacific coastlines of northern Mexico all the way down to the northern tip of Chile. However, there are stretches of coastline along Central America where increased atmosphere and water temperatures have prevented dispersal of P. elegans populations. Historical limitations similar to this, such as extreme cold or extreme hot climates, are what separated the original tropical population. Despite high temperatures, there are still strong populations in Costa Rica and El Salvador. The species is also known for overlapping habitats of P. polymerus throughout southern regions of California.

Though barnacle-type organisms are typically found on the hulls of ships or floating decks, P. elegans does not commonly exhibit this behavior.

== Life history ==
There are four total species in the genus Pollicipes spread about the eastern coastlines of the Pacific and Atlantic Oceans. The closest extinct relative, Pollicipes aboriginalis, resided in western regions of Australia, inhabiting an eastern coastline of the Indian Ocean. Beyond that is a Tethyan relict whose distribution bordered the current genus's fossil records. The current population of goose barnacles was once a much larger and sound population of sea fauna from the Tethys Ocean, with Pollicipes polymerus branching off from the population before new species emerged. P. elegans, P. pollicipes, and P. caboverdensis are more closely related to one another than they are to P. polymerus.

== Reproduction ==
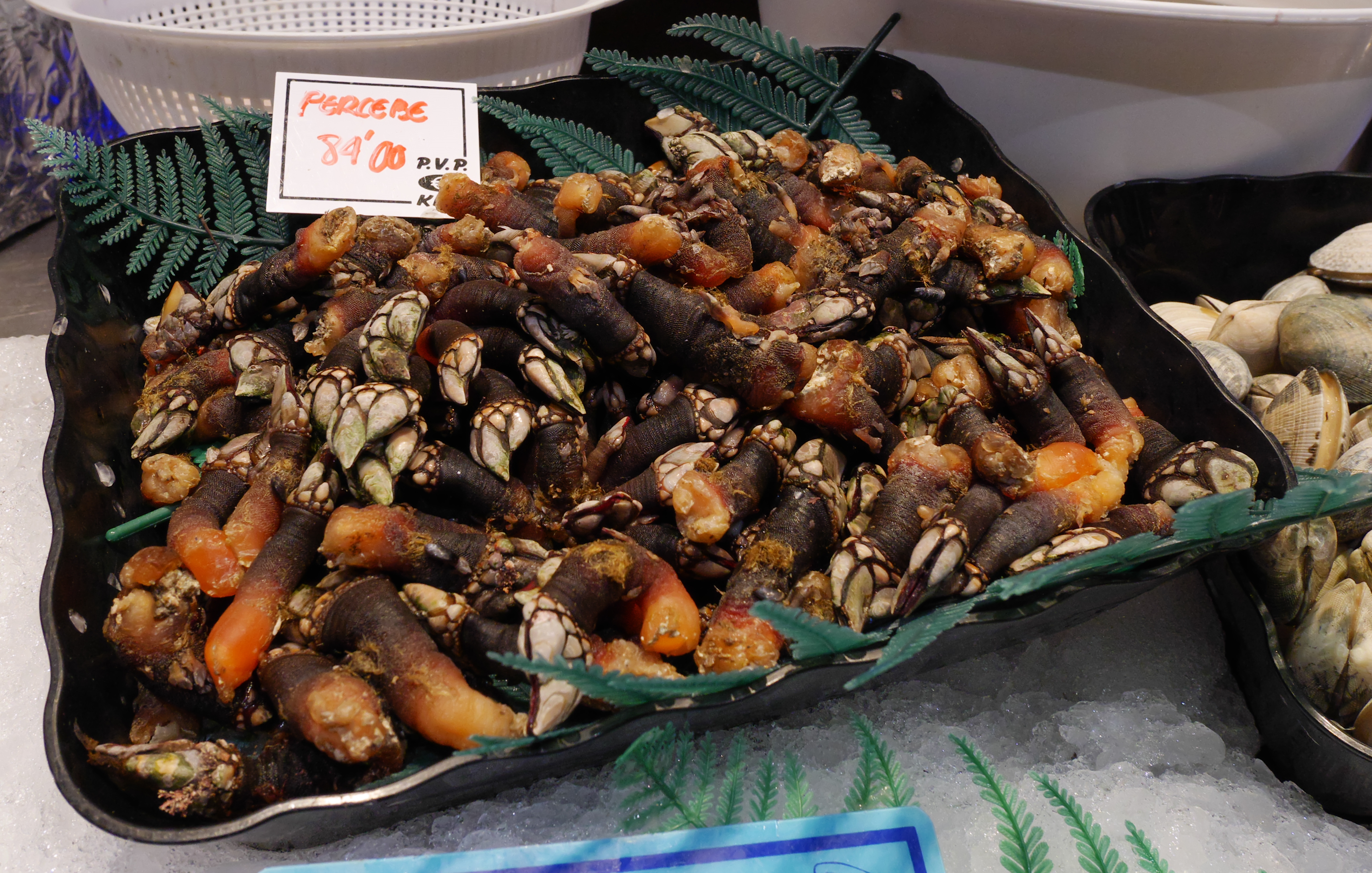
Percebes (P. pollicipes) being sold in a Galician market

Similar to its relatives, P. elegans is a hermaphroditic organism. In spite of this and because of the colonies' high density, the species also experiences high polyandry with some spawn groups having up to five participating males. The purpose is to either make up for a smaller population or to ensure the fertilization of future offspring.

== Spanish delicacy ==
Historically, California's indigenous people were known to cook and consume the peduncle of Mitella polymerus, which is now known as Pollicipes polymerus. Though the Pacific goose barnacle itself is known for being edible, it is not commonly served today in North, Central, or South America. The entire organism cannot be consumed whole because of the hard shell of the capitulum and the leathery skin of the stalk, both must be removed completely for consumption. In Galicia, P. pollicipes is known as percebes, a delicacy boiled and served whole on a dish.
