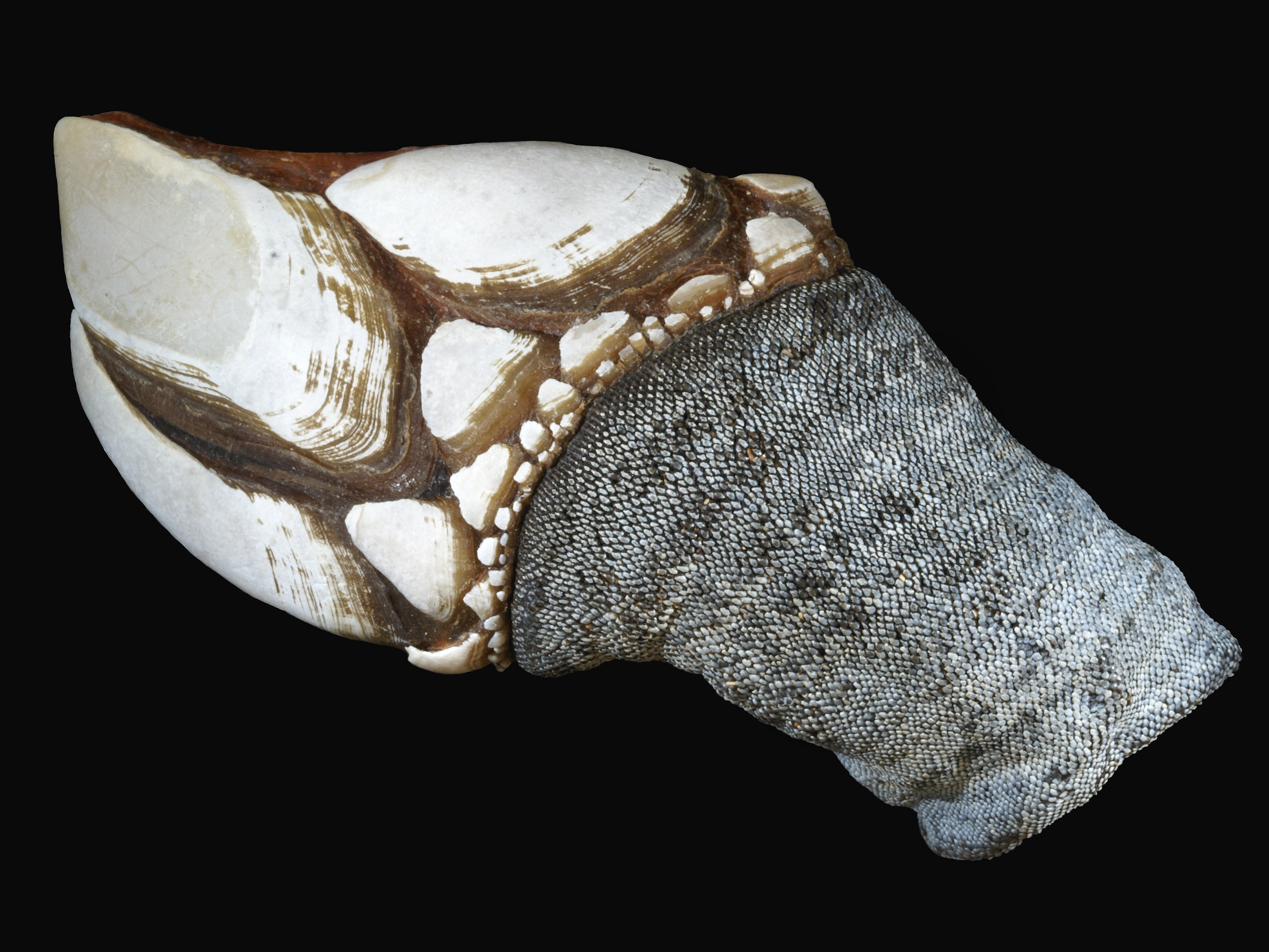

Scientific classification
- Kingdom: Animalia
- Phylum: Arthropoda
- Clade: Pancrustacea
- Class: Thecostraca
- Subclass: Cirripedia
- Order: Pollicipedomorpha
- Family: Pollicipedidae
- Genus: Pollicipes
- Species: P. pollicipes

Binomial name
- Pollicipes pollicipes (Gmelin, 1789)
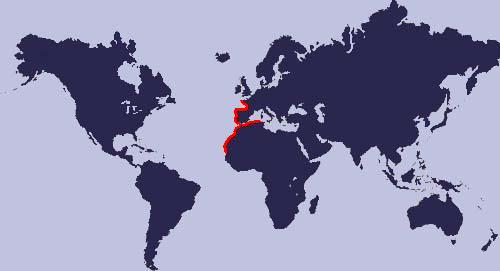
- Range of P. pollicipes shown in red

Synonyms
- Lepas gallorum Spengler, 1790; Lepas pollicipes Gmelin, 1789; Mitella pollicipes (Gmelin, 1789); Pollicipes cornucopia Leach, 1817

= Pollicipes pollicipes =

Species of barnacle

Pollicipes pollicipes, known as the goose neck barnacle, goose barnacle or leaf barnacle is a species of goose barnacle, also well known under the taxonomic synonym Pollicipes cornucopia. It is closely related to Pollicipes polymerus, a species with the same common names, but found on the Pacific coast of North America, and to Pollicipes elegans a species from the coast of Chile. It is found on rocky shores in the north-east Atlantic Ocean and is prized as a delicacy, especially in the Iberian Peninsula.

== Distribution ==
Pollicipes pollicipes is chiefly distributed from 48°N to 28°N, along the coasts of France, Spain (including the Canary Islands), Portugal, Morocco, and south to Senegal. The periphery of the species' range also extends as far north as Ireland, with outlying populations on the south coast of England and possibly in southwestern Ireland, although there are no recent records there. The species is present, but rare, in the Mediterranean Sea. It is possible that the outlying populations are not self-sustaining, being instead maintained by immigration of larvae from self-sustaining core populations.

A population disjunctly located around the tropical Cape Verde Islands at about 16°N was described in 2010 as a new species, Pollicipes caboverdensis.

== Ecology ==
Pollicipes pollicipes grows in groups on rocks, as well as on the hulls of shipwrecks and on driftwood. It is a filter feeder, living on particles that it can glean from the water passing over its extended cirri; these possess a complex assortment of setae, enabling P. pollicipes to have a varied diet, including diatoms, detritus, large crustaceans, copepods, shrimp and molluscs.

The larvae pass through seven free-swimming stages (six nauplii and one cypris) over the course of at least a month. After this time, they settle into the adult, sessile form.

Pollicipes pollicipes is harvested for consumption in many parts of its range, mostly for the Spanish market, where (marketed as percebe gallego) it may sell for as much as €90 per kilogram. As a result, the species is thought to be in decline. It is harvested manually, and archaeological evidence suggests that the species has been harvested in this way for over 10,000 years.

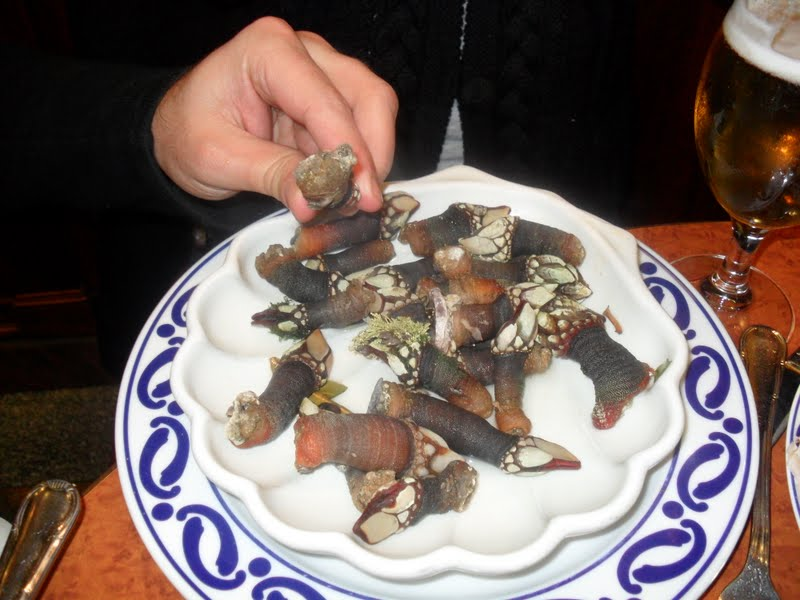
Goose neck barnacles as served in a Madrid restaurant
