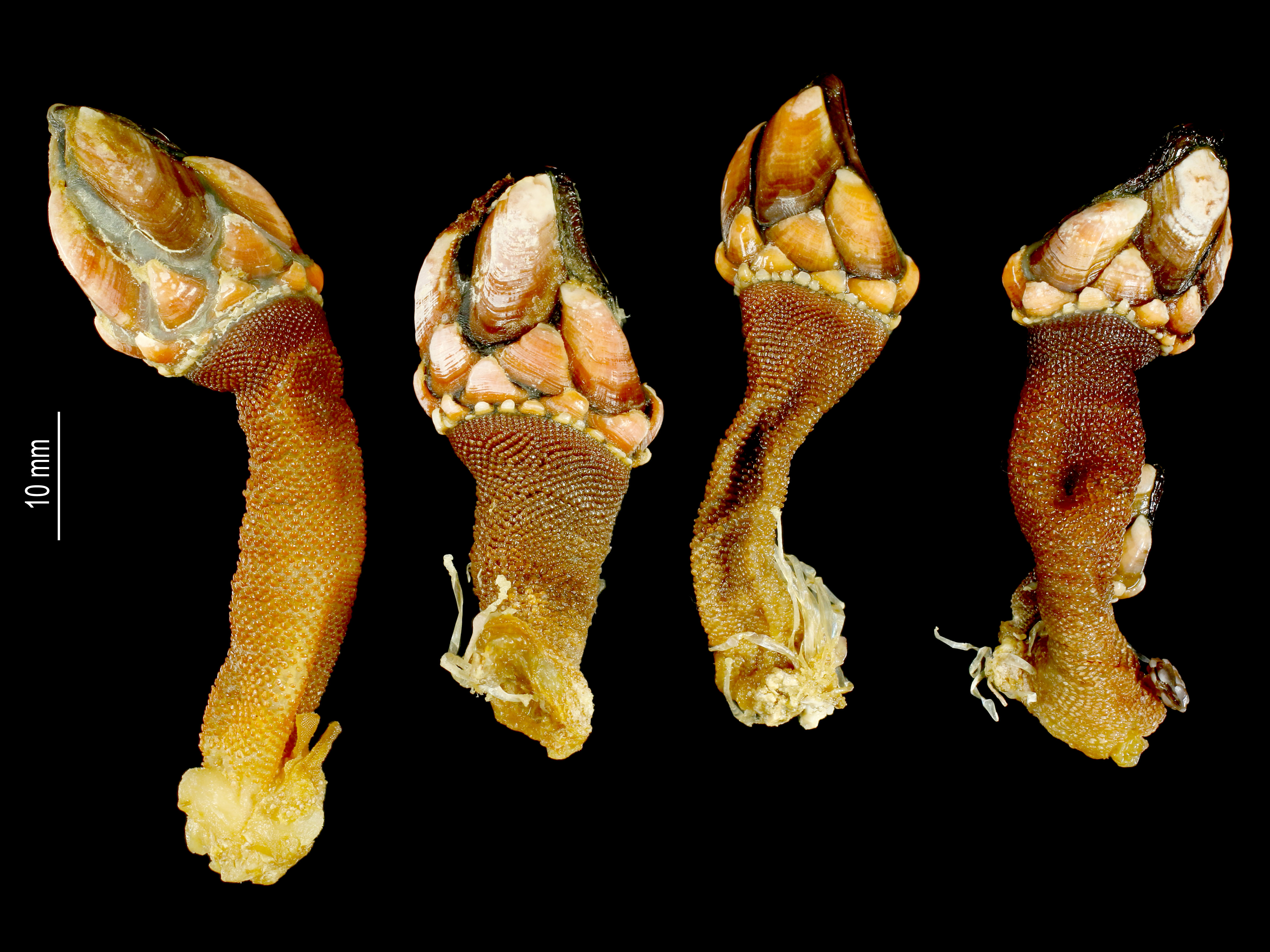
- Pollicipes caboverdensis

Scientific classification
- Domain: Eukaryota
- Kingdom: Animalia
- Phylum: Arthropoda
- Class: Thecostraca
- Subclass: Cirripedia
- Order: Pollicipedomorpha
- Family: Pollicipedidae
- Genus: Pollicipes
- Species: P. caboverdensis

Binomial name
- Pollicipes caboverdensis Fernandes, Cruz & Van Syoc, 2010

= Pollicipes caboverdensis =

Species of barnacle

Pollicipes caboverdensis is a species of goose barnacle in the family Pollicipedidae. It is found in rocky intertidal zones on the coasts of the islands Santiago, Sal and São Vicente, Cape Verde. The species was first described by Joana N. Fernandes, Teresa Cruz and Robert Van Syoc in 2010 after a 24.5 mm specimen collected from Ponta Preta, northwestern Santiago.
