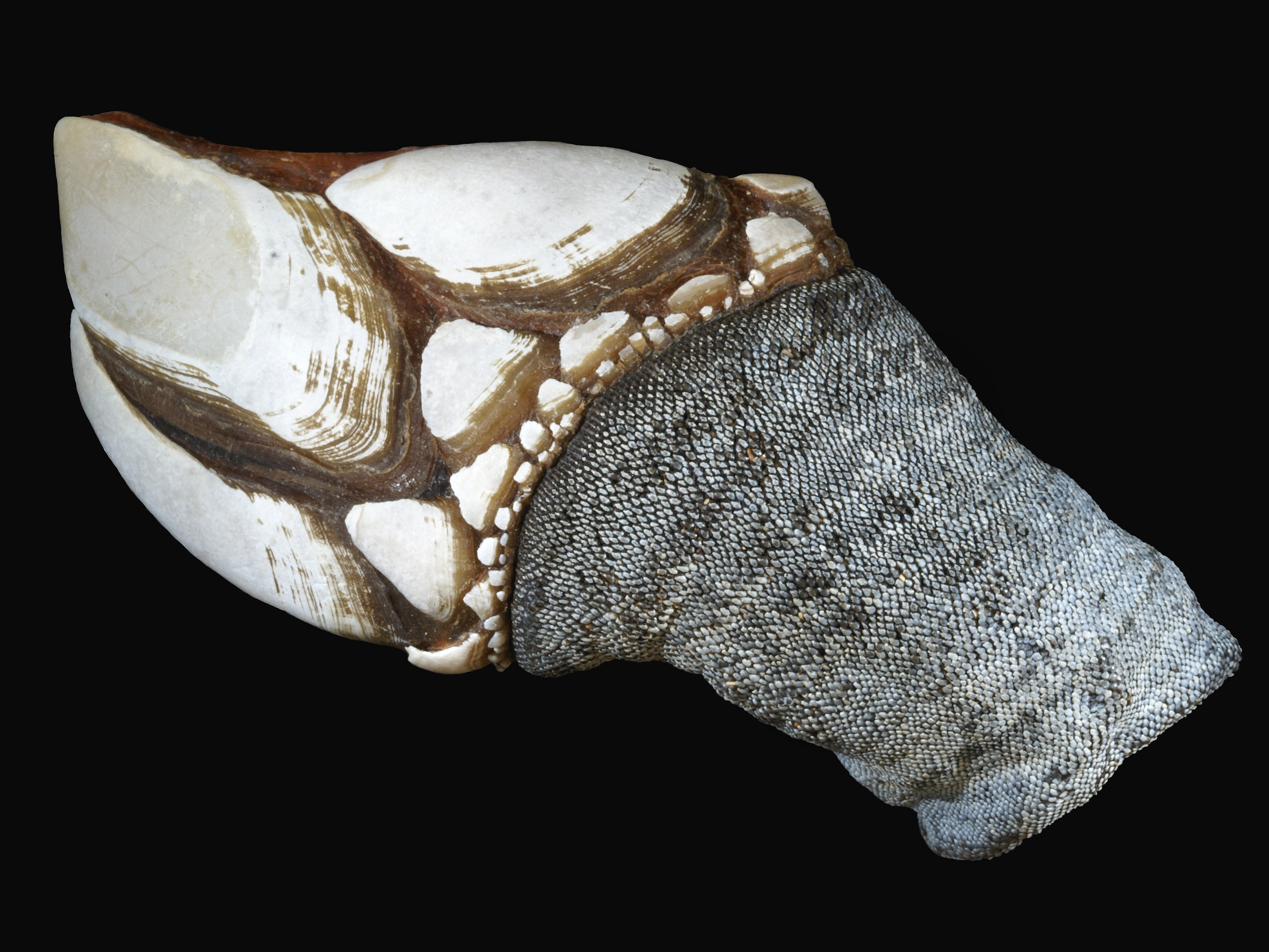
- Pollicipes pollicipes

Scientific classification
- Kingdom: Animalia
- Phylum: Arthropoda
- Class: Thecostraca
- Subclass: Cirripedia
- Order: Pollicipedomorpha
- Family: Pollicipedidae
- Genus: Pollicipes; Leach, 1817

= Pollicipes =

Genus of barnacles

Pollicipes is a genus of goose barnacles, first described by William Elford Leach in 1817. It comprises four species of marine suspension-feeders.

== Species ==
These species belong to the genus Pollicipes:

- Pollicipes caboverdensis Fernandes, Cruz & Van Syoc, 2010
- Pollicipes elegans (Lesson, 1831) (Pacific goose barnacle)
- Pollicipes pollicipes (Gmelin, 1791 [in Gmelin, 1788-1792]) (goose barnacle)
- Pollicipes polymerus Sowerby, 1833 (gooseneck barnacle)
