= Anelasma (disambiguation) =

Anelasma may refer to:

- Anelasma, a monotypic genus of parasitic goose barnacles
- Anelasma Miers, a genus of flowering plants, now synonymized with Abuta.
