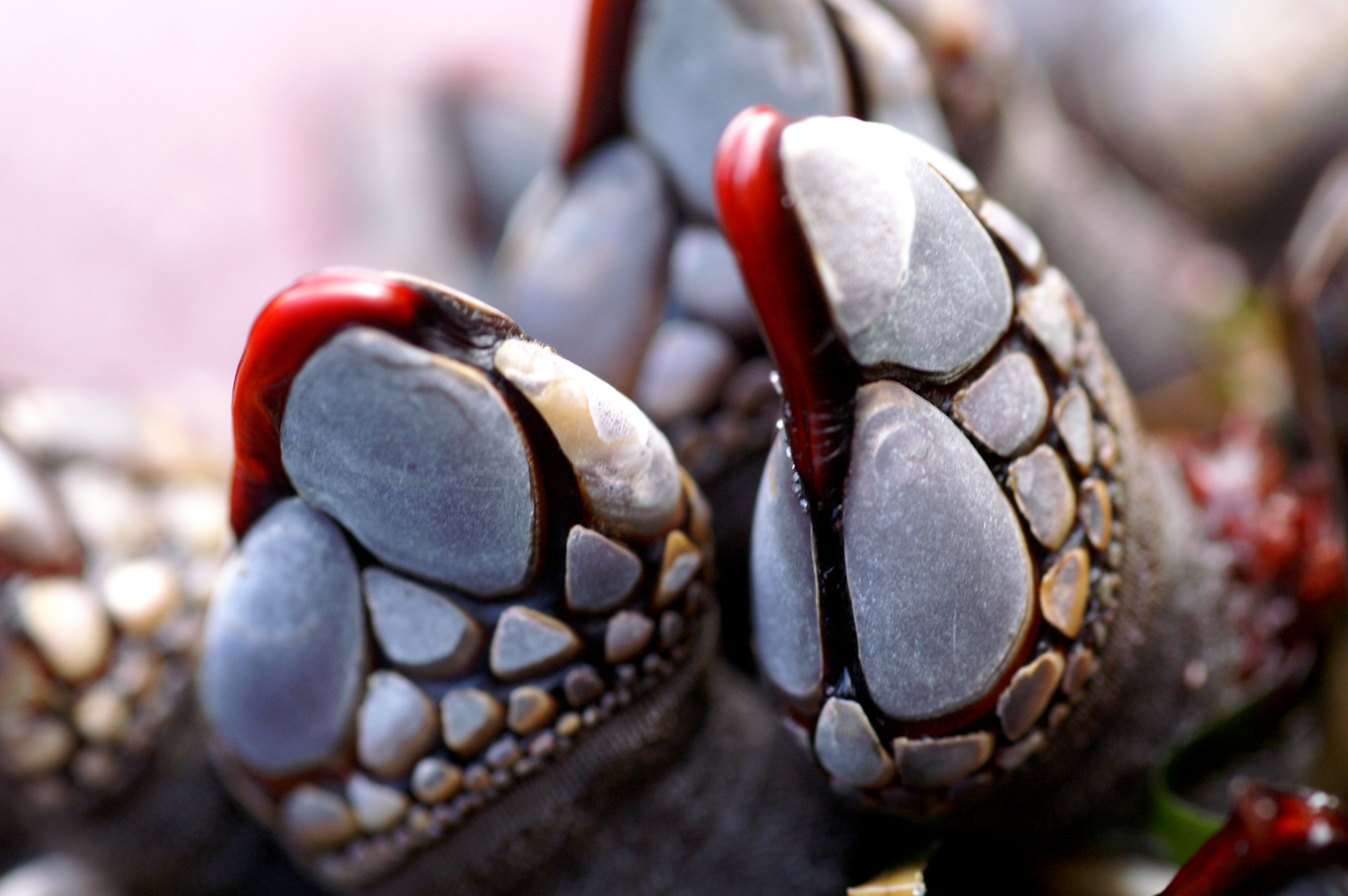

Scientific classification
- Kingdom: Animalia
- Phylum: Arthropoda
- Clade: Pancrustacea
- Class: Thecostraca
- Subclass: Cirripedia
- Order: Pollicipedomorpha
- Family: Pollicipedidae
- Genus: Pollicipes
- Species: P. polymerus

Binomial name
- Pollicipes polymerus (Sowerby III, 1883)

Synonyms
- Mitella polymerus

= Pollicipes polymerus =

Species of barnacle

Pollicipes polymerus, commonly known as the gooseneck barnacle or leaf barnacle, is a species of stalked barnacle. It is found, often in great numbers, on rocky shores on the Pacific coasts of North America.

It is a natural food resource for indigenous coastal peoples of central California, who cook them in hot ashes.

== Classification ==
Barnacles are classified with shrimps, crabs, isopods and amphipods in the subphylum Crustacea. They are included in the class Maxillopoda, though this class does not appear to be a monophyletic grouping. They are included in the infraclass Cirripedia, the barnacles, members of which are sessile suspension feeders with two active swimming larval stages, the nauplius and the cyprid. The order Pedunculata includes barnacles attached to the substrate by stalks, the goose barnacles. The attachment is made by the cementing of the antennules of the cyprid larvae to the substrate and the elongation of that region into a stalk. Pedunculata is not itself a single monophyletic group but forms a transitional series of lineages moving towards the sessile acorn barnacles. Pollicipes polymerus is included in the family Pollicipedidae.

== Description ==
Pollicipes polymerus is attached to rocks or other objects by a strong, rubbery stalk, the peduncle, which is up to 10 centimetres (4 in) long. It has a muscular interior and the leathery surface is covered in bands of minute spiny scales on short stalks. The capitulum, at the end of the peduncle, is up to 5 centimetres (2 in) long and contains the rest of the body including all the limbs and other appendages except the first pair of antennae. The outside of the capitulum bears five strengthening calcareous plates corresponding with the plates that protect an acorn barnacle. The largest of these is the carina, on the morphologically dorsal side of the capitulum, with a pair of smaller scuta and terga on either side below. Further calcification occurs from other centres on the capitulum with the formation of many small scales. The thoracic crustacean appendages are modified into feather-like cirri. They project through the aperture at the end of the capitulum and are used for feeding.

== Distribution and habitat ==
Pollicipes polymerus is found in the north eastern Pacific Ocean, its range extending from southern Alaska to Baja California. It occurs on rocky coasts in the intertidal zone and favours exposed areas where there is much wave action. It tends to occur in closely associated groups and is often abundant.

== Reproduction ==
Pollicipes polymerus is a hermaphrodite. Reproduction takes place during the summer and there may be several broods per year. The ovaries are in the upper part of the peduncle and liberate from 104,000 to 240,000 eggs at a time into the mantle cavity. Here they stick together to form egg masses. The numerous small testes lie alongside the gut. Sperm from these is passed along the extensible penis into the mantle cavity of an adjoining individual where fertilisation takes place. Self-fertilisation does not seem to occur and any individual that is more than 20 cm (8 in) from its nearest neighbour is effectively sterile. The eggs are brooded for 3 to 4 weeks until they hatch into nauplius larvae and are liberated into the sea. There they become planktonic and feed on phytoplankton. They grow and undergo 6 moults in about 40 days before becoming non-feeding cyprid larvae. These search out suitable places to settle where they undergo metamorphosis and attach themselves permanently to the substrate. They do this by secreting a strong adhesive substance from glands on the antennules. Settlement is stimulated by the presence of peduncles of other gooseneck barnacles, and may take place on the peduncles themselves.

== Ecology ==
Pollicipes polymerus is an omnivore. It feeds by extending its cirri through the aperture at the end of the capitulum and unfurling them. The posterior three pairs are biramous and form a net to trap particles. They are held at a suitable angle to intercept moving water and are periodically withdrawn into the capitulum with any food items that have been trapped. Here particles are scraped off by the other three, shorter pairs of cirri which have overlapping setae (bristles). The particles are then transported to the mouth where they are manipulated and sorted into edible and inedible items by the maxillae, mandibles and palps. This may be done with the help of chemoreceptors found on the appendages and near the mouth. Examination of the animal's gut contents show that it feeds on copepods, amphipods, barnacle larvae, small clams, polychaete worms and hydrozoans as well as detritus and algae. Predators on gooseneck barnacles include the glaucous-winged gull (Larus glaucescens), the black oystercatcher (Haematopus bachmani), the ochre sea star (Pisaster ochraceus) and the six-rayed star (Leptasterias hexactis).

A research study undertaken by Robert T. Paine in Makah Bay, Washington State in 1966 showed the importance of predators in maintaining a biodiverse community. Paine excluded the ochre sea star from an area of seabed where gooseneck barnacles and sea mussels (Mytilus californianus) predominated and found that the number of invertebrate species associated with them fell from fifteen to eight. Paine proposed the hypothesis that "Local species diversity is directly related to the efficiency with which predators prevent the monopolization of the major environmental requisites by one species".

The distribution of both gooseneck barnacles and sea mussels is quite patchy. In an effort to understand this better, another study, undertaken by Wootton in 1994, excluded birds from an area where these two species were found on Tatoosh Island, Washington. In a carefully designed series of experiments he recorded the direct and indirect results on the numbers of goose barnacles, sea mussels, acorn barnacles, starfish and predatory whelks (Nucella spp.) present in the area. His results demonstrated the important part that predation by birds can play in the dynamics of gooseneck barnacle populations.

Gooseneck barnacles compete with a number of other organisms in a complex struggle for survival in the limited available space in their rocky intertidal habitat. The first colonisers of bare rock are usually annual algae, soon to be followed by perennial species including coralline algae. Gooseneck barnacles, sea mussels and several species of acorn barnacles soon follow. Further competition is provided by sea palms, the large holdfasts of which may smother or squeeze out the molluscs and barnacles. Sea palms may settle on the mussels and may be carried away in storms, taking the mussels with them. Gooseneck barnacles may limit the colonisation of mussel recruits by feeding on their larvae. In areas where gooseneck barnacles predominate they may dominate until some are swept away in storms and allow in other species. In the long term, the mussels usually come to dominate as their byssal threads are able to overgrow all the other sessile organisms.
