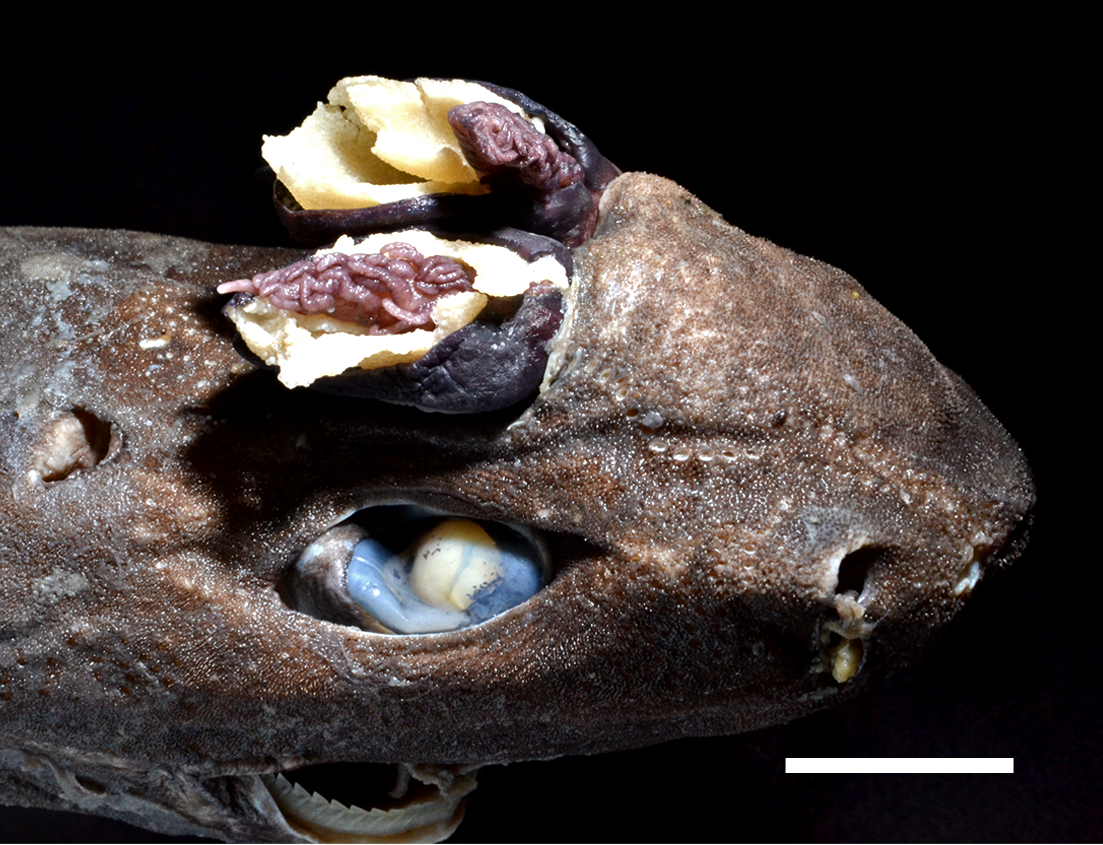
- Two Anelasma attached to the lanternshark Etmopterus compagnoi

Scientific classification
- Kingdom: Animalia
- Phylum: Arthropoda
- Clade: Pancrustacea
- Class: Thecostraca
- Subclass: Cirripedia
- Order: Pollicipedomorpha
- Family: Pollicipedidae
- Genus: Anelasma; Darwin, 1851
- Species: A. squalicola

Binomial name
- Anelasma squalicola Darwin, 1851

Synonyms
- Alepas squalicola Lovén, 1844

= Anelasma =

Species of parasitic barnacles that attack sharks

Anelasma is a monotypic genus of goose barnacles that live as parasites on various shark hosts.

== Taxonomy ==
The genus Anelasma contains a single species, Anelasma squalicola. The nominal species, however, has a very broad distribution and may in fact be a species complex that contain several undescribed species.

It has been suggested that Anelasma diverged from the ancestor it shares with its current closest relatives (the free-living, suspension-feeding species in the genera Capitulum and Pollicipes) a long time ago. The species may represent the only remaining representative of a previously more numerous clade that made the evolutionary transition from filter-feeding to parasitism.

== Description ==
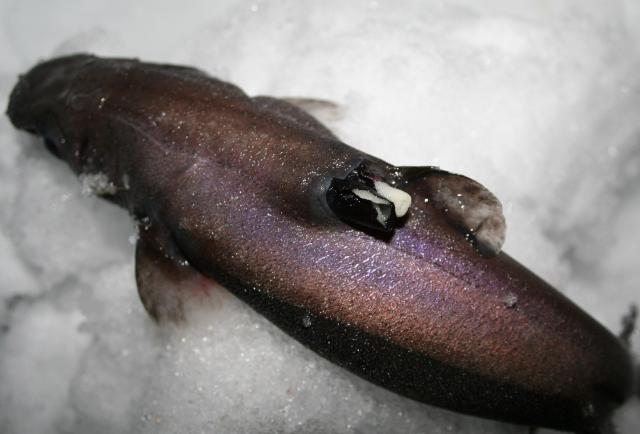
Velvet belly lanternshark with Anelasma

This barnacle reaches a length of approximately 25 mm. Unlike most barnacles, it has no shell; the outermost integument is its tough, purplish-black mantle, without any calcareous plates. The body protrudes from the skin of its host and is usually encountered in pairs. The cirri, normally used by barnacles for filtering food items out of the water, are vestigial, being small and unbranched, and have lost their feeding function. Nutrition is instead extracted from the host through hidden tendrils that extend downwards from the base.

== Distribution ==
The species is widespread in deeper waters (samples off South Africa have been obtained from ~650 m) and occurs on a variety of shark species. Records are known from cold waters off Greenland, Britain, New Zealand, Chile and South Africa, as well as warmer waters off Spain, the Canary Islands, Australia, and in the Gulf of Mexico.

== Ecology ==
Anelasma are mesoparasitic barnacles that can be found attached to several species of deep-sea squaloid sharks, including at least black dogfish (Centroscyllium fabricii), combtooth dogfish (Centroscyllium nigrum), velvet belly lanternshark (Etmopterus spinax), fringefin lanternshark (E. schultzi), great lanternshark (E. princeps), brown lanternshark (E. unicolor), and southern lanternshark (E. granulosus). Anelasma are partially embedded in the flesh of the host, and seem to retard sexual development of their hosts, apparently castrating them.
