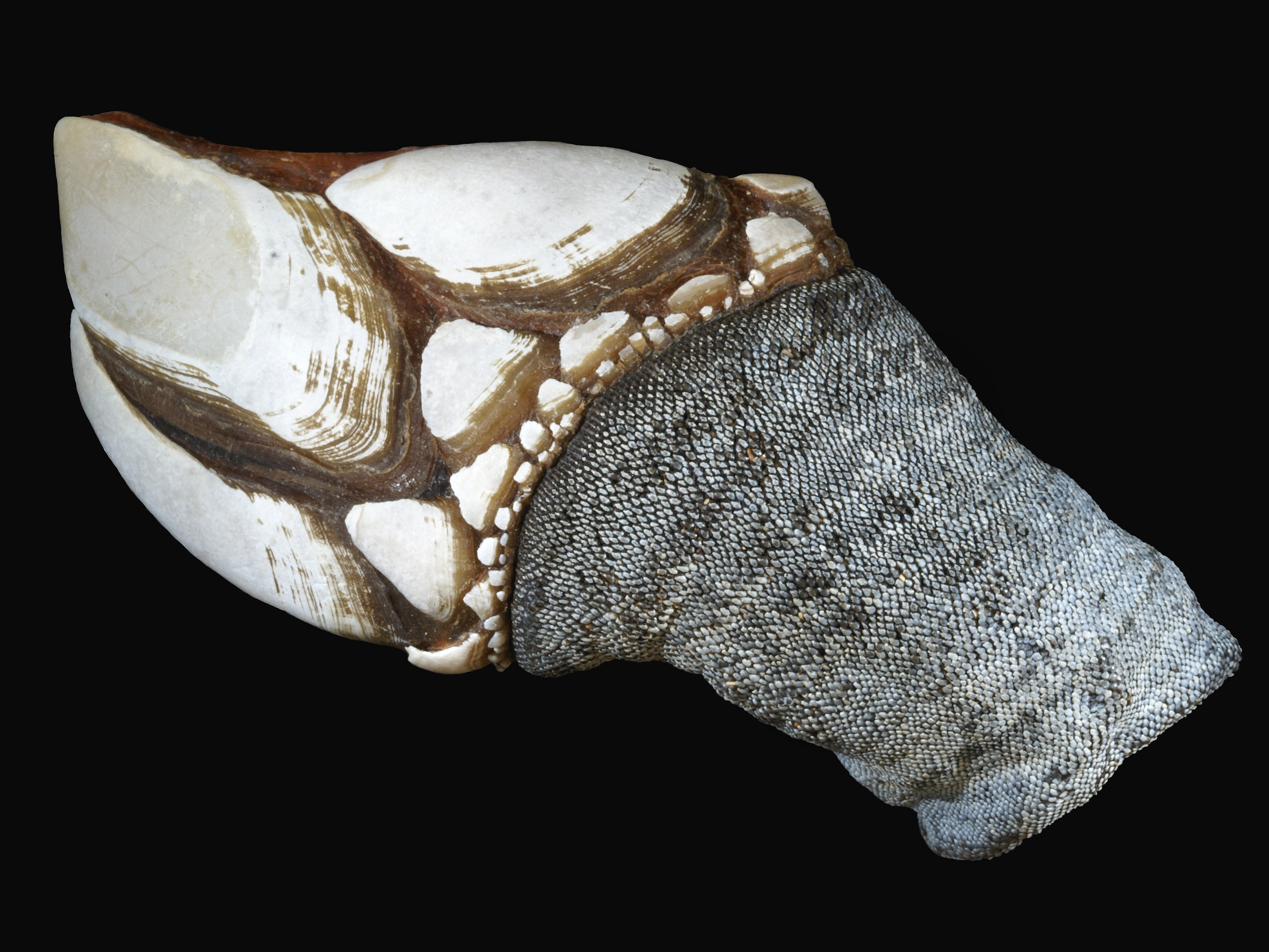
- Pollicipes pollicipes

Scientific classification
- Kingdom: Animalia
- Phylum: Arthropoda
- Clade: Pancrustacea
- Class: Thecostraca
- Subclass: Cirripedia
- Order: Pollicipedomorpha
- Family: Pollicipedidae; Leach, 1817

= Pollicipedidae =

Family of barnacles

Pollicipedidae is a family of goose barnacles.

== Genera ==
These genera belong to the family Pollicipedidae:

- Anelasma Darwin, 1852
- Capitulum Gray, 1825
- Pollicipes Leach, 1817
