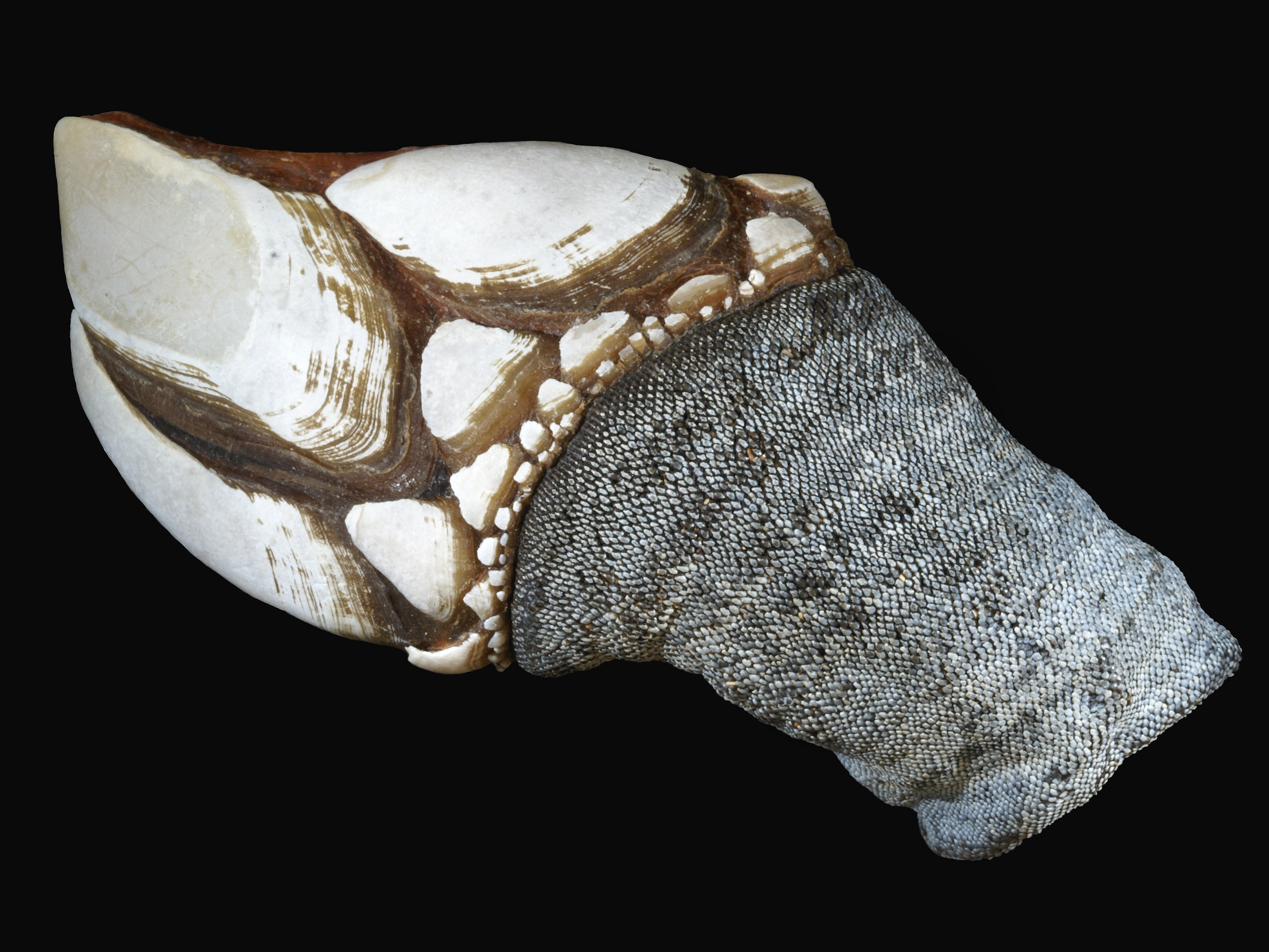
- Pollicipes pollicipes

Scientific classification
- Kingdom: Animalia
- Phylum: Arthropoda
- Clade: Pancrustacea
- Class: Thecostraca
- Subclass: Cirripedia
- Infraclass: Thoracica; Lamarck, 1818

= Goose barnacle =

Type of barnacle

Goose barnacles or stalked barnacles are any of several species of filter-feeding crustaceans characterized by a fleshy stalk of which one end is connected to an armored capitulum and the other end is used by the animal to attach to substrates such as intertidal rocks, flotsam or larger animals.

Their resemblance of appendages of other species has earned this form of barnacle an array of common names. In Iberia, the species Pollicipes pollicipes is culinarily important and is called percebes (sing. percebe), derived from the Early Medieval Latin words for thumb and foot. The closely related P. polymerus is known in its North American range as gooseneck or leaf barnacle. The species eaten by people in Asia, Capitulum mitella, is known in Japan as turtle hand barnacle (亀の手 or カメノテ), while Chinese vernacular alludes to the legs or claws of crabs (石蜐), turtles (龟足) and dogs (狗爪), the comb of chickens (鸡冠), and the hands of Buddha (佛手) or Guanyin (观音掌).

== Classification ==
Goose barnacles have been classified across multiple orders of the infraclass Thoracica along with acorn barnacles. They had been grouped into the taxonomic order Pedunculata, until research beginning in the 1960s and chiefly led by William A. Newton found the group to be polyphyletic.

== Biology ==
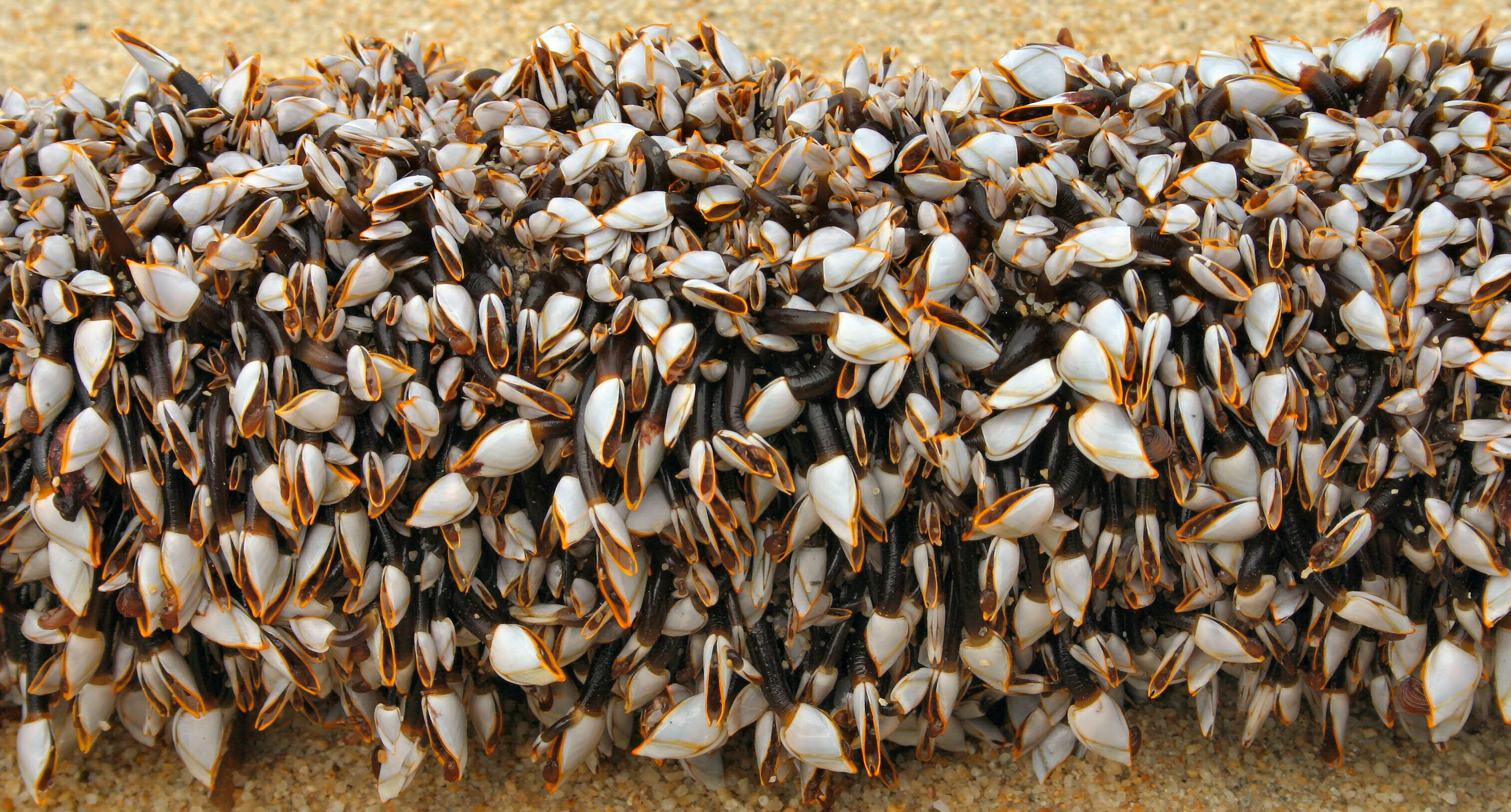
Lepas anatifera in Thailand

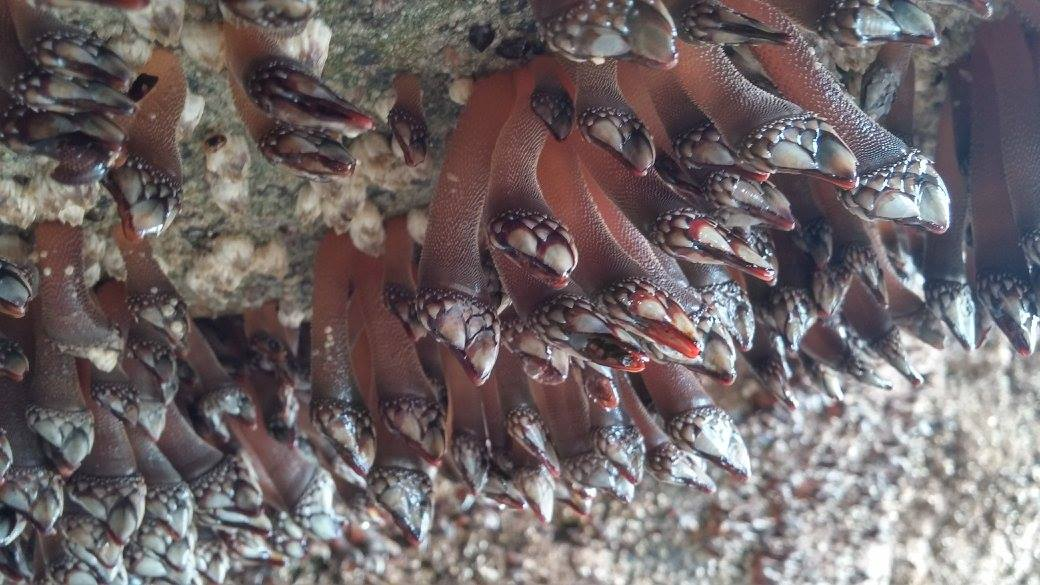
Gooseneck barnacles reaching down from the top of a tidal cave in Oregon

Like all barnacles, stalked species begin life with two distinct planktonic larval stages, after which they permanently attach themselves to various substrates with adhesive secreted from their characteristic stalks. The buoy barnacle Dosima fascicularis is an exception, as adults sometimes detach after metamorphosis and drift freely on floats formed by their own foamy secretions, sometimes in aggregations of many individuals.

Various species prefer different substrates. The Pollicipes and Capitulum species consumed by humans as mentioned above all select intertidal rocks. Unlike most other types of barnacles, these species depend on water motion rather than the movement of their cirri for feeding, so are found only on exposed or moderately exposed coasts.

Other goose barnacle species, including most in the family Lepadidae are flexible to select substrates opportunistically, which gives them pelagic, cosmopolitan distribution. Humans most frequently encounter pelagic species such as Lepas anatifera on tidewrack on oceanic coasts.

The parasitic Anelasma squalicola is another exception to the patterns above, lacking both a hard shell and the feeding function of its cirri. It instead embeds into the flesh of several species of deep-sea squaloid sharks, extracting nutrition from its host.

== Spontaneous generation ==
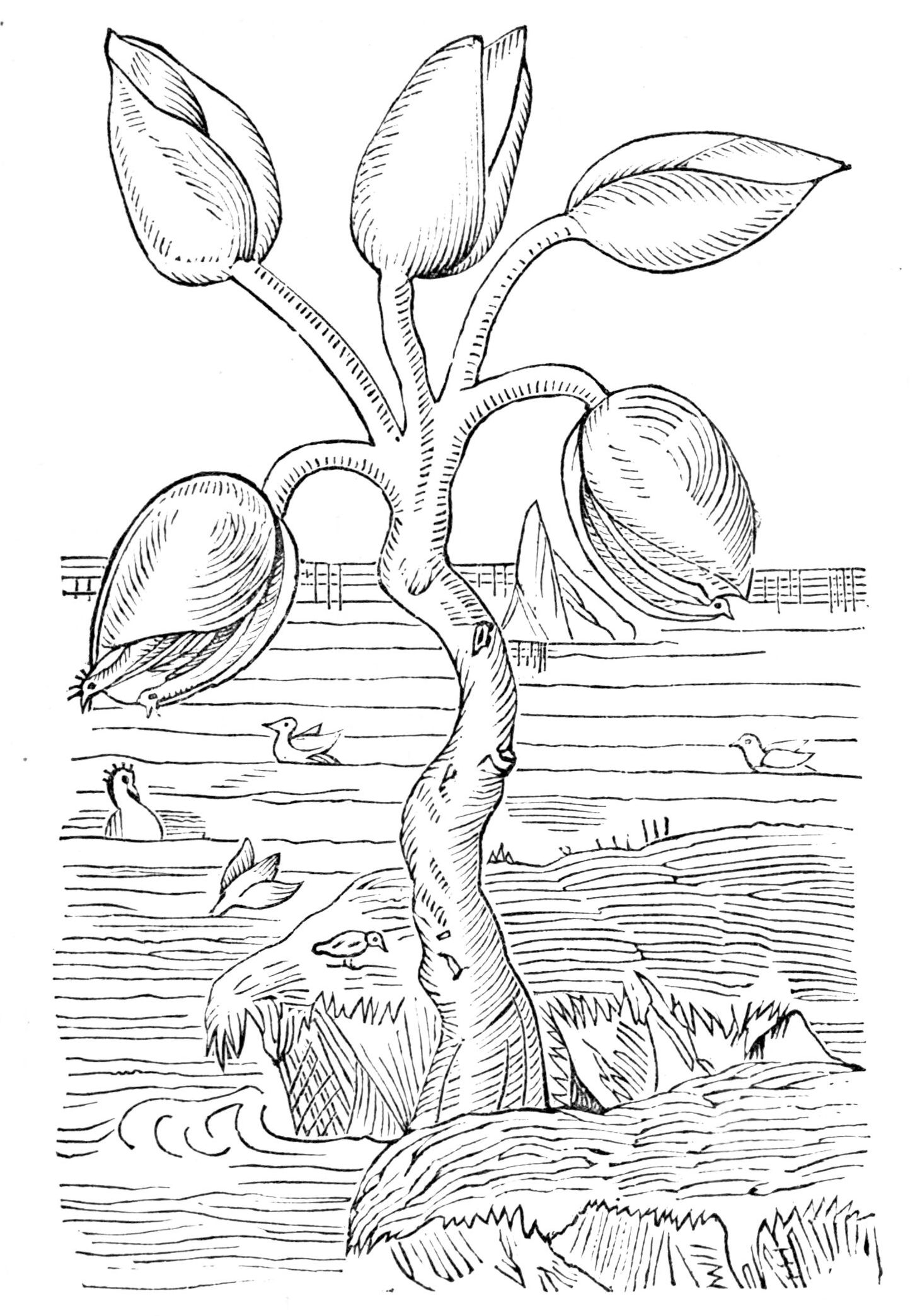
"The goose-tree" from Gerard's Herbal (1597), displaying the belief that goose barnacles produced barnacle geese.

In the days before birds were known to migrate, barnacle geese, Branta leucopsis, were thought to have developed from this crustacean through spontaneous generation, since they were never seen to nest in temperate Europe, hence the English names "goose barnacle" and "barnacle goose", and the scientific name Lepas anserifera (Latin: anser, "goose"). The confusion was prompted by their similarities in colour and shape. Because they were often found on driftwood, Gerald of Wales surmised that the barnacles were attached to fir timber branches before they fell in the water. The archdeacon of Brecon, Gerald of Wales, made this claim in his Topographia Hiberniae.

Since barnacle geese were thought to be "neither flesh, nor born of flesh", they were allowed to be eaten on days when eating meat was forbidden by some Christian churches, though it was not universally accepted. Holy Roman Emperor Frederick II examined barnacles and noted no evidence of any bird-like embryo in them, and the secretary of Lev of Rožmitál wrote a very skeptical account of his reaction to being served the goose at a fast-day dinner in 1456.

== Biomedical research ==
One component of L. anatifera that continues to be researched today is the adhesive properties of its secretion. Following an observational study regarding the adhesive properties of goose barnacle, its adhesive gland cells were located inside the muscle layer on the back side of the main stalk (peduncle). These glands secrete protein-based adhesive to make attaching the barnacles to fixed or mobile entities possible. This research in the barnacle adhesive serves as inspiration to the healthcare community to conduct their own research in an attempt to improve medical adhesive.

== As food ==
In Portugal and Spain, P. pollicipes is a widely consumed and expensive delicacy known as percebes, which are harvested manually at great risk by percebeiros on the northern Iberian coast, mainly in Galicia and Asturias, and on the southwestern Portuguese coast (Alentejo), as well as imported from other countries within its range of distribution, particularly from Morocco. A larger species (P. polymerus) was also exported from Canada, until the Department of Fisheries and Oceans closed this fishery on 31 May 1999.

In Spain, percebes are lightly boiled in brine and served whole and hot under a napkin. To eat them, the diamond-shaped foot is pinched between thumb and finger and the inner tube pulled out of the scaly case. The claw is removed and the remaining flesh is swallowed. Historically, the indigenous peoples of Central California ate the stems of P. polymerus after cooking them in hot ashes.

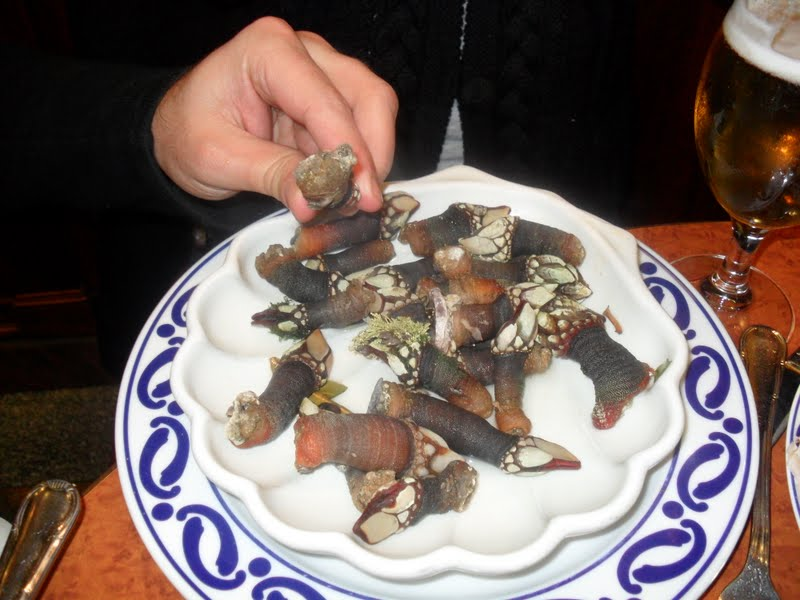
Goose barnacles served in a Spanish restaurant in Madrid.

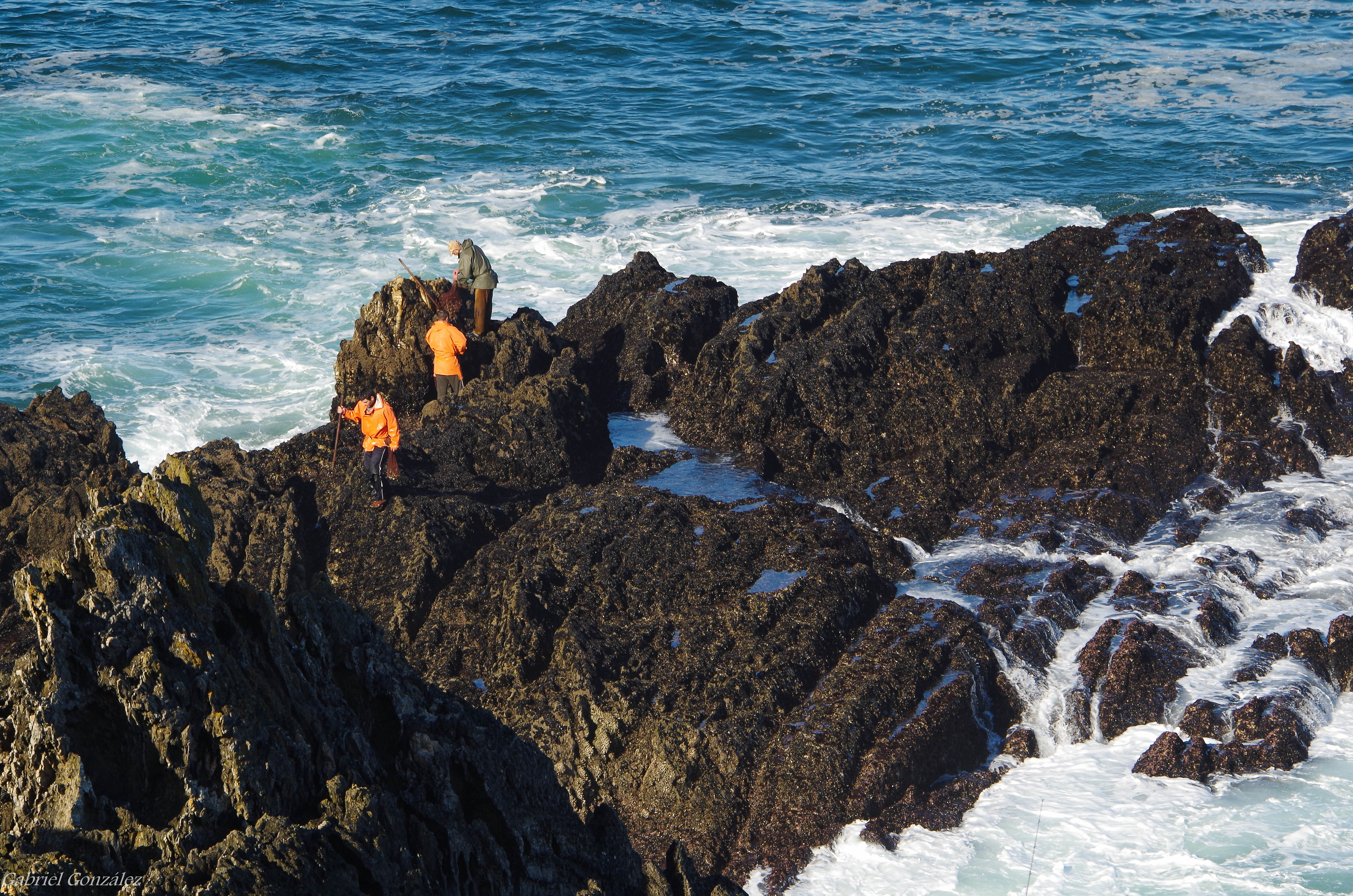
Percebeiros in Donón, Galicia
