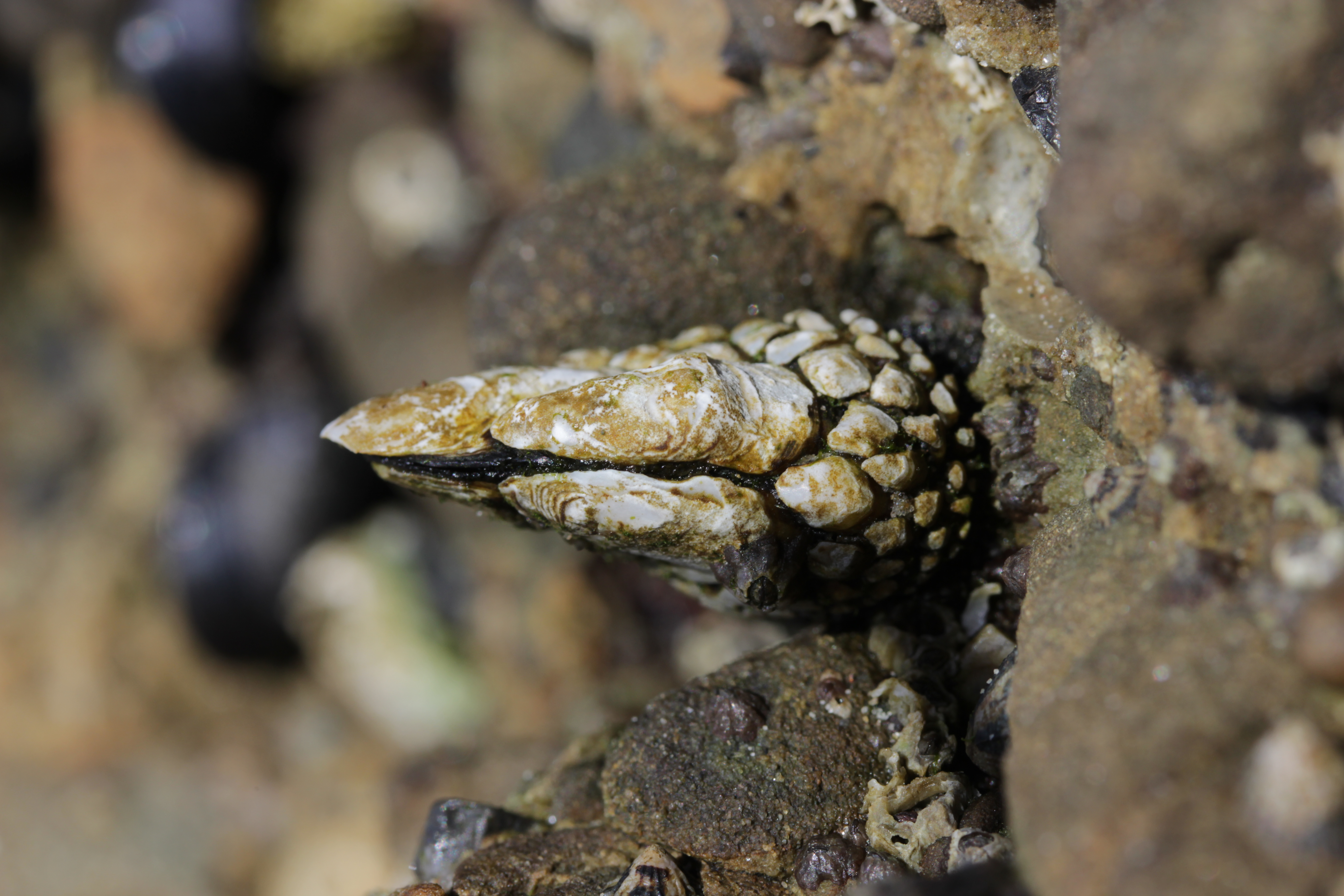
- Pollicipes polymerus, Gooseneck Barnacle, California

Scientific classification
- Kingdom: Animalia
- Phylum: Arthropoda
- Class: Thecostraca
- Subclass: Cirripedia
- Infraclass: Thoracica
- Superorder: Thoracicalcarea
- Order: Pollicipedomorpha; Chan et al., 2021

= Pollicipedomorpha =

Order of barnacles

Pollicipedomorpha is an order of pedunculated barnacles in the class Thecostraca. There are 3 families and more than 30 described species in Pollicipedomorpha.

== Families ==
These families and genera belong to the order Pollicipedomorpha:

Order Pollicipedomorpha Chan et al., 2021

Family Lithotryidae Gruvel, 1905

Genus Lithotrya Sowerby, 1822

Family Pollicipedidae Leach, 1817

Genus Anelasma Darwin, 1852
Genus Capitulum Gray, 1825
Genus Pollicipes Leach, 1817

Family †Zeugmatolepadidae Newman, 1996

Subfamily †Martillepadinae Gale, 2014

Genus †Concinnalepas Gale, 2014
Genus †Etcheslepas Gale, 2014
Genus †Icenilepas Gale, 2014
Genus †Litholepas Nagler, Haug, Glenner & Buckeridge, 2017
Genus †Martillepas Gale, 2014
Genus †Subsecolepas Gale, 2020
Genus †Texaslepas Gale, 2020

Subfamily †Zeugmatolepadinae Newman, 1996

Genus †Aporolepas Withers, 1953
Genus †Tetrinus Hirt, 1992
Genus †Zeugmatolepas Withers, 1913
