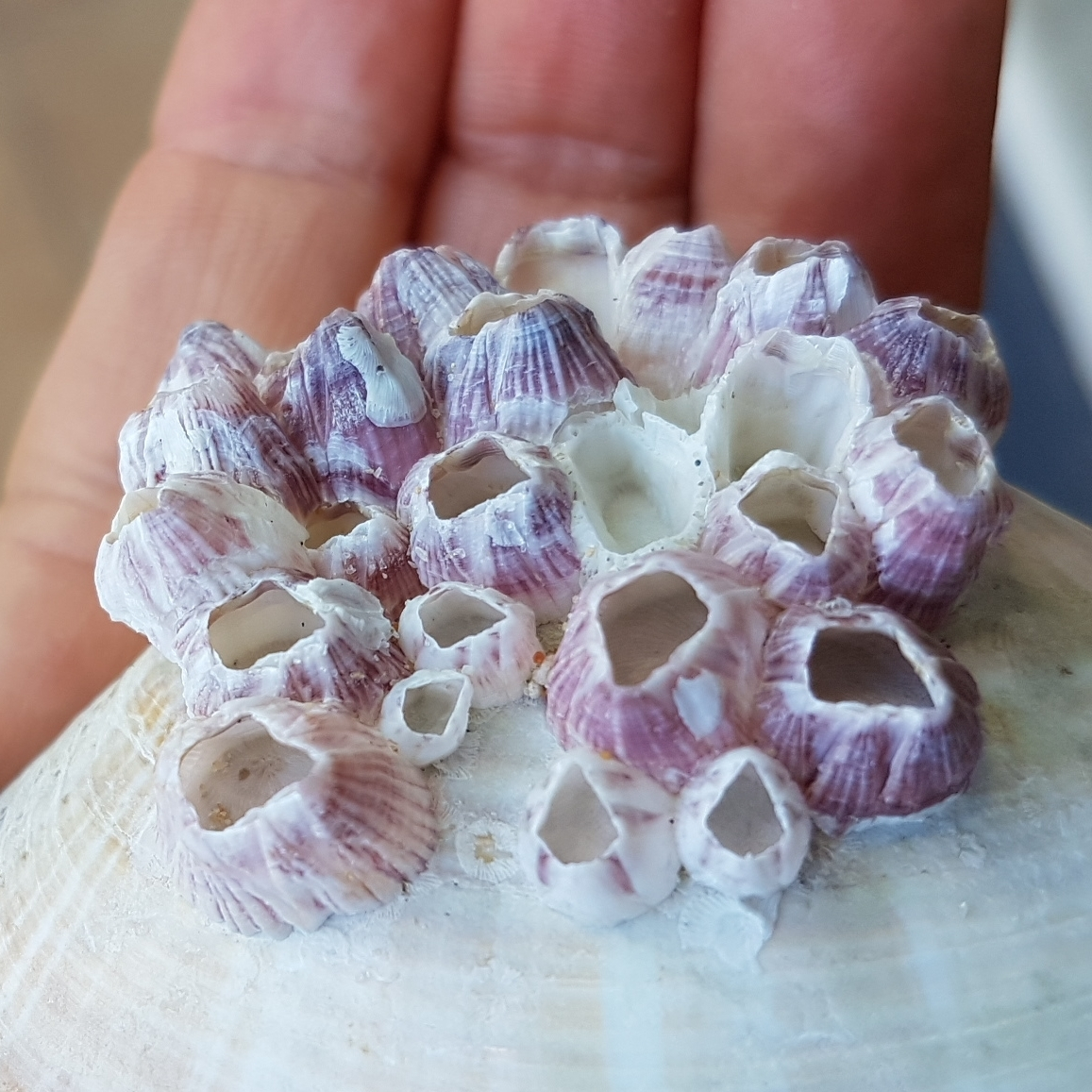
- Triangle barnacles found encrusting a shell in Portugal: they are introduced to the Atlantic Ocean.

Scientific classification
- Kingdom: Animalia
- Phylum: Arthropoda
- Clade: Pancrustacea
- Class: Thecostraca
- Subclass: Cirripedia
- Order: Balanomorpha
- Family: Balanidae
- Genus: Balanus
- Species: B. trigonus

Binomial name
- Balanus trigonus Darwin, 1854

= Balanus trigonus =

Triangle barnacle Temporal range: see text

Species of barnacle

Balanus trigonus, the triangle barnacle, is a species of barnacle in the family Balanidae. They are steep-sided, conical creatures, have six shell plates and are dark pink in colour. Originally found only in the Indo-Pacific and along the eastern Pacific coast, they were likely introduced to the Atlantic Ocean in the 19th century through human activity and now has a global distribution. Usually living on subtidal rocks and shells, they are also foulers of ships and dock infrastructure, and, in areas where they are invasive, may compete with native species for living room. The species was first described in the genus Balanus by Charles Darwin. It has since had its mitochondrial genome sequenced twice, with slightly differing results, leaving its phylogenetic position unsolved.

== Taxonomy ==
Balanus trigonus was first scientifically described in 1854 by Charles Darwin, with its current name. B. trigonus is commonly known as the "triangle barnacle". Darwin noted the species' wide distribution and found that young Balanus trigonus appear quite similar to Balanus tintannabulum; he described the species as being found in association with B. tintannabulum as well as with Balanus psittacus, B. improvisus, B. amphritite, and Elminius modestus. He thought the new species most closely related to Balanus spongicola.

=== Genetics ===
The mitochondrial genome of the triangle barnacle has been completely sequenced – twice. The mitochondrial genome is the DNA found in the mitochondria and making up just a part of the organism's entire genome; it can be used to trace maternal lines of descent. A 2021 study from South Korea found that triangle barnacles' mitochondrial DNA comprises 15336 base pairs and 37 genes with an order and traits similar to other Balanid species. The mitochondrial genome comprises 22 transfer RNA genes, two ribosomal RNA genes, and 13 protein-coding genes – for comparison, the human genome has about 20,000 of the latter. However, a study published earlier the same year based on Chinese specimens published similar results, except for a larger genome, with 15560 base pairs. The goal of both studies was to better understand Balanus trigonus' phylogenetic position based on the mitogenomes, though they yielded different results. The Korean study, considering the mitogenomes of 28 barnacles, placed B. trigonus closest to a clade comprising Fistulobalanus albicostatus and Amphibalanus amphitrite. The Chinese study, however, considered 30 barnacle species and concluded that B. trigonus paired with Acasta sulcata. F. albiostatus and A. amphitrite were included in the study, but were a few branch points further away. Similarly, A. sulcata was included in the Korean study, but shown to be more distantly related to B. trigonus.

Two possible phylogenetic trees for B. trigonus.

- - - Balanus trigonus
    - - Amphibalanus amphitrite
      - Fistulobalanus albicostatus
  - (other species)
- - - Acasta sulcata
    - - Megabalanus volcano
      - M. ajax and one other
  - (other species)

After Bae et al, 2021 – Korean study

- - - B. trigonus
    - Acasta sulcata
  - - M. ajax
    - M. volcano
- - - Amphibalanus amphitrite
    - F. albicostatus
  - (other species)

After Liu et al, 2021 – Chinese study

== Description ==
=== Shell ===
Triangle barnacles are typically around 2 centimetres (0.8 in) across at the base and form a steep-sided, conical shape, growing from 1.3 to 1.9 centimetres (0.5 to 0.7 in) tall. The barnacle shells include a shell wall, comprising plates which are connected by sutures to wrap around to form a circular barrier. In this species, the shell wall is made of six dark pink plates which are covered with white rib-like ridges as well as interior pores. Each plate is made up of a central triangular portion named the parietes, and overlapping side segments known as radii; the latter, in triangle barnacles, are paler than the parietes, being white or pale pink. A flat-shaped and pore-covered calcareous basis forms the bottom of the shell and connects to the ground or material the barnacle is growing on. The open top part of the barnacle shell which connects to the outside, the orifice, is relatively smooth and triangular in shape. It can be closed by the operculum, which is composed of two small shells, known as the tergum and the scutum; this acts as something of a lid for the barnacle. In living triangle barnacles, often only the scutum can be seen, and has up to six lines of small indentations caused by crossing furrows and ridges, whereas the tergum has a wide, dull spur which can take up up to half the opercular valve's width.

=== Cirri and mouth ===
Barnacles' cirri, their feeding appendages, have two segments known as rami. In triangle barnacles, the first pair of cirri have rami with different lengths, one twice as long as the other; in the second pair of cirri, the rami are roughly equal in length. The posterior sets of cirri have four pairs of spines. Barnacles' mouths have four sets of jaws and an "upper lip" called the labrum. Triangle barnacles' jaws have four teeth; the labrum, three.

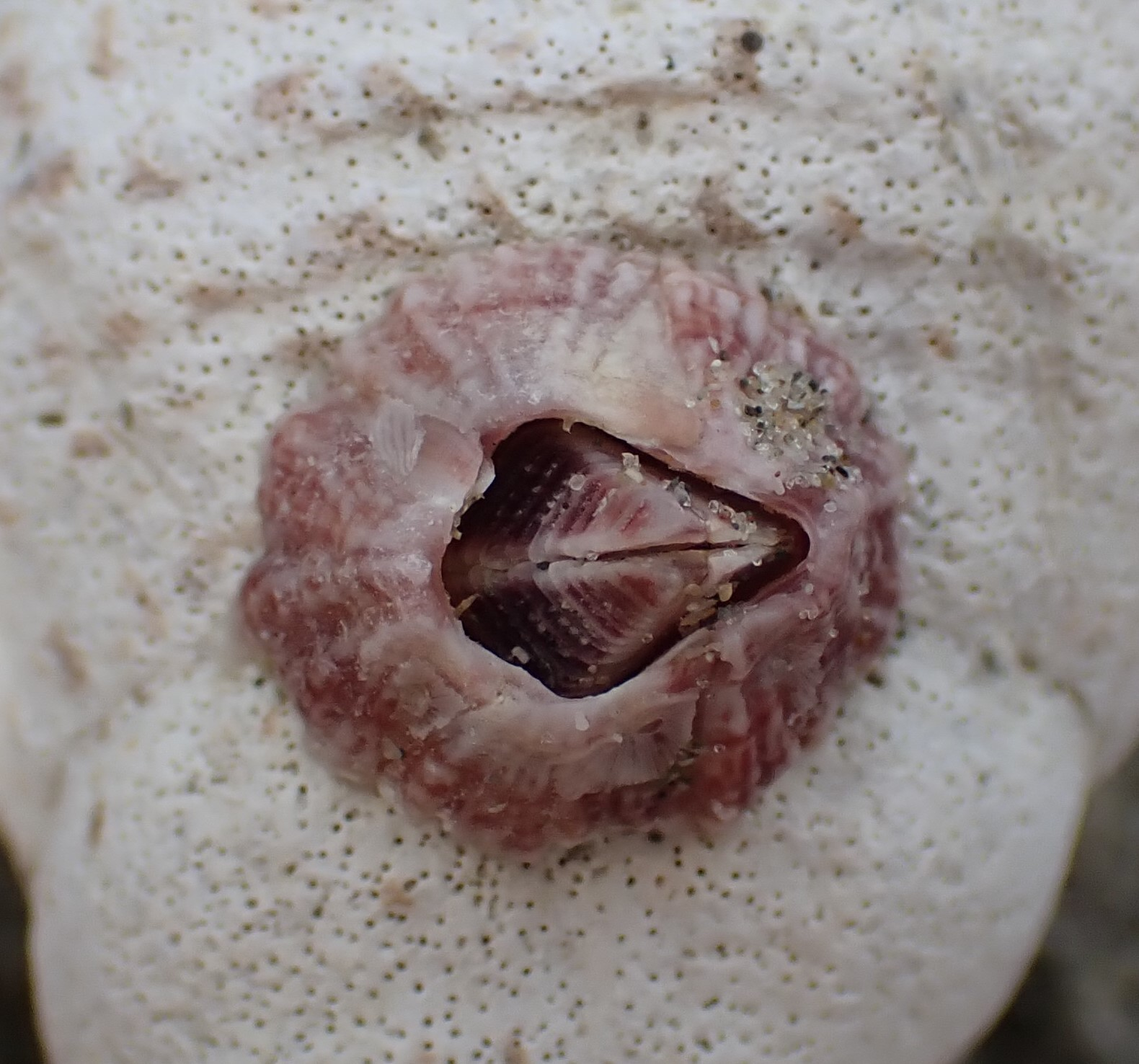
Top view of a triangle barnacle near Auckland, part of its native range in the Indo-Pacific. The orifice is the opening at the top of the barnacle, currently covered by the opercular valves.

== Distribution ==
Triangle barnacles are originally native to the Indian and Pacific oceans, but now have a cosmopolitan distribution. Darwin, in his original description, said the species was "widely distributed and where found seems to be common". He gave the species' range as including New Zealand, Sydney, the island of Java, the East Indian Archipelago, Peru, California, and what he called "West Columbia". Triangle barnacles are also native to the waters around Korea and the south of Japan but its presence in the north Sea of Japan is likely due to human activity. Triangle barnacles are also known from the Persian Gulf and the adjacent Gulf of Oman, around the Indian subcontinent, and along the east coast of Africa. However, all triangle barnacle presence in the Atlantic Ocean is introduced, which was once not believed to be true.

=== Presence in the Atlantic ===
Today, triangle barnacles are found in the Atlantic in an area drawn from False Bay, northwest to Rio Grande do Sul, north to North Carolina, and east to the Azores. The species is also abundant in the Mediterranean Sea. The triangle barnacle's invasion started in 1867 in southern Brazil when a species since synonymized with B. trigonus was reported from Florianópolis. In the subsequent decades, triangle barnacles were reported from elsewhere in Brazil and in Madeira, the Azores, Guinea, and the Congolese coast.By 1877, B. trigonus was reported fouling ships arriving at Cape Cod, although it was not reported elsewhere on the east American coast until the 1960s and the record is questionable. The triangle barnacle's Atlantic spread continued, with reports from the coasts off Morocco and Spain starting in 1887. The first Mediterranean record of the species came in 1927.

The 1992 paper that first suggested B. trigonus was not an Atlantic native also said it "likely" that, given its nature as a fouling organism, the triangle barnacle was first introduced to the Atlantic through human shipping. The barnacles' spread through the Atlantic may have been aided by that period's whaling industry. Today, its spread across the east American coast may be causing the decline of a related species, Balanus calidus. However, B. calidus' perceived decline may only be a short-term fluctuation.

=== Fossil range ===
A report on the voyage of the HMS Challenger in the 19th century tentatively identified some Javan fossils dating to what was then known as the Tertiary period as representing B. trigonus. Since then, B. trigonus has been reported from late Cenozoic deposits, but those occurrences may not be valid; it has also been reported (without description) from the Miocene, but that report may be a misidentification; the species has been also reported from the Pliocene but again likely based on a misidentification. B. trigonus has also been featured in undocumented reports on the Miocene of Cuba and the Pliocene of Florida. It has been found as Pleistocene or possibly Holocene fossils. Somewhat more concretely, B. trigonus is abundantly present in the fossil record of parts of the east Pacific coast, with fossils dating to the Pleistocene period.

== Habitat ==
All triangle barnacles attach themselves to shells, wood, rocks, and the hulls of ships. They may attach themselves to living crustaceans, corals, and sea urchins. One Panulirus gracilis lobster had no fewer than 1019 attached cypris larvae and 1746 encrusted adults on it. The barnacles are often considered fouling organisms of ships and dock infrastructure. In parts of the world where they are an invasive species, they may compete with other, native species for living room. They are usually a subtidal species, living below the water level. They have often been recorded as deep as 450 metres (1,480 ft) below water, and once from 3,000 metres (9,800 ft).

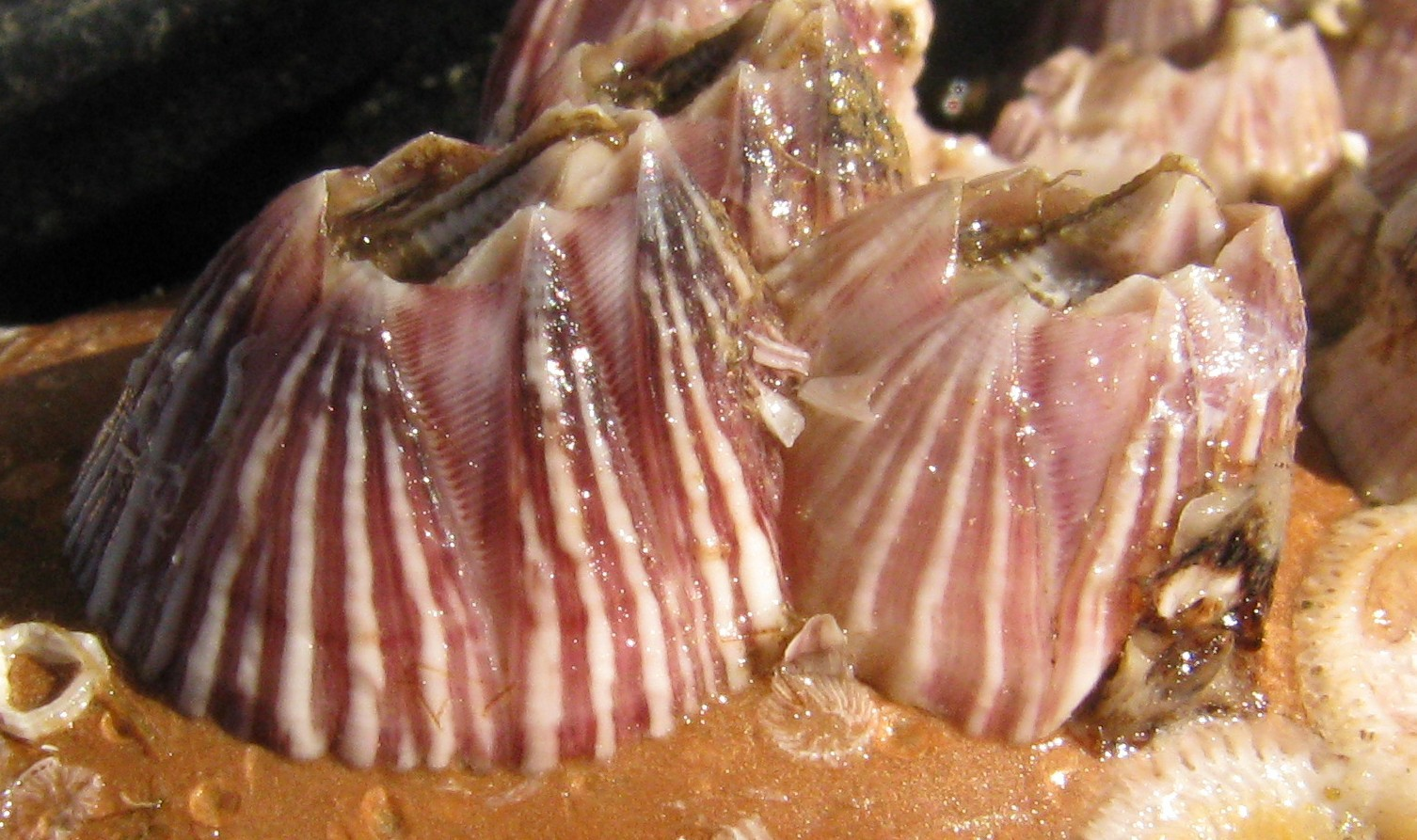
Side view of adult triangle barnacles in Spain, showing the ridged parietes

== Reproduction and growth ==
Barnacles are sessile as adults but have motile larval stages, first the nauplii, and then the cyprids, which do not eat but attach themselves to a substrate and metamorphosed into adults. The adults reproduce year-round, and individuals only a month old may do so as well. A given barnacle may also produce multiple broods each year.

=== Larvae and metamorphosis ===
The front half of the nauplii is relatively wide and circular, giving the nauplii a "teardrop"-like appearance. Nauplii have six stages, with distinctive characteristics in each, and their size grows from stage to stage. In the first stage, laboratory-raised specimens measured no more than 240 micrometres (9.4 mils), with some variation; by the third stage they measured 480 micrometres (19 mils), give or take 18 μm (0.71 mils). In the sixth stage the nauplius larvae measured 880 μm (35 mils). The nauplii have spines, horns, and maxillules which help identify them; in the final stage of their development, the nauplii have a pair of compound eyes and the primordia of some cyprid appendages. The subsequent cyprid larvae also have compound eyes.

A 1990 study revealed that on average, in 20 °C conditions, it took an average of eleven days for the barnacles to grow from a newborn nauplius to the cyprid stage. A later study found that higher water temperatures (28 °C) caused the nauplii to metamorphose into cyprids more quickly, in less than six days. These cyprids subsequently attached themselves to a polystyrene substrate at a success higher rate with a medium temperature (24 °C) and relatively high salinity (34‰), but did not attach themselves at all when both the temperature (18 °C) and salinity (22‰) were lowered. When these conditions were combined, creating an environment with high temperature but lower salinity, the larvae metamorphosed quickly, but less than one third of the subsequent cyprids then attached themselves to the substrate.

=== Adult development ===
In laboratory conditions, half of all barnacles died within 3–4 weeks of attachment. As they age, the barnacles change their orientation, which is primarily affected by water movement and secondarily by light. Generally, the barnacles orient themselves perpendicularly to the water flow. Caribbean and Floridan populations take about 20 weeks (0.38 years) to grow to their maximum size, but New Zealand specimens grow larger and far faster – 1.8 millimetres (71 mils) longer in under four weeks. The causes of this difference may be due to geographical variation or different measurement techniques.

== Diet ==
Triangle barnacles feed on plankton such as diatoms and copepods. The barnacles are able to assimilate and retain large amounts of metals they may get from their diets, such as zinc and cadmium, into their bodies. Concentrations of these metals are often relatively high in barnacles.
