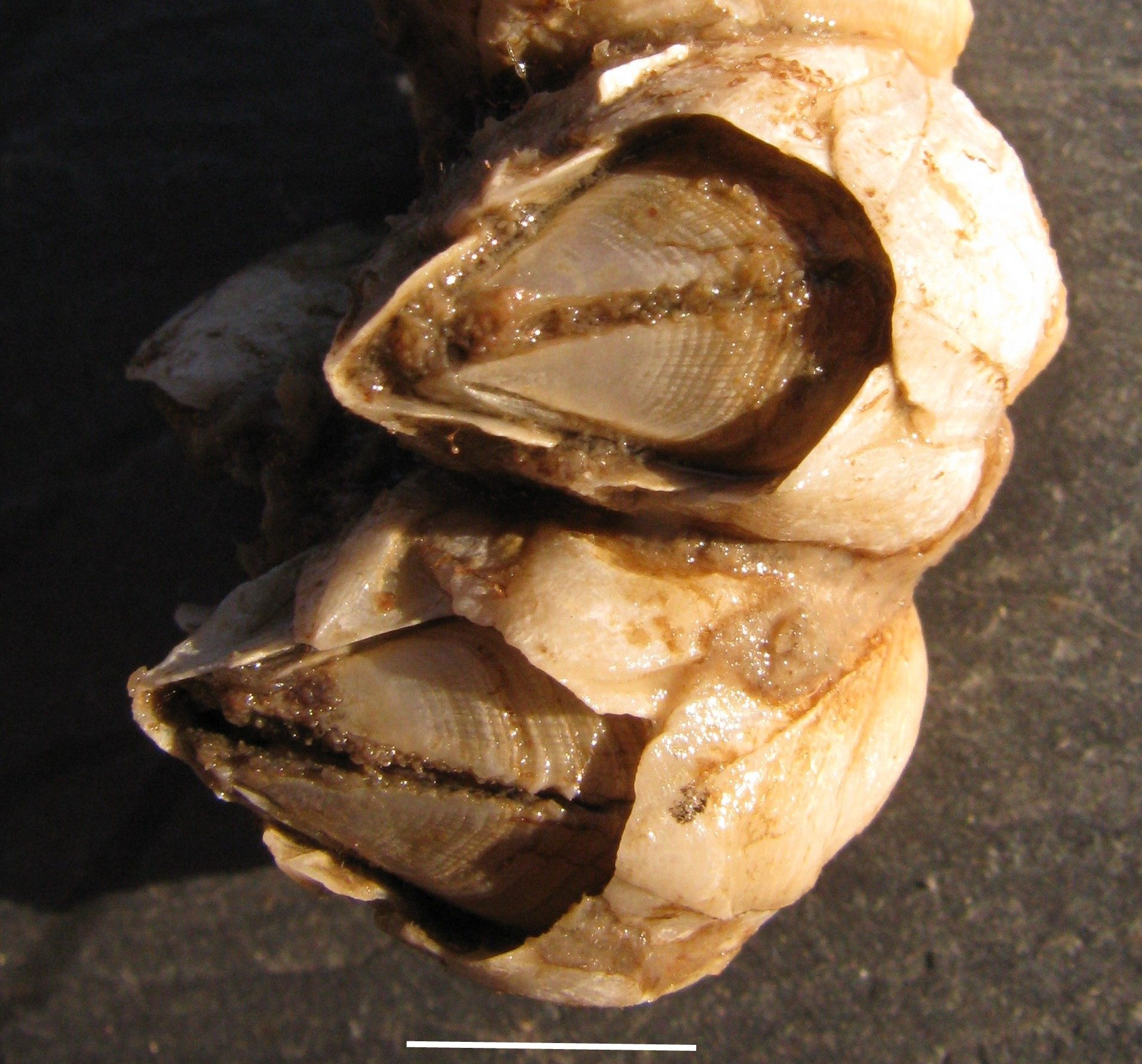

Scientific classification
- Domain: Eukaryota
- Kingdom: Animalia
- Phylum: Arthropoda
- Class: Thecostraca
- Subclass: Cirripedia
- Order: Balanomorpha
- Family: Balanidae
- Genus: Amphibalanus
- Species: A. eburneus

Binomial name
- Amphibalanus eburneus (A. A. Gould, 1841)

Synonyms
- Balanus eburneus Gould, 1841

= Ivory barnacle =

Species of barnacle

Amphibalanus eburneus, the ivory barnacle or American acorn barnacle, is a species of acorn barnacle in the family Balanidae. It occurs on the east coast of North America, the Caribbean Sea and Gulf of Mexico.

== Description ==
The ivory barnacle is a medium-sized, cone-shaped sessile barnacle with a white test composed of fused plates. It has a diamond-shaped operculum protected by a hinged lid formed from two triangular halves each consisting of two plates, a tergum and a scutum. It can grow to a height of 2.5 cm (0.98 in) but most individuals are much smaller. This barnacle can be confused with the white bay barnacle (Balanus improvisus) but that species is smaller, only growing to a height of 6 mm (0.24 in). Another similar species is the striped barnacle (Balanus amphitrite) but that has vertical pink lines on the test.

== Distribution and habitat ==
The native range of the ivory barnacle extends from Nova Scotia to the Caribbean Sea and Gulf of Mexico but it has extended this range as a result of fouling the bottoms of ships and because its larvae are sometimes transported in ballast water. It was first seen in Pearl Harbor, Hawaii in 1929 and is now common in all the main islands. It is found, sometimes in great numbers, from low tide mark to depths of 37 m (121 ft) attached to hard surfaces including rocks, mollusc shells, pilings, jetties and other man-made structures, ships' hulls and the roots of the red mangrove (Rhizophora mangle).

== Reproduction ==
Ivory barnacles tend to aggregate with others and form dense populations. Each one is a hermaphrodite but cross fertilisation takes place when an individual protrudes its long penis and inserts it into the operculum of an adjoining individual where eggs have already developed. Sperm is deposited there, and the fertilised eggs are brooded in the mantle cavity. On hatching, the larvae are expelled into the water column and become planktonic. They pass through six naupliar stages and one cyprid stage over the course of one to two weeks. The nauplii feed on phytoplankton but the cyprid larvae do not feed. They search out sites for settlement, possibly following chemical cues from already established adults or testing the substrate for suitability. Once settled, they cement themselves by their heads to the surface and undergo metamorphosis into juvenile barnacles.
