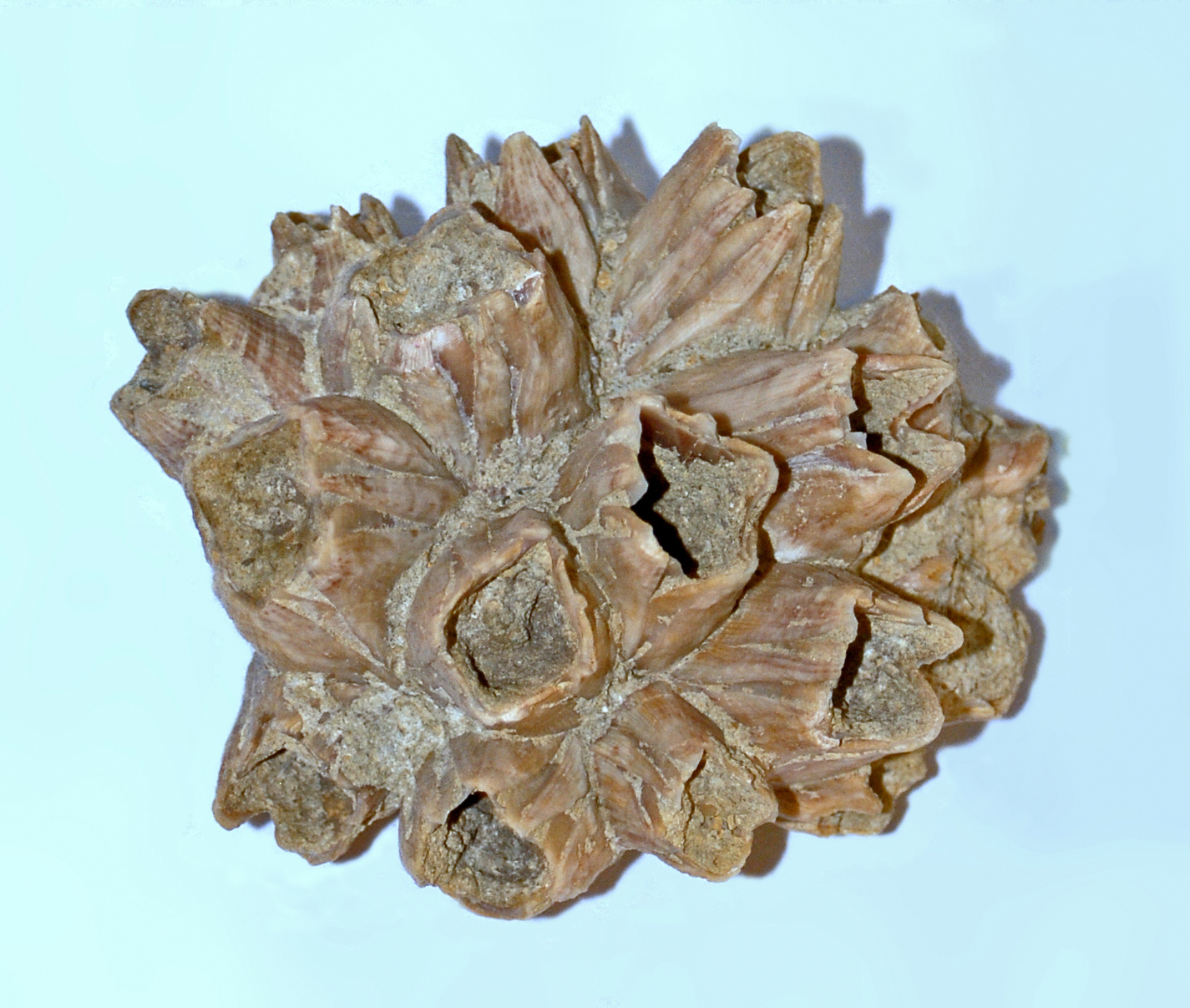
- Fossil of Concavus concavus

Scientific classification
- Kingdom: Animalia
- Phylum: Arthropoda
- Class: Thecostraca
- Subclass: Cirripedia
- Order: Balanomorpha
- Family: Balanidae
- Subfamily: Concavinae
- Genus: †Concavus; Newman, 1982

Type species
- †Balanus concavus Bronn, 1831 (Note: Urszula Radwańska and Andrzej Radwański argue this species's author citation should be Darwin, 1854.)

= Concavus =

Concavus Temporal range: Early Miocene–Early Pleistocene

Genus of barnacles

Concavus is an extinct genus of barnacles.

== Species ==
As of 2021, WoRMS recognizes the following two species:

- †Concavus concavus (Bronn, 1831) (Note: Urszula Radwańska and Andrzej Radwański argue this species's author citation should be Darwin, 1854.) — Pliocene–early Pleistocene; Western Europe.
- †Concavus crassostricola Zullo, 1984 — Early Miocene; North Carolina and northern Florida.

== Taxonomic history ==
The genus was circumscribed by William A. Newman in 1982. His original list of subgenera and species for the genus was the following:

- Concavus Newman, 1982 genus
  - Concavus Newman, 1982 subgenus
    - †C. concavus (Bronn, 1831)
  - Menesiniella Newman, 1982 subgenus
    - C. (M.) aquila Pilsbry, 1916
    - C. (M.) regalis Pilsbry, 1916
  - Arossia Newman, 1982 subgenus
    - C. (A.) panamensis (Rogers, 1948)
      - C. (A.) p. panamensis (Rogers, 1948)
      - C. (A.) p. eyerdami (Henry, 1960)
    - C. (A.) henryae Newman, 1982

Newman noted there were multiple fossil taxa in this genus, but didn't classify any except for the type species †C. concavus.

In 1992, Victor A. Zullo revised the genus. He created a new subfamily, Concavinae, with Tamiosoma Conrad, 1856 (the senior synonym of Menesiniella according to Zullo (Note: As of 2017, WoRMS recognizes both Tamiosoma and Menesiniella as valid, distinct genera.)), Arossia and Concavus among its genera. With his revision, Concavus only consists of the two species C. concavus and C. crassostricola.

== Fossil records ==
This genus is known in the fossil records from the Oligocene to the Quaternary (age range: from 28.4 to 0.012 million years ago). Fossils are found in the marine strata of United States, Italy, Mexico, Morocco, Algeria, France, Haiti, Madagascar, Panama, Colombia and Slovenia.
