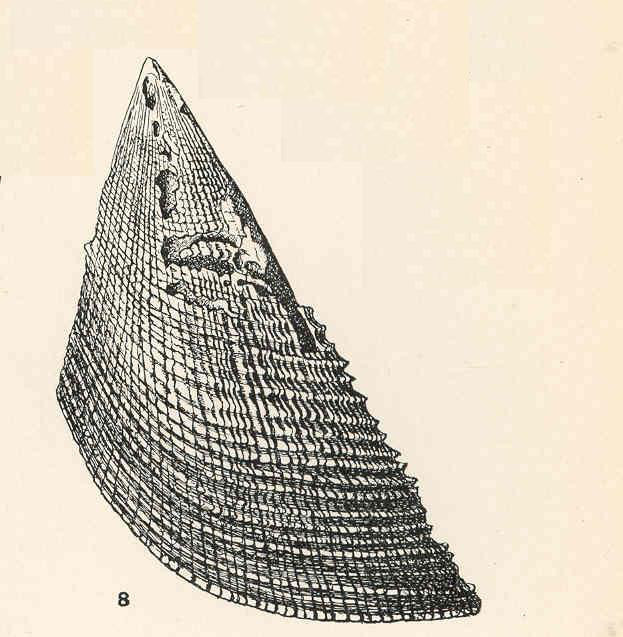
- Illustration

Conservation status
- Data Deficient (IUCN 2.3)

Scientific classification
- Kingdom: Animalia
- Phylum: Arthropoda
- Clade: Pancrustacea
- Class: Thecostraca
- Subclass: Cirripedia
- Order: Balanomorpha
- Family: Balanidae
- Genus: Menesiniella
- Species: M. aquila

Binomial name
- Menesiniella aquila (Pilsbry, 1907)

Synonyms
- Balanus aquila

= Menesiniella aquila =

Species of crustacean

Menesiniella aquila is a species of acorn barnacle in the family Balanidae. It is found off the California coast from San Francisco to San Diego from the bottom of the intertidal zone down to depths of 18 m. It is preyed upon by fish, sea stars, and certain carnivorous snails. Fish also rub against the barnacles to clean themselves of parasites, which wears the barnacles shells to a smooth surface.

This species was formerly a member of the genus Balanus.
