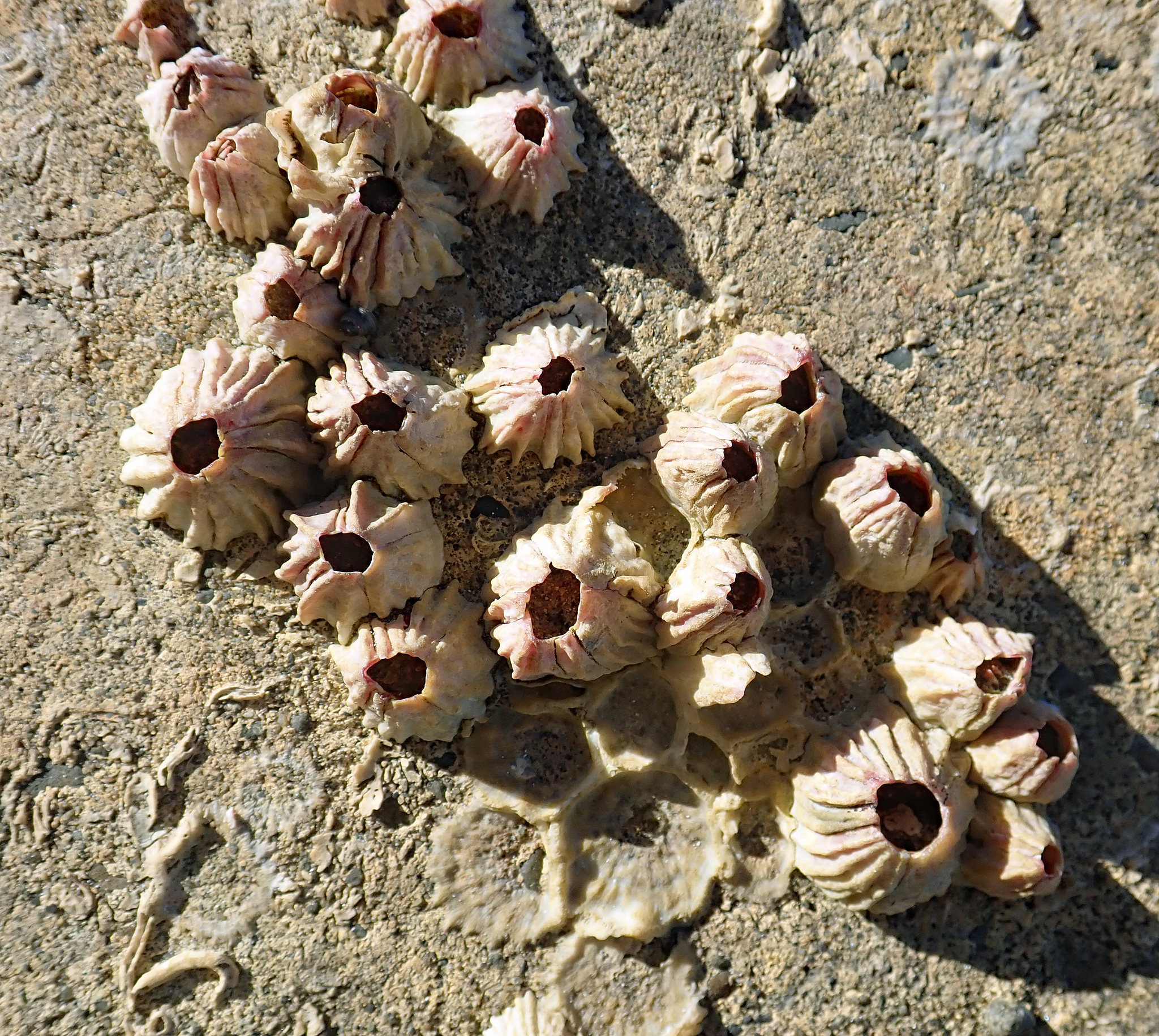
- Notobalanus vestitus, Chatham Islands, New Zealand

Scientific classification
- Kingdom: Animalia
- Phylum: Arthropoda
- Class: Thecostraca
- Subclass: Cirripedia
- Order: Balanomorpha
- Family: Balanidae
- Subfamily: Archaeobalaninae
- Genus: Notobalanus
- Species: N. vestitus

Binomial name
- Notobalanus vestitus (Darwin, 1854)

Synonyms
- Balanus vestitus Darwin, 1854; Austrobalanus vestitus (Darwin, 1854)

= Notobalanus vestitus =

Species of crustaceans

Notobalanus vestitus is a species of acorn barnacle in the family Balanidae. It is endemic to New Zealand. It was originally documented by Charles Darwin. Notobalanus vestitus was originally known as Balanus Vestitus Darwin.
