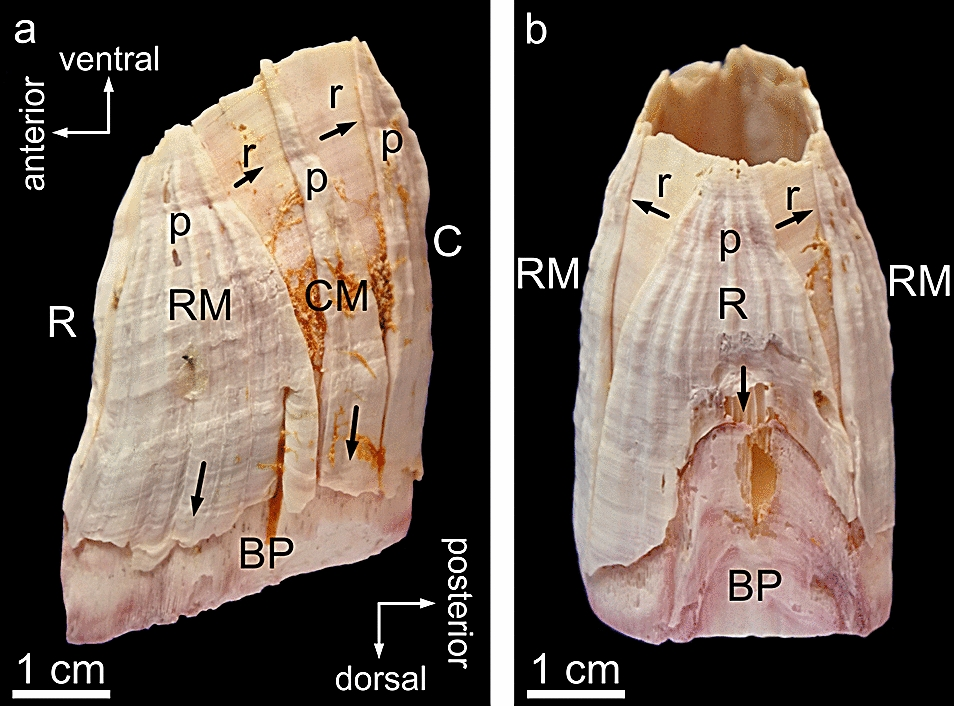
- Exoskeleton (shell) of the giant barnacle

Scientific classification
- Domain: Eukaryota
- Kingdom: Animalia
- Phylum: Arthropoda
- Class: Thecostraca
- Subclass: Cirripedia
- Order: Balanomorpha
- Family: Balanidae
- Genus: Austromegabalanus
- Species: A. psittacus

Binomial name
- Austromegabalanus psittacus (Molina, 1782)

= Austromegabalanus psittacus =

Species of barnacle

Austromegabalanus psittacus, the giant barnacle or picoroco as it is known in Spanish, is a species of large barnacle native to the coasts of southern Peru, all of Chile and southern Argentina. It inhabits the littoral and intertidal zones of rocky shores and normally grows up to 30 centimetres (12 in) tall with a mineralized shell composed of calcite. The picoroco barnacle is used in Chilean cuisine and is one of the ingredients in curanto.

== Description ==
Austromegabalanus psittacus is a large sessile barnacle that lives in groups on hard substrates. It has a tall cone-shaped carapace composed of twelve large plates made of calcite microcrystals which are cemented together. The basal disc is firmly cemented to a hard surface. It grows to a height of 30 centimetres (12 in). There is an opening at the top with a hinged operculum through which the thoracic limbs known as "cirri" protrude. The general colour is dull white with purple and brown markings.

== Biology ==
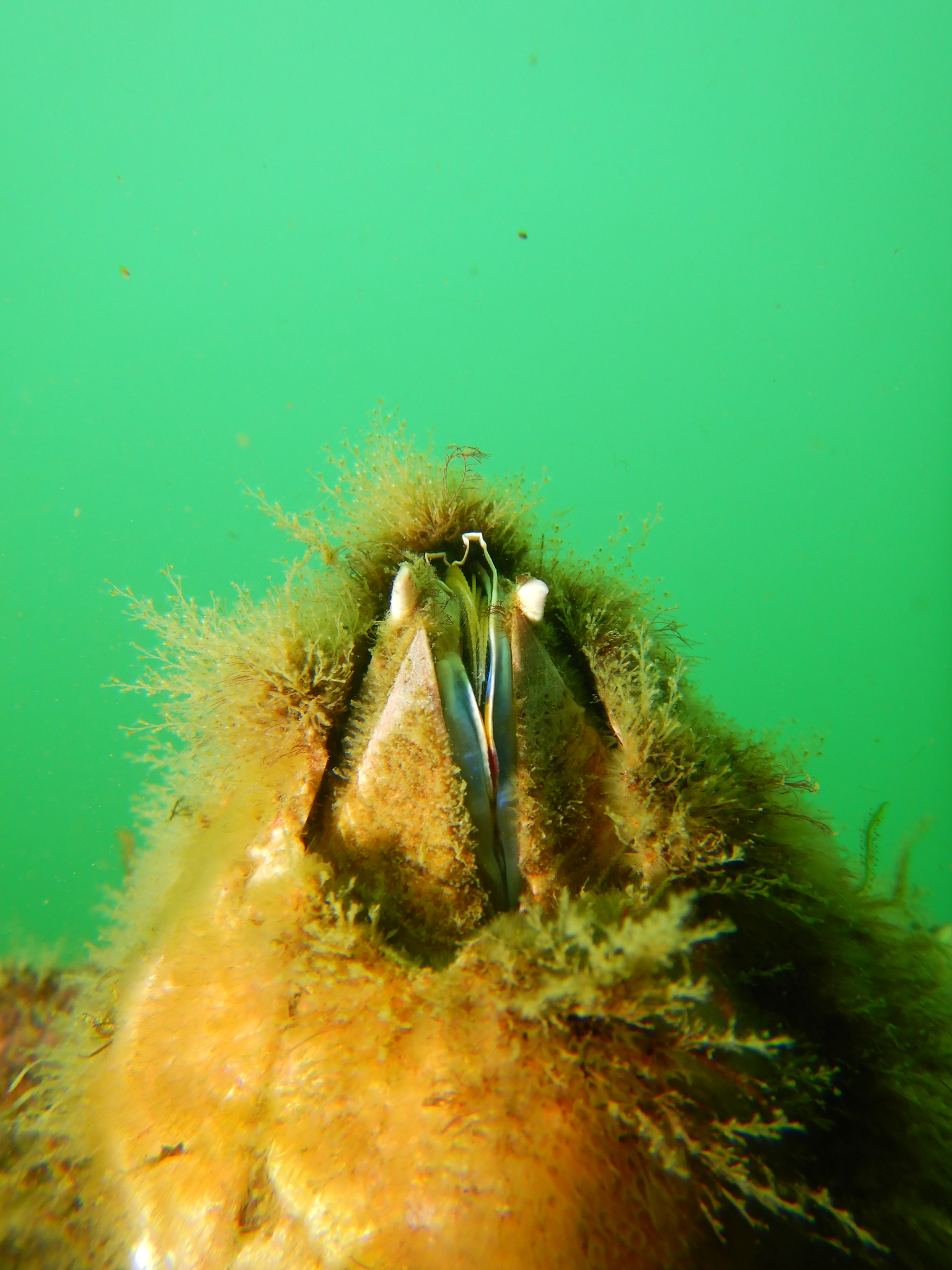
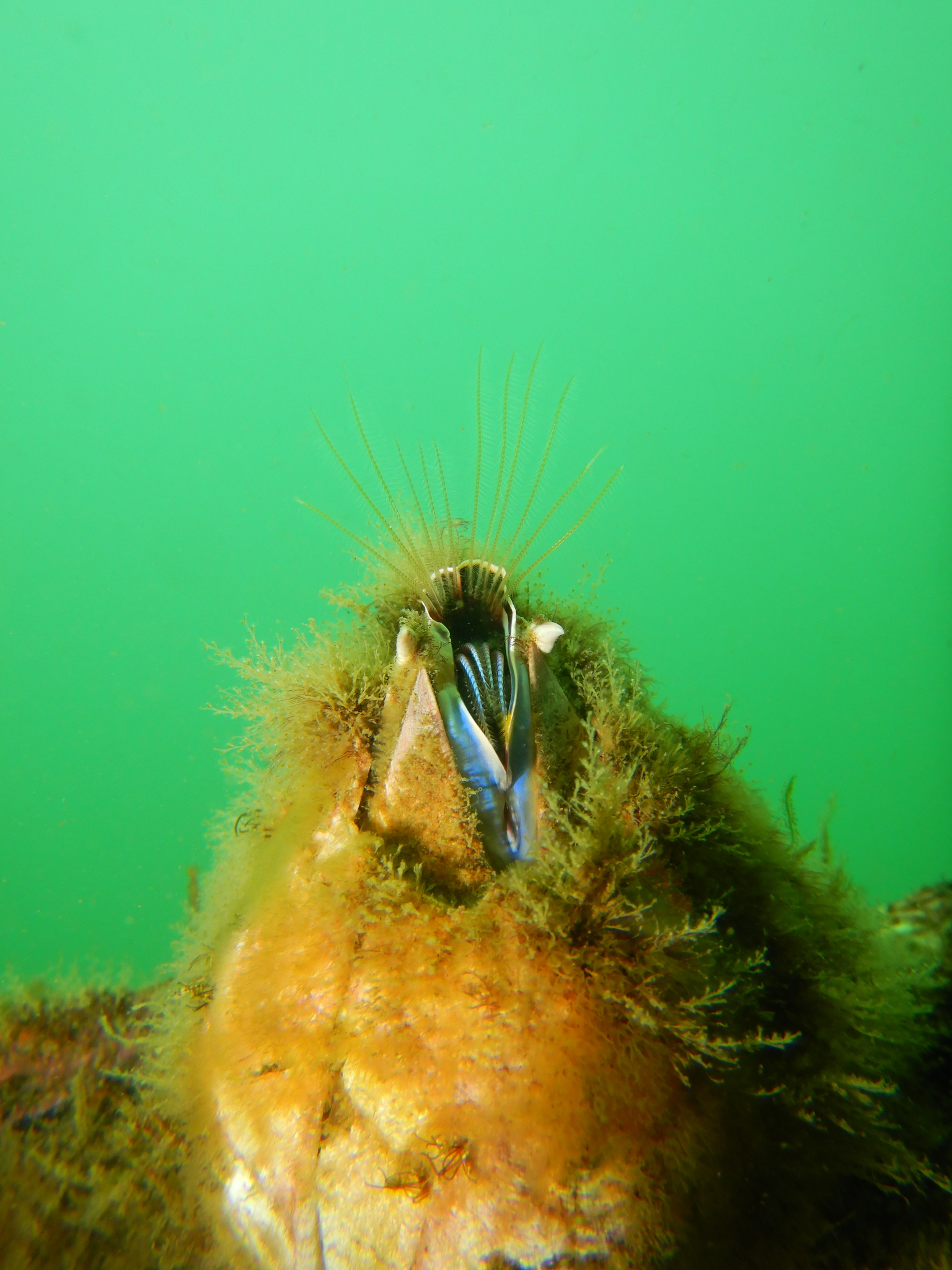
A. psittacus at rest (left) and later using its cirri (right) for filter feeding

Austromegabalanus psittacus is a simultaneous hermaphrodite. Individual barnacles are fertilised by sperm passed through a slender tube extended by a neighbouring barnacle. The eggs are retained inside the carapace where they are incubated for about three or four weeks. They then hatch into free swimming nauplius larvae which form part of the plankton. These pass through six stages over the course of about 45 days, the last being a cyprid stage. These larvae are about 1 mm (0.04 in) long and settle on the seabed, usually in the proximity of other barnacles.

Often the larvae settle so close together that hummocks are formed as the juvenile barnacles grow. Under these circumstances the calcareous base becomes modified into a more porous, cylindrical form above which the carapaces tower, the central individuals being about twice as tall as the outside ones. The density of the barnacles in the hummocks can be more than 1000 individuals per square metre (11 sq ft). This ability to form hummocks give this species an advantage when they are competing for space with other species of barnacle. It is an omnivorous filter feeder.

== Distribution ==
Austromegabalanus psittacus is a coastal species found in southern Peru, along the entire length of Chile (including offshore Juan Fernández Islands) and southern Argentina in the intertidal and littoral zone. It is recorded at depths of 0–35 m (0–115 ft), but is mostly found at 2–20 m (7–66 ft). It is most common in the Los Lagos area in Chile and is harvested for human consumption, mainly in the towns of Calbuco, Carelmapu and Puerto Montt.

== Use by humans and oceanic organisms ==
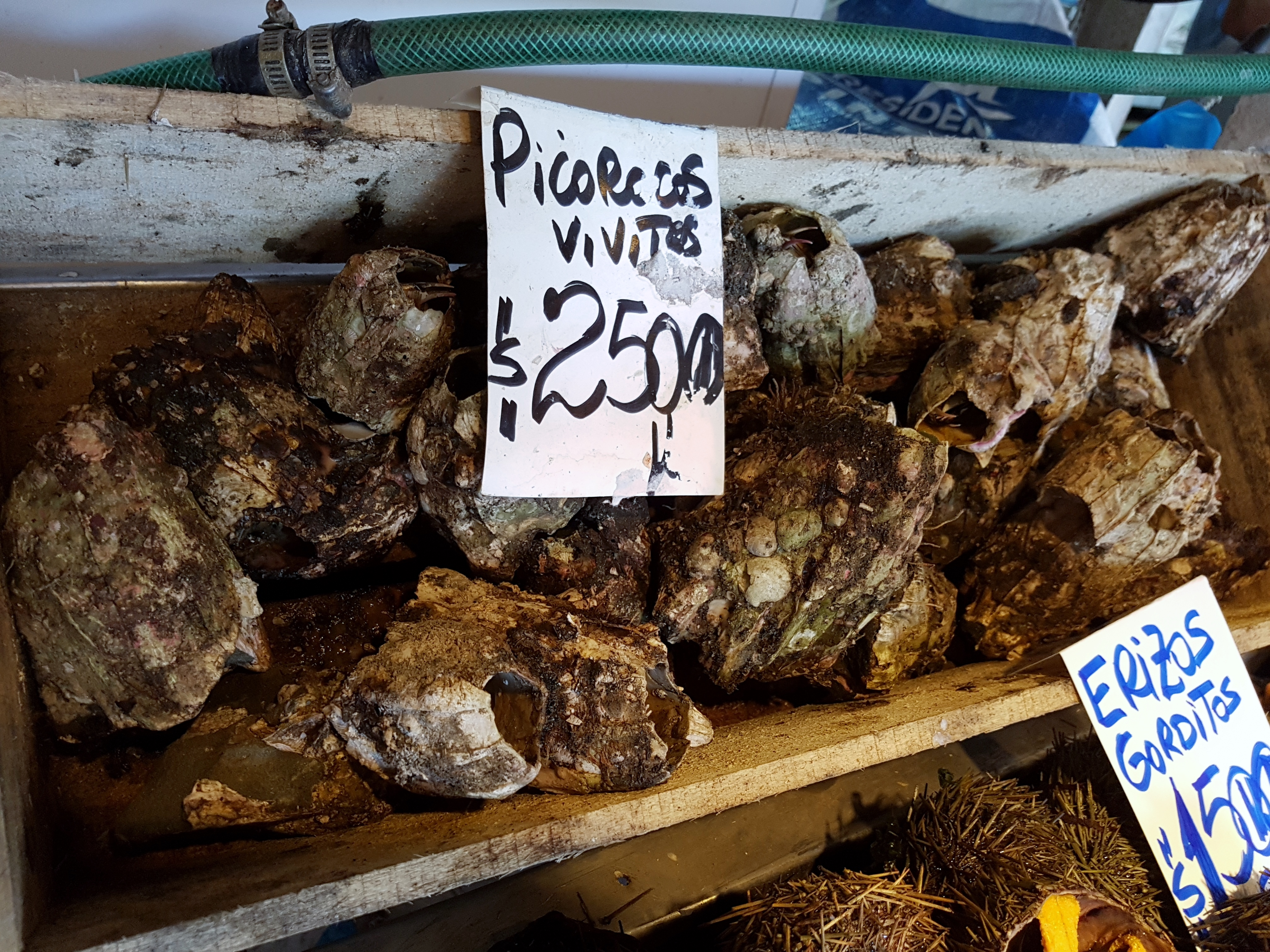
Austromegabalanus psittacus for sale at a food market in Santiago de Chile

This barnacle forms part of Chilean cuisine. Its meat is highly prized and is one of the ingredients of the Chilean dish curanto. This is traditionally made from various seafood ingredients cooked in a large pit preheated with red-hot stones. Modern cooking methods use a large pot, conventionally heated.

Overfishing has reduced the quantities of Austromegabalanus psittacus available for commercial harvesting. There are plans to cultivate it along the coast of Chile and there are possibilities of exporting it to Japan.

In addition to humans, the sea star Heliaster helianthus and the clingfish Sicyases sanguineus also eat this barnacle, although the clingfish can only prey on small animals (large Austromegabalanus psittacus are apparently safe).
