= Notobalanus flosculus =

Notobalanus flosculus Temporal range: Miocene–Present

Scientific classification
- Kingdom: Animalia
- Phylum: Arthropoda
- Class: Thecostraca
- Subclass: Cirripedia
- Order: Balanomorpha
- Family: Balanidae
- Genus: Notobalanus
- Species: N. flosculus

Binomial name
- Notobalanus flosculus (Darwin, 1854)

Species of acorn barnacle

Notobalanus flosculus is a species of sessile barnacle found off southwestern South America.

== Classification ==
Notobalanus flosculus was first scientifically described as Balanus flosculus by Charles Darwin in 1854.

== Distribution ==
Notobalanus flosculus is found around Chilé and Peru and N. flosculus var. sordidus is known from the Tierra del Fuego archipelago. Fossils of this barnacle dating to the Miocene epoch have been found in the Kerguelen Islands.

== Description ==
Notobalanus flosculus is a small barnacle with a "purple or dirty white" shell that lives in the littoral zone on detritus such as wood, rocks, and shells.
