= Armatobalanus nefrens =

Conservation status
- Data Deficient (IUCN 2.3)

Scientific classification
- Kingdom: Animalia
- Phylum: Arthropoda
- Class: Thecostraca
- Subclass: Cirripedia
- Order: Balanomorpha
- Family: Balanidae
- Genus: Armatobalanus
- Species: A. nefrens

Binomial name
- Armatobalanus nefrens (Zullo, 1963)

Synonyms
- Balanus nefrens

Species of barnacle

Armatobalanus nefrens is a species of barnacle in the family Archaeobalanidae. It is endemic to the United States, where it is found as far north as Monterey Bay. It lives embedded in the corals Stylaster californicus and Errinopora pourtalesii. It is listed as Data Deficient on the IUCN Red List.
