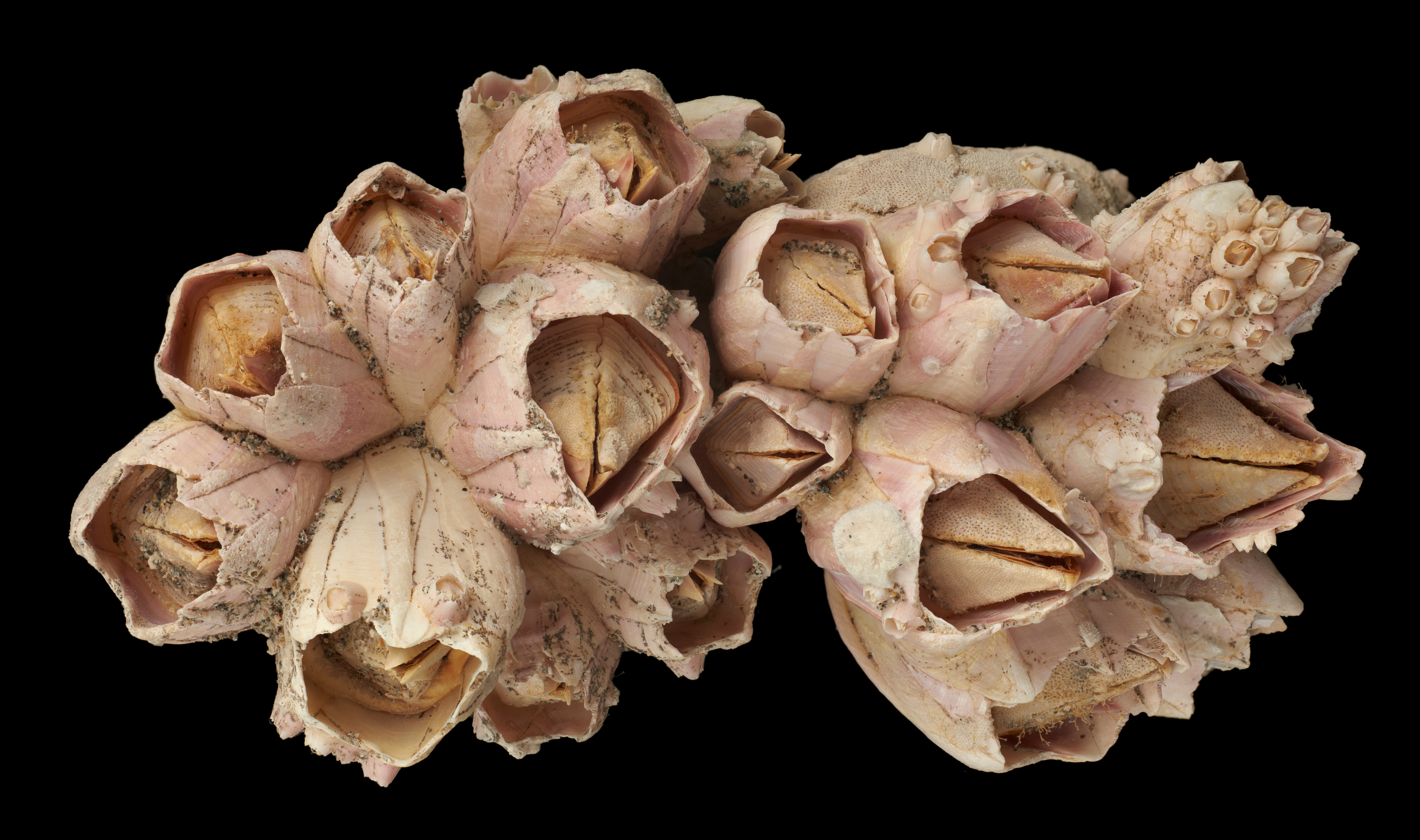

Scientific classification
- Kingdom: Animalia
- Phylum: Arthropoda
- Class: Thecostraca
- Subclass: Cirripedia
- Order: Balanomorpha
- Family: Balanidae
- Genus: Notomegabalanus
- Species: N. decorus

Binomial name
- Notomegabalanus decorus (Darwin, 1854)

Synonyms
- Balanus decorus Darwin, 1854

= Notomegabalanus decorus =

Species of barnacle

Notomegabalanus decorus, the pink barnacle, is a species of acorn barnacle in the family Balanidae.

== Subspecies ==
These subspecies belong to the species Notomegabalanus decorus:

- Notomegabalanus decorus argyllensis Buckeridge, 1983
- Notomegabalanus decorus ronarchensis Carriol, 1992
