= Notomegabalanus concinnus =

Scientific classification
- Kingdom: Animalia
- Phylum: Arthropoda
- Class: Thecostraca
- Subclass: Cirripedia
- Order: Balanomorpha
- Family: Balanidae
- Genus: Notomegabalanus
- Species: N. concinnus

Binomial name
- Notomegabalanus concinnus (Darwin, 1854)

Species of barnacle

Notomegabalanus concinnus is a species of barnacle in the family Balanidae. The species is harmless to humans and can be found in New Zealand and Argentina. It was described by Charles Darwin in 1854.
