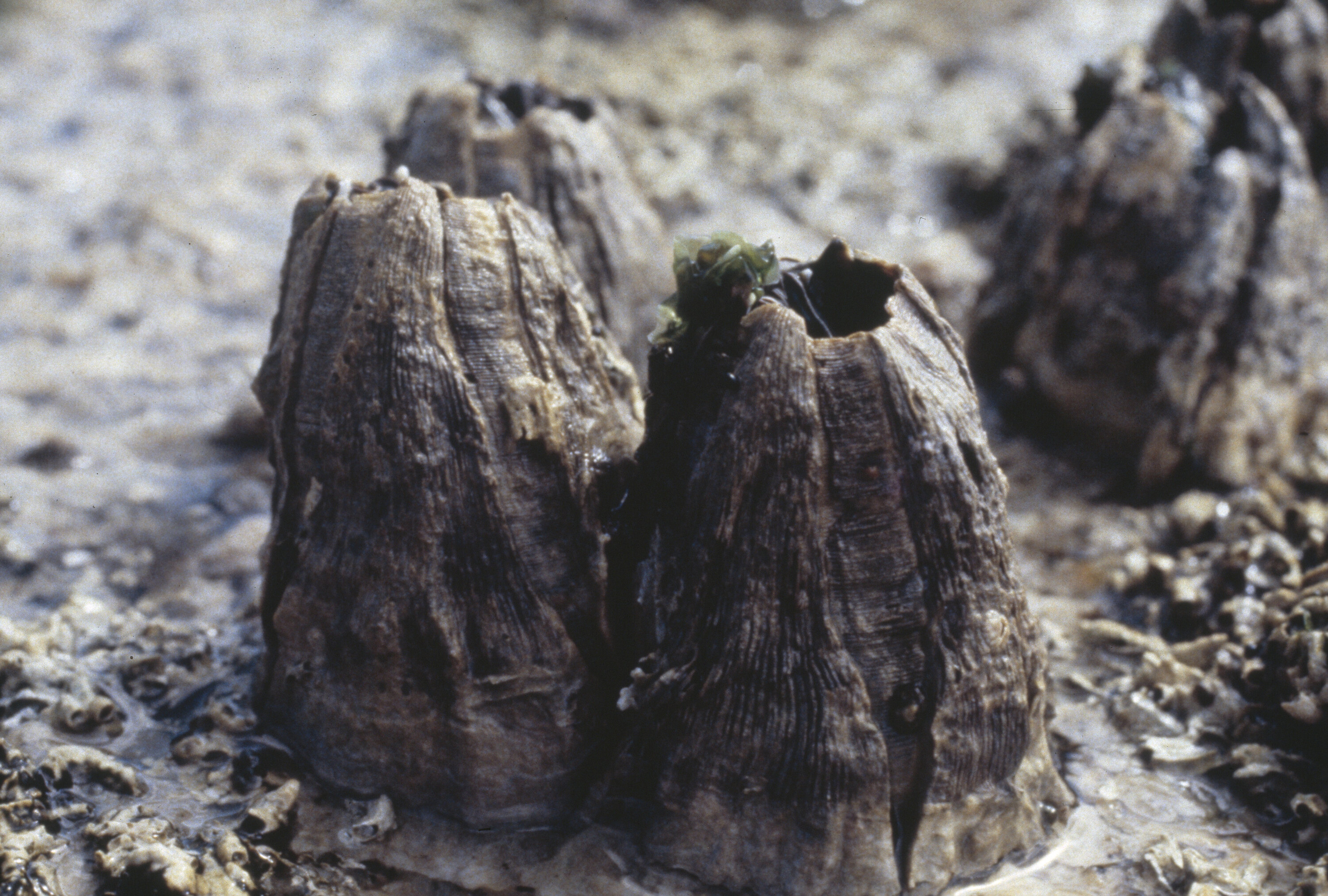

Scientific classification
- Domain: Eukaryota
- Kingdom: Animalia
- Phylum: Arthropoda
- Class: Thecostraca
- Subclass: Cirripedia
- Order: Balanomorpha
- Family: Balanidae
- Genus: Austromegabalanus
- Species: A. nigrescens

Binomial name
- Austromegabalanus nigrescens (Lamarck, 1818)

= Austromegabalanus nigrescens =

Species of barnacle

Austromegabalanus nigrescens, the giant black barnacle, is a species of acorn barnacle found along the coasts of Australia and the west Pacific.

== Classification ==
Austromegabalanus nigrescens, colloquially known as the giant black barnacle, was first scientifically described in 1818 as Balanus nigrescens by Jean-Baptiste Lamarck.

== Description ==
The giant black barnacle is the largest species of acorn barnacle found on Australia' coastlines, growing up to 6 cm tall and 3 cm across.

== Distribution ==
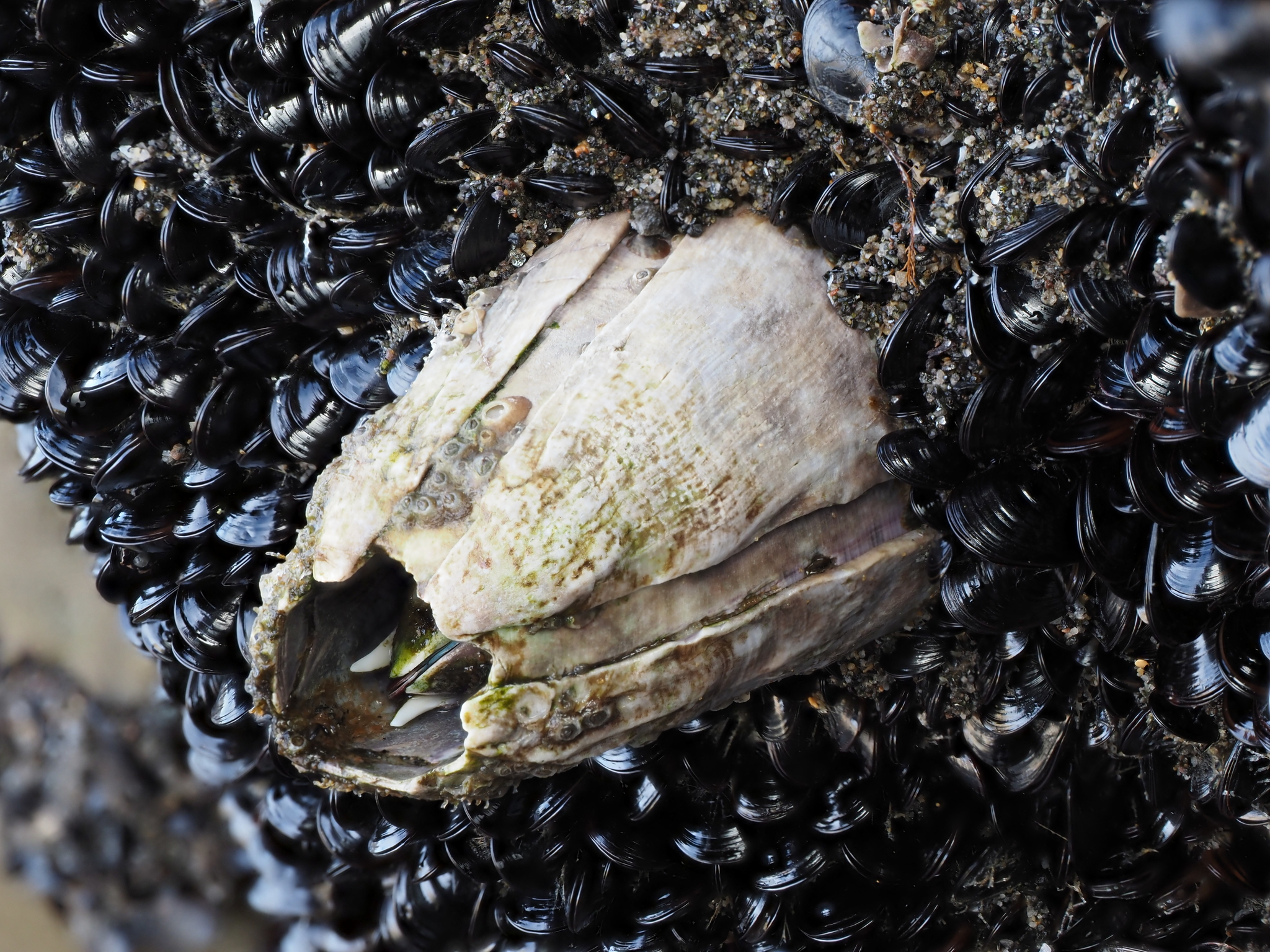
Giant black barnacle pictured in New Zealand's Taranaki region.

Giant black barnacles are found in New Zealand and the south of Australia.
