= Acasta alba =

Scientific classification
- Kingdom: Animalia
- Phylum: Arthropoda
- Clade: Pancrustacea
- Class: Thecostraca
- Subclass: Cirripedia
- Order: Balanomorpha
- Family: Balanidae
- Genus: Acasta
- Species: A. alba

Binomial name
- Acasta alba Barnard, 1924

Species of barnacle

Acasta alba is a species of barnacle in the Balanidae family.

== Description ==
Barnard said that the species is "almost exactly a combination of A. fenestrata and A. purpurata, approaching perhaps nearer to the latter." The shell is 4 mm long and completely white when preserved, and the radii are more narrow than their parietes.

The posterior ramus of the first cirrus is double the length of the anterior ramus. The posterior ramus of the second cirrus is slightly longer than the anterior ramus, and the third cirrus has rami of about equal length. The fourth cirrus has two recurved teeth on the second point of the peduncle. Of the 17 joints of the anterior ramus, joints one through seven has between two and three recurved teeth, and the eighth joint has one tooth. Every joint of the fifth and sixth cirri has three pairs of setae on its anterior margin. The penis is longer than the posterior cirri, has setea, and has small wrinkles.

== Taxonomy ==
The species was first formally described in 1924 by Keppel Harcourt Barnard.
