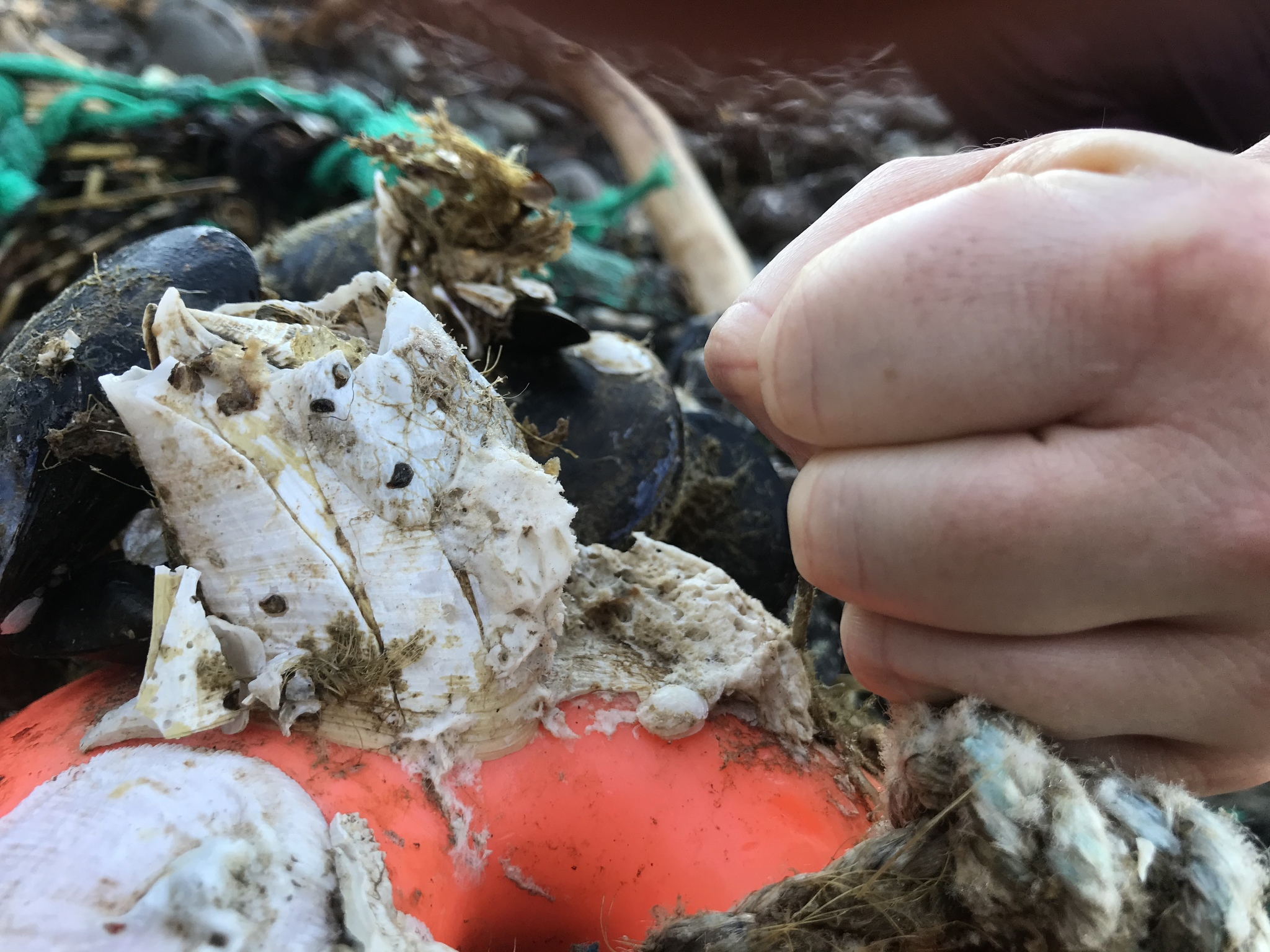
- Chirona hameri, Nova Scotia, Canada

Scientific classification
- Kingdom: Animalia
- Phylum: Arthropoda
- Class: Thecostraca
- Subclass: Cirripedia
- Order: Balanomorpha
- Family: Balanidae
- Subfamily: Archaeobalaninae
- Genus: Chirona
- Species: C. hameri

Binomial name
- Chirona hameri (Ascanius, 1767)

= Chirona hameri =

Species of barnacle

Chirona hameri is a species of acorn barnacle in the family Balanidae. It can be found in the lower St. Lawrence estuary, specifically the western slope of Newfoundland.
