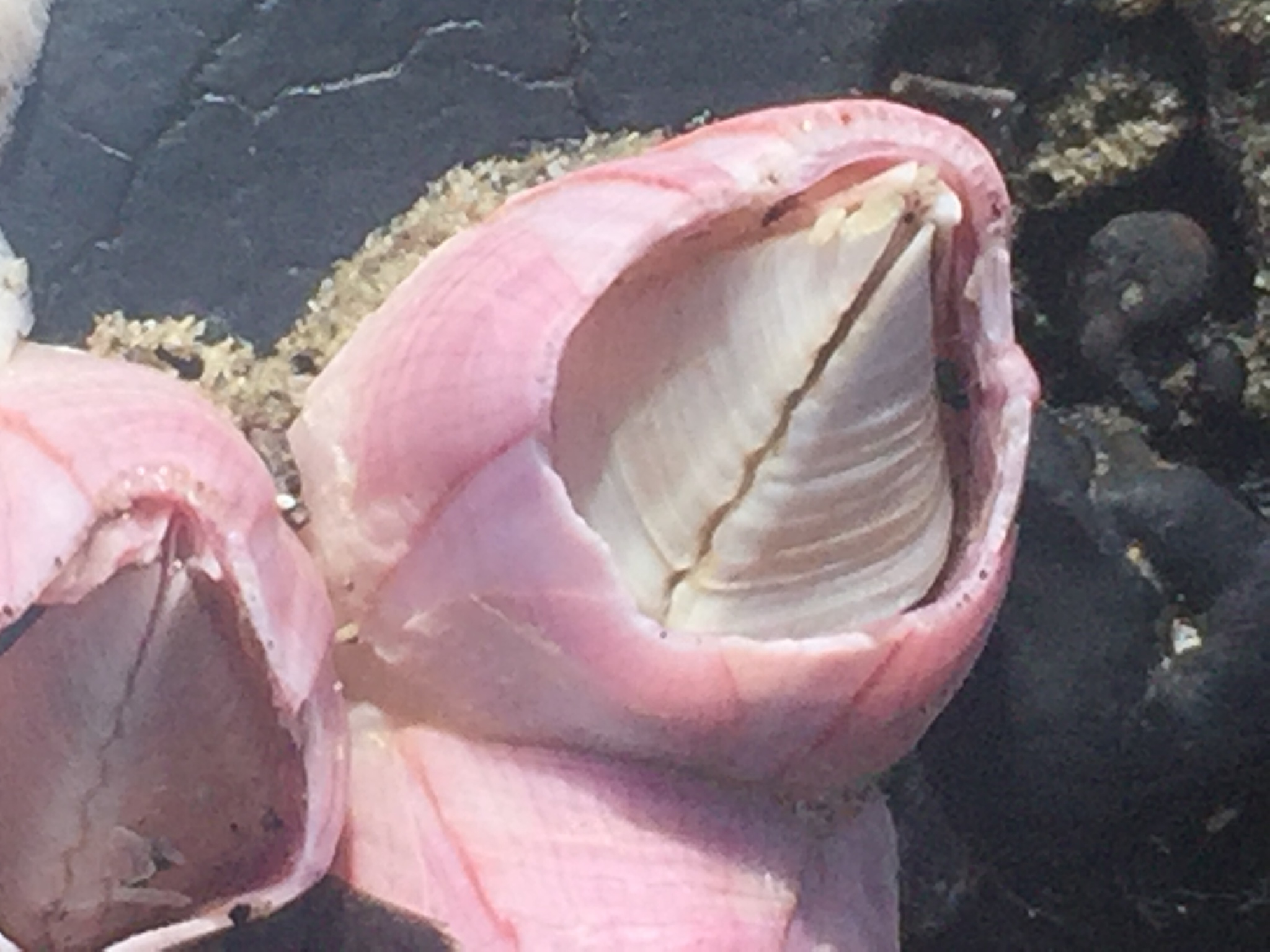
- Notomegabalanus decorus, pink barnacle, New Zealand

Scientific classification
- Kingdom: Animalia
- Phylum: Arthropoda
- Class: Thecostraca
- Subclass: Cirripedia
- Order: Balanomorpha
- Family: Balanidae
- Subfamily: Megabalaninae
- Genus: Notomegabalanus; Newman, 1979

= Notomegabalanus =

Genus of crustaceans

Notomegabalanus is a genus of acorn barnacles in the family Balanidae. There are about 12 described species in Notomegabalanus.

== Species ==
These species belong to the genus Notomegabalanus:

- Notomegabalanus algicola Pilsbry, 1916 (white dwarf barnacle)
- Notomegabalanus buckeridgei Carriol, 2002
- Notomegabalanus campbelli (Filhol, 1885)
- Notomegabalanus concinnus (Darwin, 1854)
- Notomegabalanus decorus (Darwin, 1854) (pink barnacle)
- Notomegabalanus insperatus Zullo & Guruswami-Naidu, 1982
- Notomegabalanus krakatauensis (Nilsson-Cantell, 1934)
- Notomegabalanus lepidus Zullo, 1986
- Notomegabalanus miodecorus Buckeridge, 1983
- Notomegabalanus obliquus (Ross, 1964)
- Notomegabalanus squillae (Daniel & Ghosh, 1963)
- Notomegabalanus wilsoni (Zullo, 1969)
