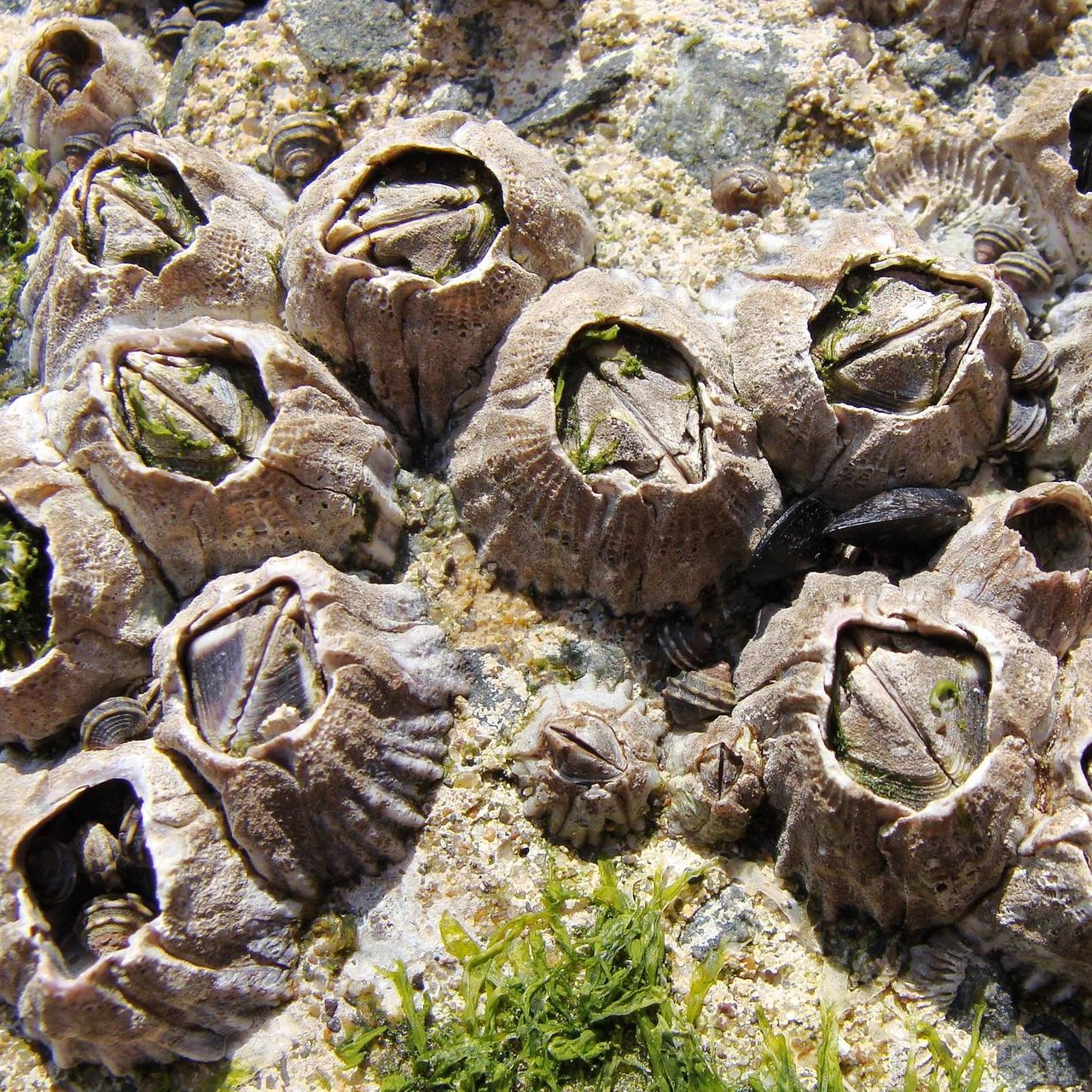
- Fistulobalanus albicostatus

Scientific classification
- Kingdom: Animalia
- Phylum: Arthropoda
- Class: Thecostraca
- Subclass: Cirripedia
- Order: Balanomorpha
- Family: Balanidae
- Subfamily: Amphibalaninae
- Genus: Fistulobalanus; Zullo, 1984

= Fistulobalanus =

Fistulobalanus Temporal range: 13.65–Recent Ma

Genus of barnacles

Fistulobalanus is a genus of barnacles, comprising the following species:

- Fistulobalanus abeli (Lami & André, 1932)
- Fistulobalanus albicostatus (Pilsbry, 1916)
- Fistulobalanus amaraquaticus (Yamaguchi, 1980)
- Fistulobalanus citerosum (Henry, 1973)
- Fistulobalanus dentivarians (Henry, 1973)
- †Fistulobalanus klemmi Zullo, 1984
- Fistulobalanus kondakovi (Tarasov & Zevina, 1957)
- Fistulobalanus pallidus (Darwin, 1854)
- Fistulobalanus patelliformis (Bruguière, 1789)
- Fistulobalanus shiloensis (Pilsbry, 1930)
- Fistulobalanus sumbawaensis Prabowo & Yamaguchi, 2005
- Fistulobalanus suturaltus (Henry, 1973)
