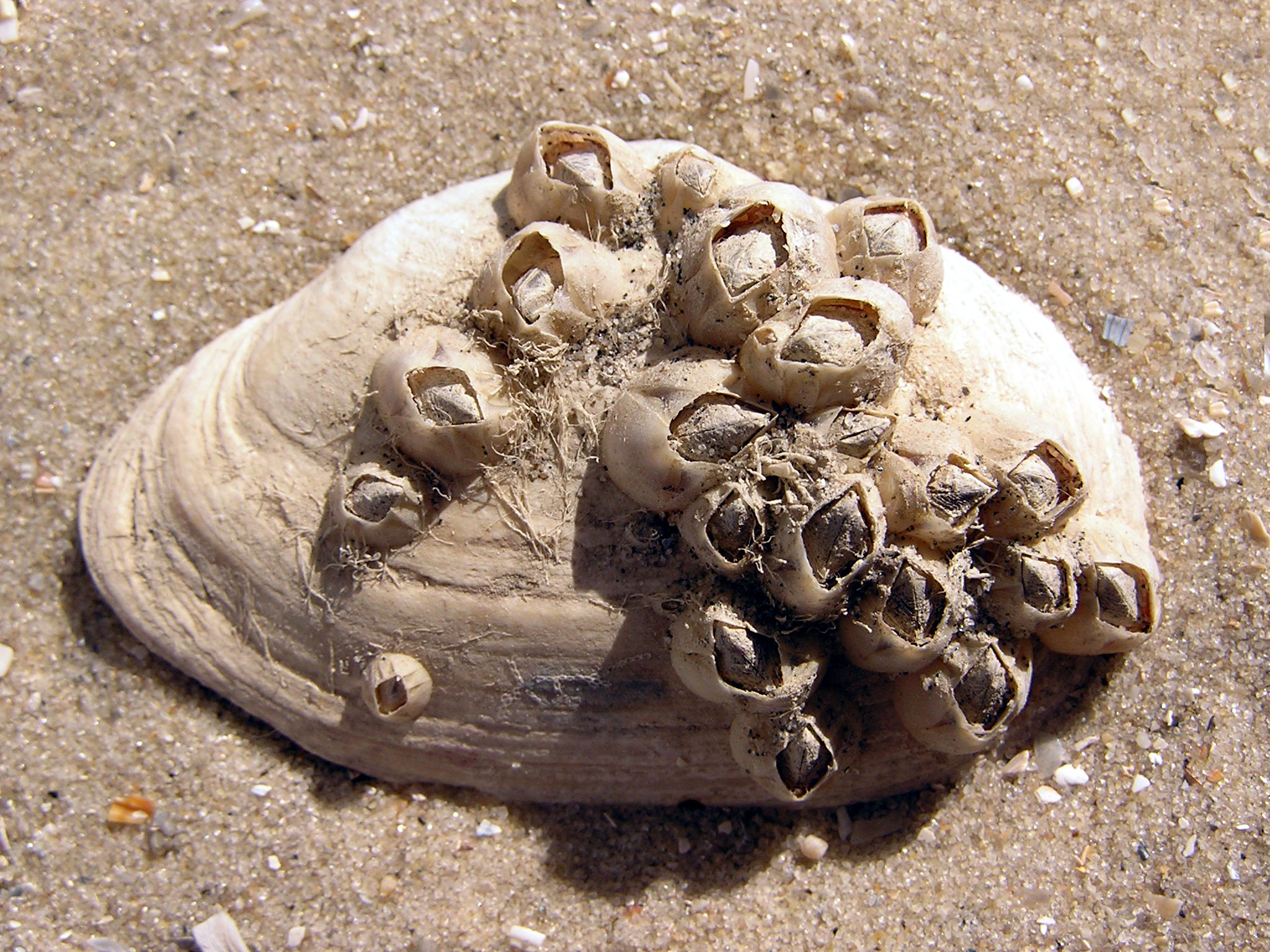

Scientific classification
- Kingdom: Animalia
- Phylum: Arthropoda
- Clade: Pancrustacea
- Class: Thecostraca
- Subclass: Cirripedia
- Order: Balanomorpha
- Family: Balanidae
- Genus: Amphibalanus
- Species: A. improvisus

Binomial name
- Amphibalanus improvisus (Darwin, 1854)

= Amphibalanus improvisus =

Bay barnacle

Species of barnacle

Amphibalanus improvisus, the bay barnacle, European acorn barnacle, is a species of acorn barnacle in the family Balanidae.

== Description ==
Amphibalanus improvisus has a smooth white or pale grey conical calcareous shell composed of six fused plates. There is an oval or rhombic opening at the top which is blocked by two hinged plates. Adults usually grow to about 10 mm (0.4 in) in diameter and 6 millimetres (0.24 in) in width though they are sometimes larger than this and can grow taller when densely packed. The base is characteristically grooved radially. This species can be confused with the striped barnacle (Amphibalanus amphitrite) and in European waters with the northern rock barnacle (Semibalanus balanoides) or the rock barnacle (Balanus crenatus).

== Distribution ==
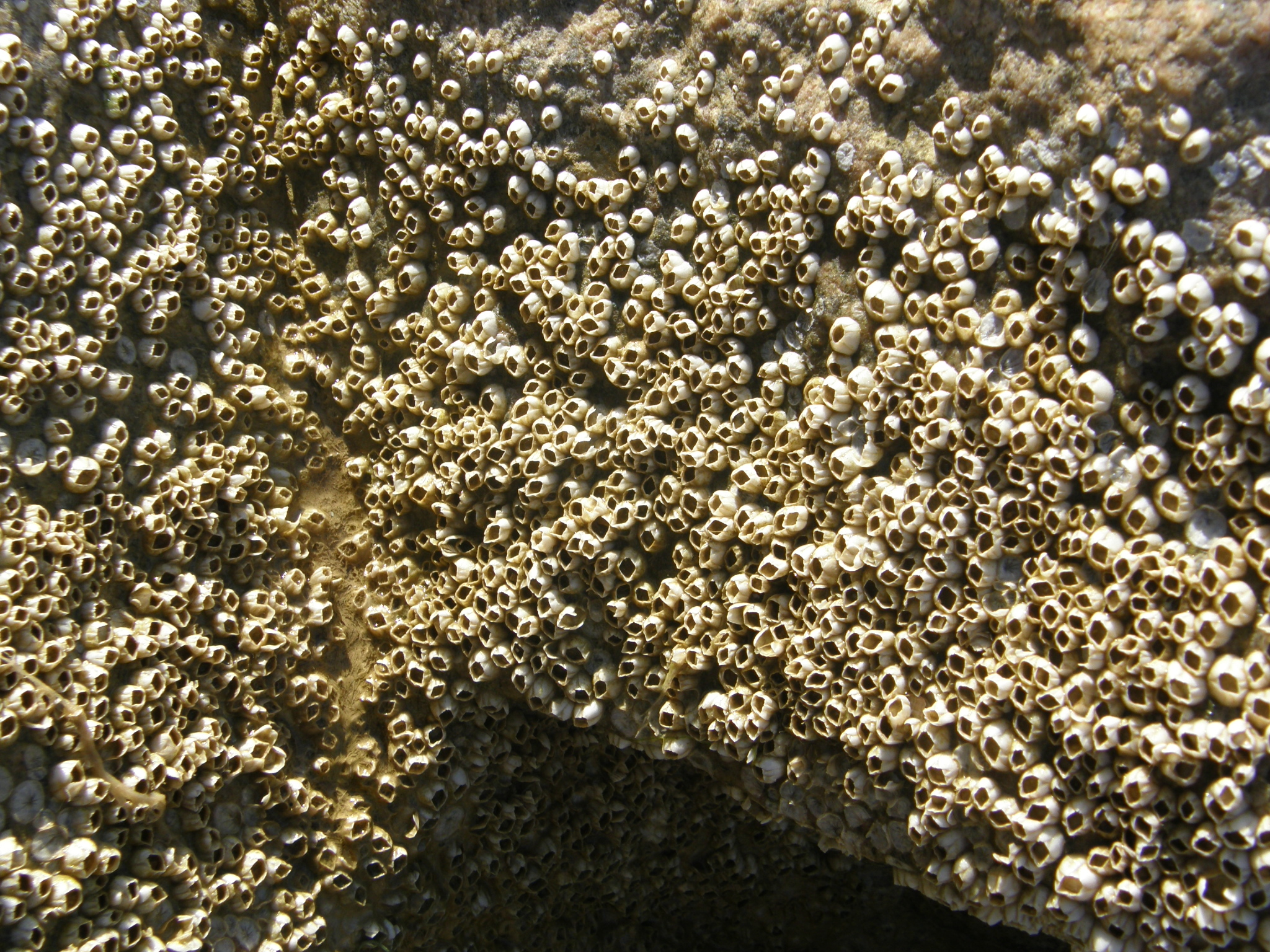
Bay barnacles in the Sea of Azov, Ukraine

Amphibalanus improvisus has a cosmopolitan distribution and is found in temperate and tropical parts of the Atlantic Ocean, the Arctic Ocean, the Baltic Sea, the North Sea, the Mediterranean Sea and the Black Sea. It is not known where the species natural range lies but it may have originated in North America. It has colonised many parts of the world's oceans including the Indo-Pacific and Australasia as a biofouling agent on the hulls of ships. It was one of the first recorded introductions to the Baltic Sea, having been found in Sweden and Lithuania in 1844, the Elbe estuary in 1854 and Great Britain in the 1880s.

== Habitat ==
Amphibalanus improvisus is found, sometimes in vast numbers, down to a depth of about 6 metres (20 ft) on rocks, man made structures, buoys, ships' hulls, the shells of crabs and molluscs, and certain seaweeds. It has been known to block the water intake pipes of factories and power stations. It is tolerant of both high and low salinity levels and is often found in estuaries and low salinity bays. As an invasive species it competes with native organisms and it is an unwanted coloniser of the shells of cultivated oysters and mussels and aquaculture cages.

== Biology ==
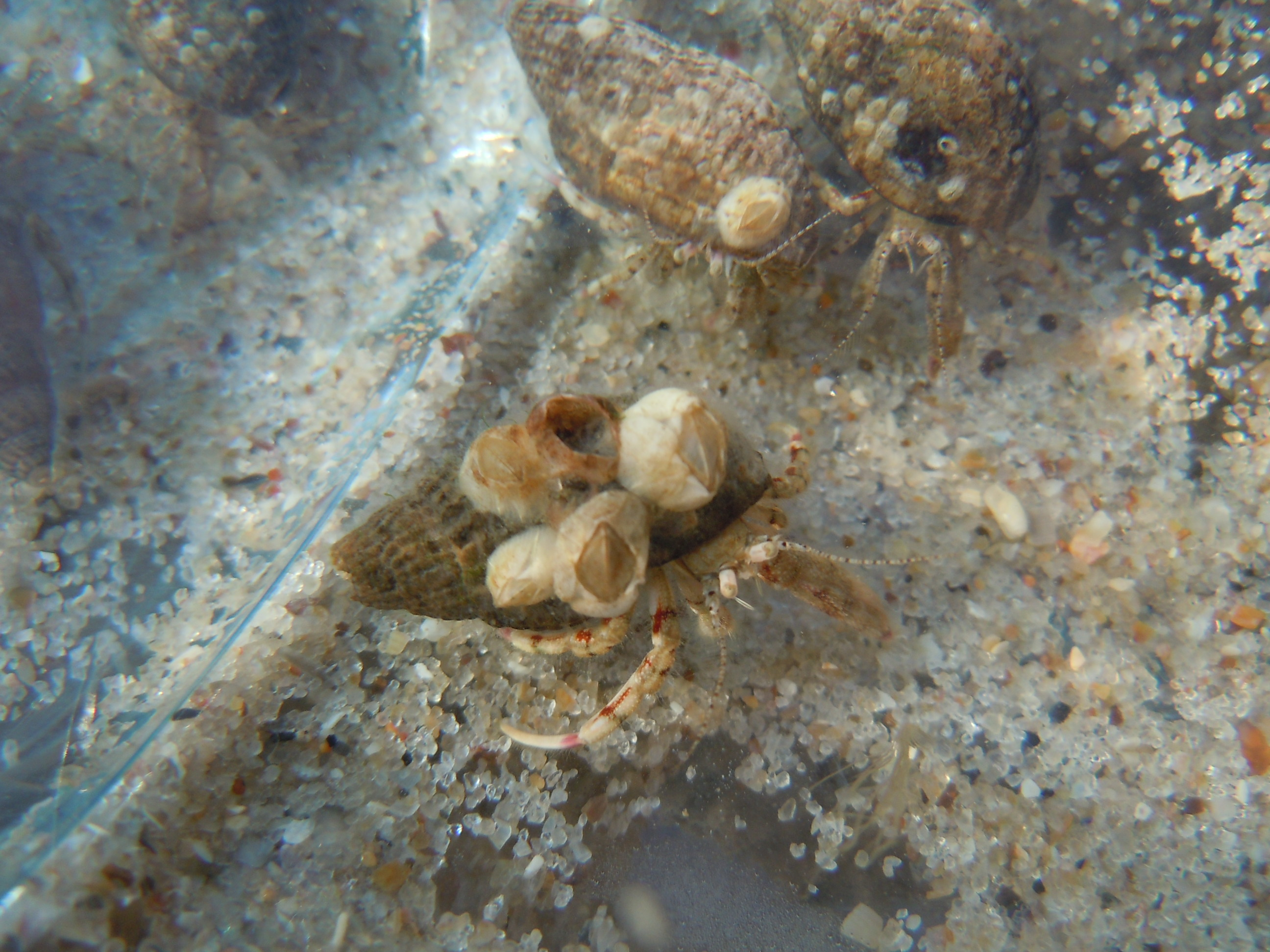
Live barnacles on a shell with the small hermit crab (Diogenes pugilator)

Amphibalanus improvisus is a filter feeder. It extends its six pairs of modified legs called cirri to catch plankton and other organic material floating past. It is a hermaphrodite and sperm is passed into the cavity of a neighbouring barnacle through a long penis. The eggs are fertilised and brooded in the cavity and hatch into nauplius larvae which drift with the currents. After six naupliar stages occupying two to five weeks, these become cyprid larvae and find a suitable surface on which to settle. Here they cement themselves to the substrate and undergo metamorphosis into juveniles. There may be several broods in the year but usually just two in the cooler waters of the Baltic and only one in low salinity environments.

== Control ==
Marine paints may contain an antifouling substance, the free base form of medetomidine, sold as Selektope. The anti-settling effect against the barnacle has been shown in vitro: When the barnacle cyprid larva encounters a surface containing medetomidine the molecule interacts with the octopamine receptor in the larva. This causes the settling larva to increase its kicking to more than 100 kicks per minute, which makes becoming sessile nearly impossible.
