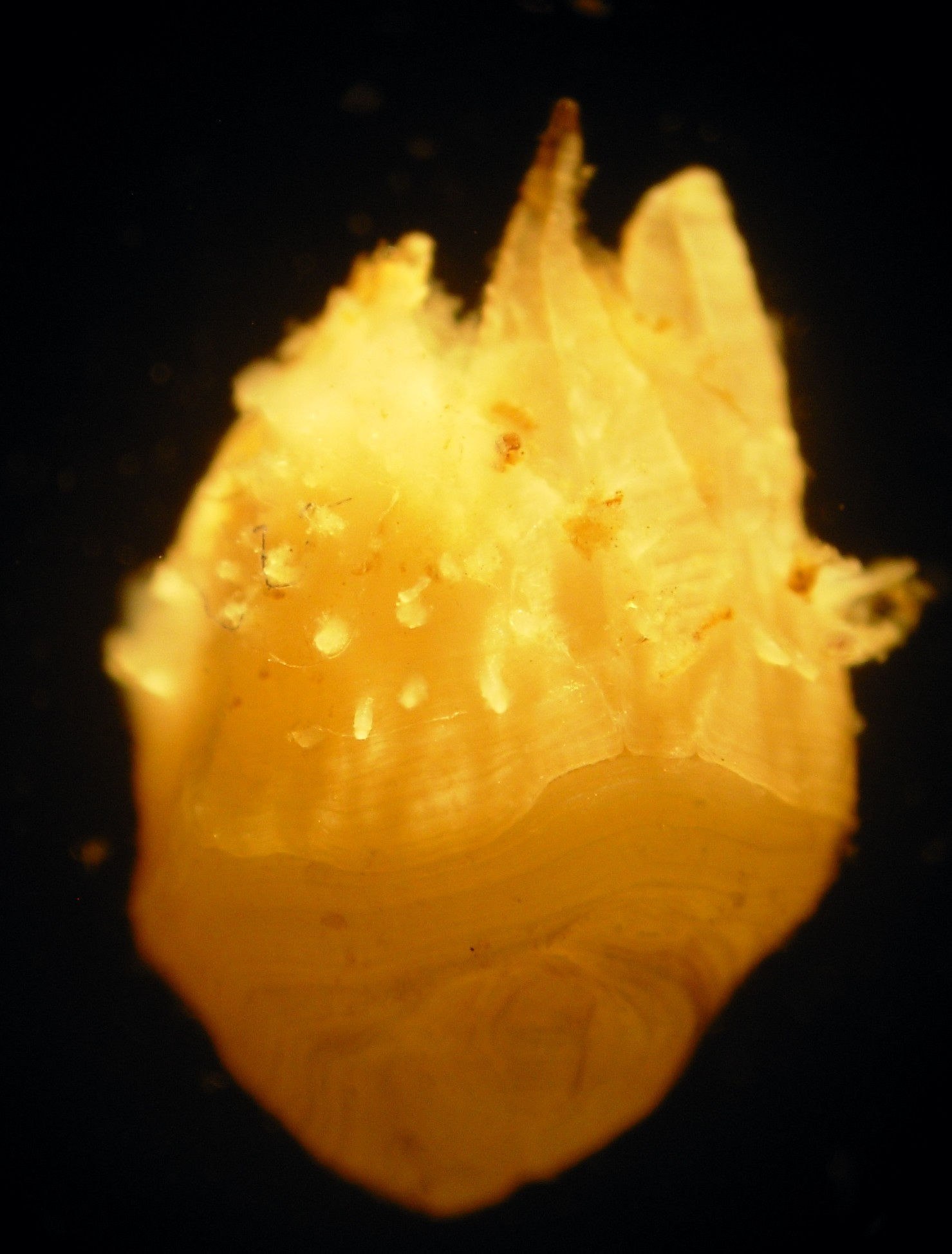
- Acasta spongites

Scientific classification
- Kingdom: Animalia
- Phylum: Arthropoda
- Clade: Pancrustacea
- Class: Thecostraca
- Subclass: Cirripedia
- Order: Balanomorpha
- Family: Balanidae
- Subfamily: Acastinae
- Genus: Acasta; Leach, 1817

= Acasta (crustacean) =

Genus of barnacles

Acasta is a genus of barnacles in the family Balanidae, containing the following species:

== Species ==
- Acasta alba Barnard, 1924
- Acasta alcyonicola Utinomi, 1953
- Acasta armata Gravier, 1921
- Acasta aspera Yu, Kolbasov, Hosie, Lee & Chan, 2017
- Acasta canaliculata (Ren & Liu, 1978)
- Acasta chejudoensis Kim & Kim, 1988
- Acasta clausa Yu, Chan, Achituv & Kolbasov, 2017
- Acasta conica Hoek, 1913
- Acasta coriolis Rosell, 1991
- Acasta crassa Broch, 1931
- Acasta cyathus Darwin, 1854 (sponge barnacle)
- Acasta daedalusa Kolbasov, 1993
- Acasta denticulata Hiro, 1931
- Acasta dentifer (Broch, 1922)
- Acasta echinata Hiro, 1937
- Acasta fenestrata Darwin, 1854
- Acasta flexuosa Nilsson-Cantell, 1931
- Acasta folliculus (Hiro, 1937)
- Acasta foraminifera Broch, 1931
- Acasta fragilis (Broch, 1931)
- Acasta gregaria Utinomi, 1959
- Acasta hirsuta Broch, 1916
- Acasta huangi Yu, Kolbasov, Hosie, Lee & Chan, 2017
- Acasta idiopoma Pilsbry, 1912
- Acasta infirma Kolbasov, 1992
- Acasta japonica Pilsbry, 1911
- Acasta koltuni Kolbasov, 1991
- Acasta longibasis (Hiro, 1937)
- Acasta madagascariensis Ren, 1989
- Acasta navicula (Darwin, 1854)
- Acasta newmani Van Syoc & Winther, 1999
- † Acasta fischeri Locard, 1877
- † Acasta formae de Alessandri, 1897
- † Acasta muricata Seguenza, 1876
