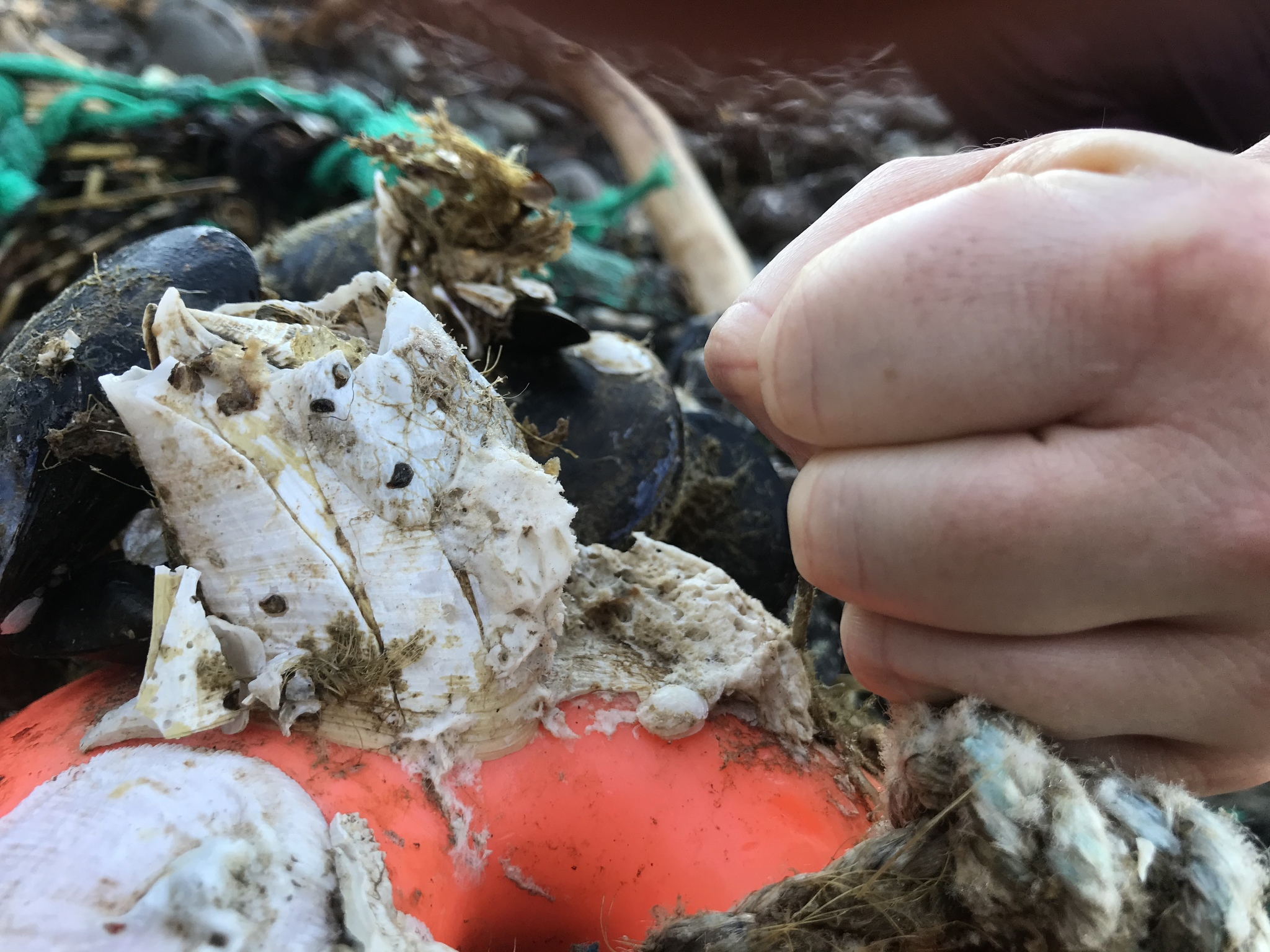
- Chirona hameri, Nova Scotia, Canada

Scientific classification
- Kingdom: Animalia
- Phylum: Arthropoda
- Class: Thecostraca
- Subclass: Cirripedia
- Order: Balanomorpha
- Family: Balanidae
- Subfamily: Archaeobalaninae
- Genus: Chirona; Gray, 1835

= Chirona =

Genus of crustaceans

Chirona is a genus of acorn barnacles in the family Balanidae. There are about six described species in Chirona.

== Species ==
These species belong to the genus Chirona:

- Chirona evermanni (Pilsbry, 1907)
- Chirona hameri (Ascanius, 1767)
- Chirona sublaevis (Sowerby, 1840)
- Chirona varians (Sowerby, 1846)
- † Chirona bimanicus (Withers, 1923)
- † Chirona unguiformis (Sowerby, 1846)
