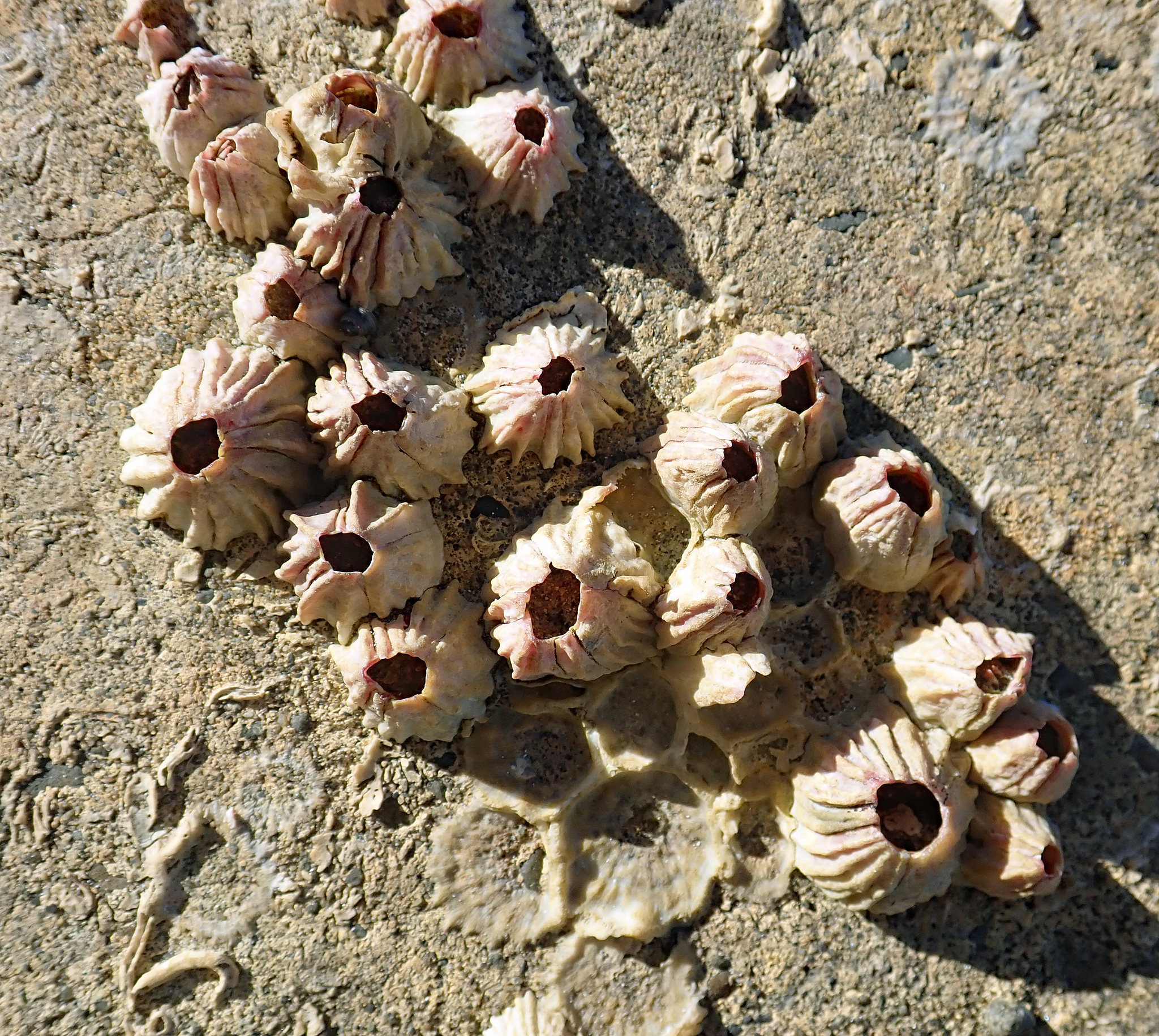
- Notobalanus vestitus, Chatham Islands, New Zealand

Scientific classification
- Kingdom: Animalia
- Phylum: Arthropoda
- Class: Thecostraca
- Subclass: Cirripedia
- Order: Balanomorpha
- Family: Balanidae
- Subfamily: Archaeobalaninae
- Genus: Notobalanus; Newman & Ross, 1976

= Notobalanus =

Genus of crustaceans

Notobalanus is a genus of acorn barnacles in the family Balanidae. There are at least two described species in Notobalanus.

== Species ==
These species belong to the genus Notobalanus:

- Notobalanus flosculus (Darwin, 1854)
- Notobalanus vestitus (Darwin, 1854)
