= Armatobalanus =

Scientific classification
- Kingdom: Animalia
- Phylum: Arthropoda
- Class: Thecostraca
- Subclass: Cirripedia
- Order: Balanomorpha
- Family: Balanidae
- Subfamily: Archaeobalaninae
- Genus: Armatobalanus; Hoek, 1913

Genus of barnacles

Armatobalanus is a genus of crustacean in family Balanidae. It contains at least the following species :

== Species ==
- Armatobalanus allium (Darwin, 1854)
- Armatobalanus arcuatus Hoek, 1913
- Armatobalanus californicus Zullo, 1967
- Armatobalanus cepa (Darwin, 1854)
- Armatobalanus filigranus (Broch, 1916)
- Armatobalanus motuketeketeensis Buckeridge, 1983
- Armatobalanus nefrens (Zullo, 1963)
- Armatobalanus nuagaonensis Carriol & Mohanti, 1993
- Armatobalanus quadrivittatus (Darwin, 1854)
- Armatobalanus quinquivittatus (Hoek, 1913)
- Armatobalanus terebratus (Darwin, 1854)
