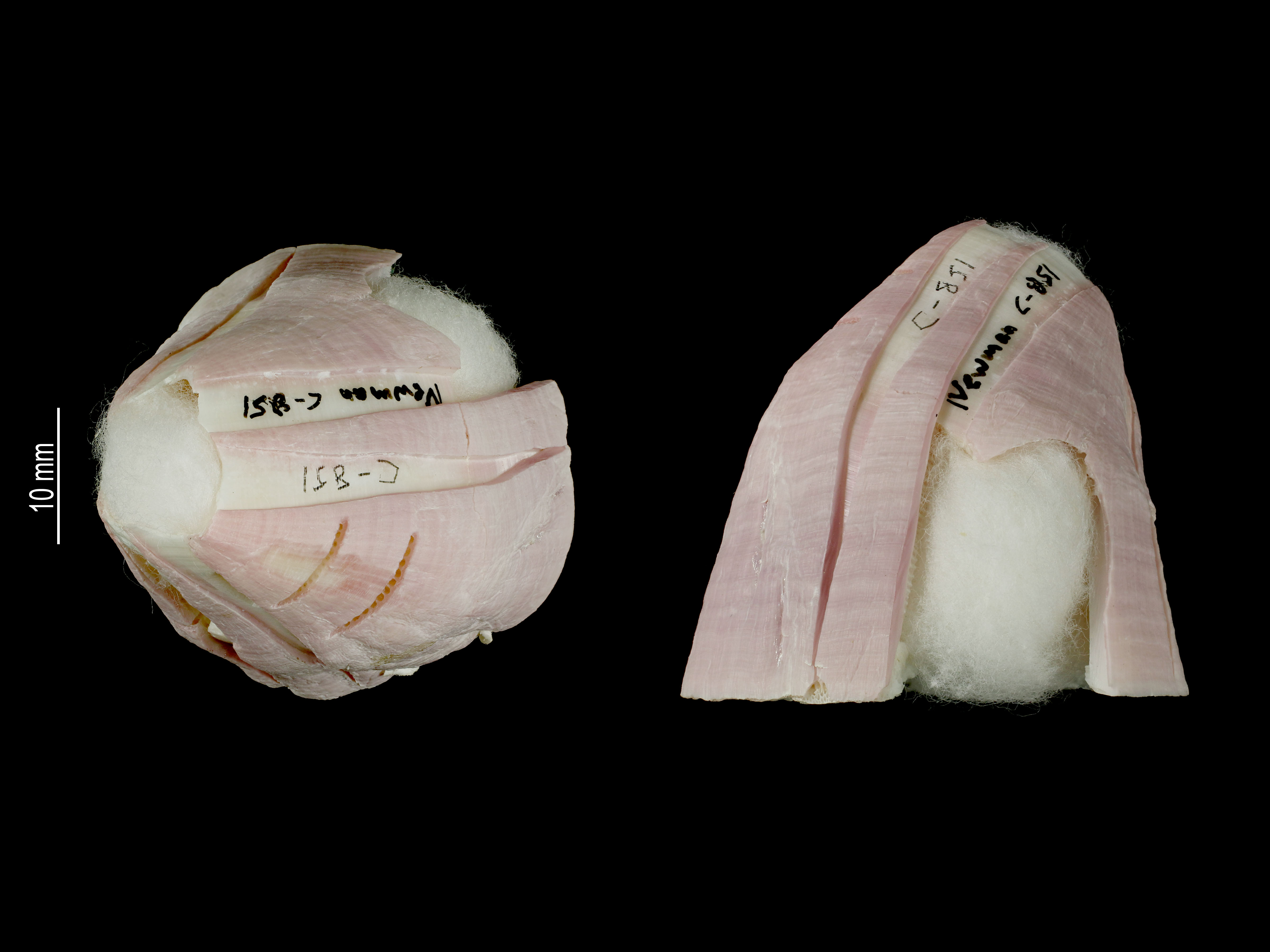
- Austromegabalanus zulloi (holotype at MNHN, Paris)

Scientific classification
- Kingdom: Animalia
- Phylum: Arthropoda
- Class: Thecostraca
- Subclass: Cirripedia
- Order: Balanomorpha
- Family: Balanidae
- Subfamily: Megabalaninae
- Genus: Austromegabalanus; Newman, 1979

= Austromegabalanus =

Austromegabalanus Temporal range: Late Pleistocene–recent

Genus of barnacles

Austromegabalanus is a genus of giant barnacles. It contains both extant and extinct species.

== Species ==
There are nine extant and fossil species:

- †Austromegabalanus carrioli Collareta et al., 2019
- Austromegabalanus cylindricus (Gmelin, 1780)
- Austromegabalanus isolde (Holthius & Silvertsen, 1967)
- Austromegabalanus kensleyi Pether, 1990
- Austromegabalanus nigrescens (Lamarck, 1818)
- †Austromegabalanus piscoensis Carriol et al., 1987
- Austromegabalanus psittacus (Molina, 1788)
- †Austromegabalanus victoriensis Buckeridge, 1983
- Austromegabalanus zulloi Newman, 1979
