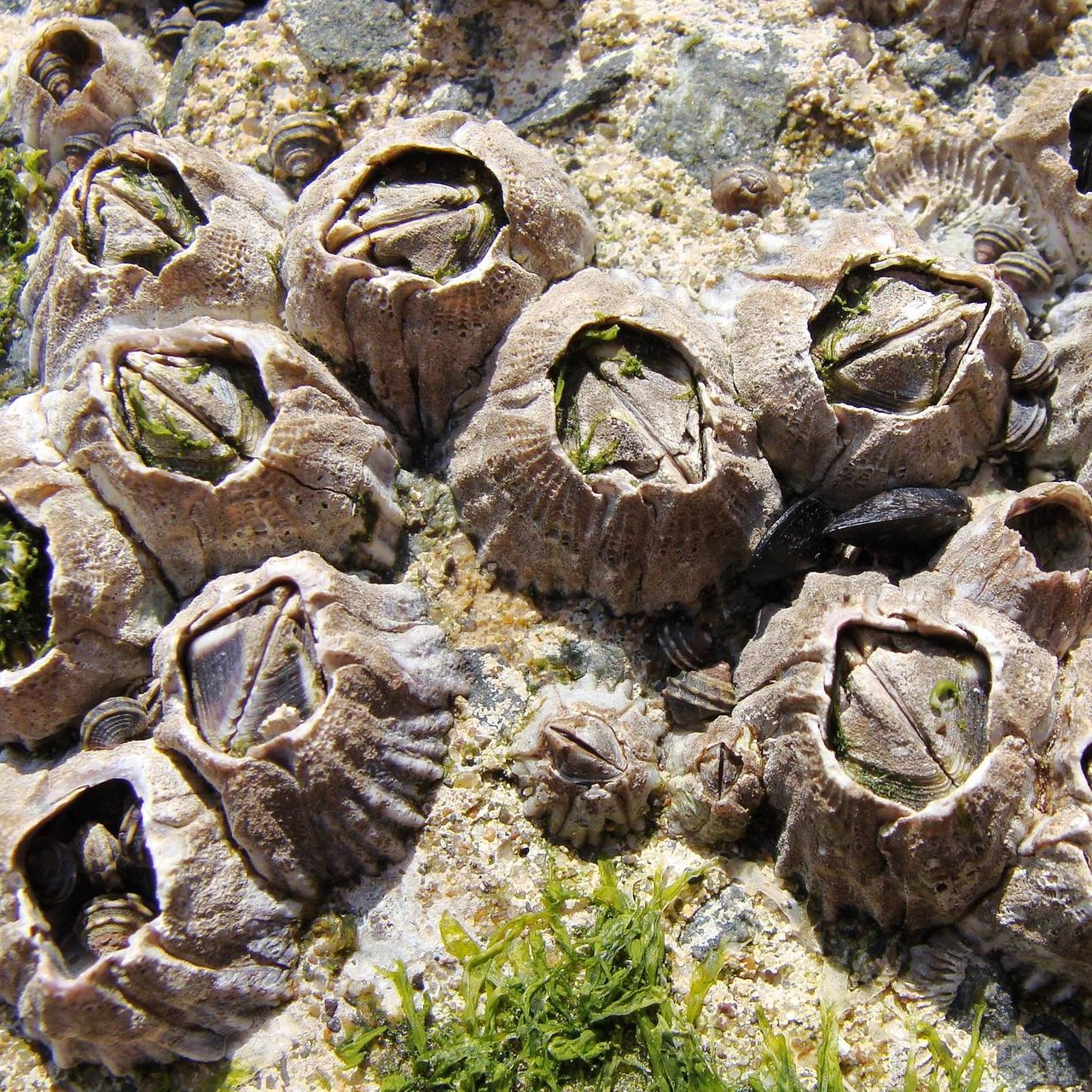

Scientific classification
- Kingdom: Animalia
- Phylum: Arthropoda
- Class: Thecostraca
- Subclass: Cirripedia
- Order: Balanomorpha
- Family: Balanidae
- Genus: Fistulobalanus
- Species: F. albicostatus

Binomial name
- Fistulobalanus albicostatus (Pilsbry, 1916)

Synonyms
- Balanus albicostatus Pilsbry, 1916

= Fistulobalanus albicostatus =

Species of barnacle

Fistulobalanus albicostatus is a species of barnacle in the family Balanidae.
