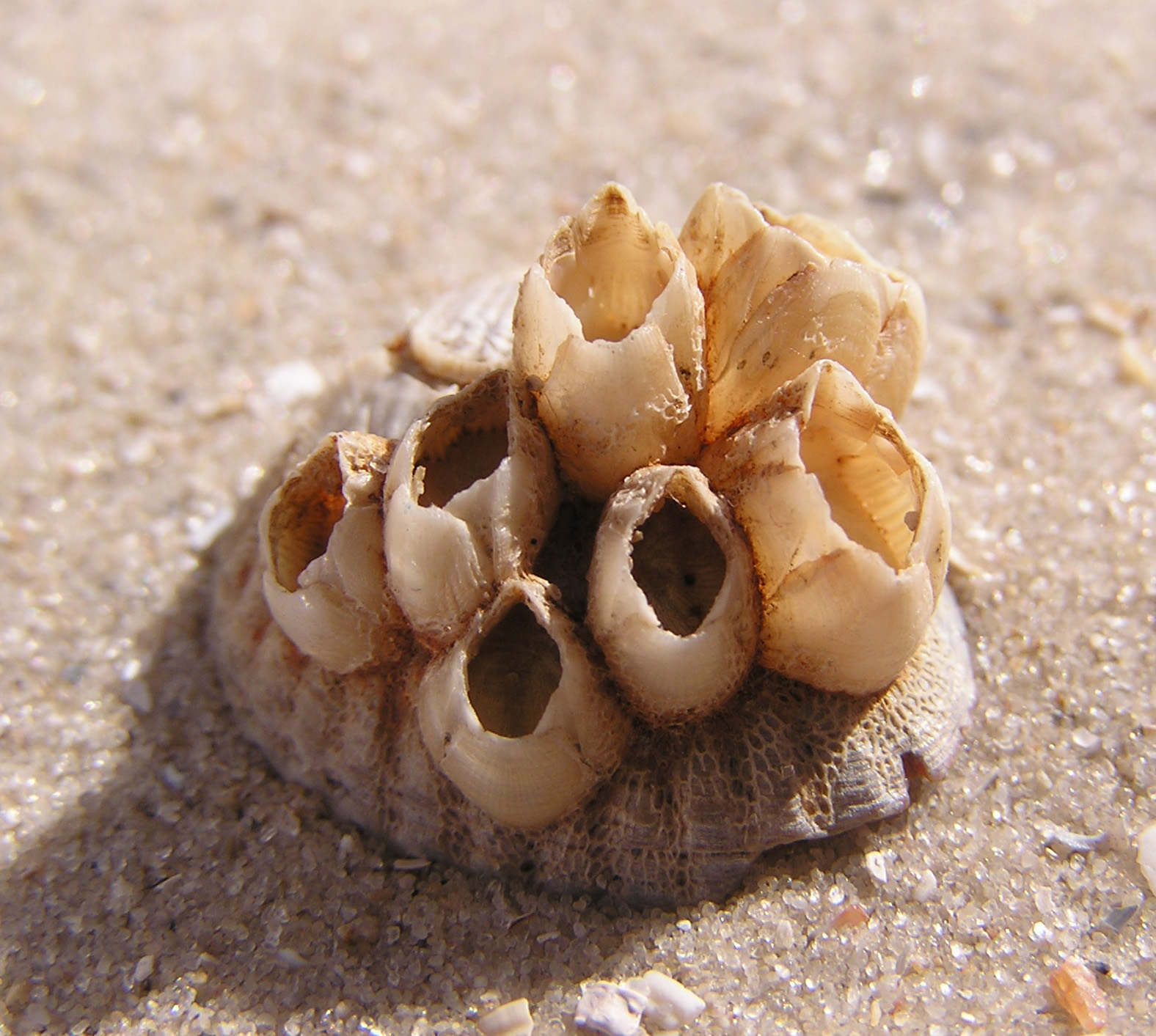
- Amphibalanus improvisus

Scientific classification
- Kingdom: Animalia
- Phylum: Arthropoda
- Class: Thecostraca
- Subclass: Cirripedia
- Order: Balanomorpha
- Family: Balanidae
- Subfamily: Amphibalaninae
- Genus: Amphibalanus; Pitombo, 2004

Species
- See text

= Amphibalanus =

Genus of barnacles

Amphibalanus is a genus of barnacle of the family Balanidae that includes species formerly assigned to Balanus. It contains the following species:

== Species ==
- Amphibalanus amphitrite (Darwin, 1854)
- †Amphibalanus caboblanquensis (Weisbord, 1966) (extinct)
- †Amphibalanus caribensis (Weisbord, 1966) (extinct)
- Amphibalanus cirratus (Darwin, 1854)
- Amphibalanus eburneus (Gould, 1841)
- †Amphibalanus halosydne (Zullo & Katuna, 1992) (extinct)
- †Amphibalanus hopkinsi (Zullo, 1968) (extinct)
- Amphibalanus improvisus (Darwin, 1854)
- †Amphibalanus itoigawai (Karasawa & Kobayashi, 2025) (extinct)
- Amphibalanus inexpectatus (Pilsbry, 1916)
- Amphibalanus peruvianus (Pilsbry, 1909)
- †Amphibalanus playagrandensis (Weisbord, 1966) (extinct)
- Amphibalanus poecilotheca (Kruger, 1911)
- †Amphibalanus reflexus (Zullo, 1984) (extinct)
- Amphibalanus reticulatus (Utinomi, 1967)
- Amphibalanus rhizophorae (Ren & Liu, 1989)
- Amphibalanus salaami (Nilsson-Cantell, 1932)
- Amphibalanus subalbidus (Henry, 1973)
- Amphibalanus thailandicus (Puspasari, Yamaguchi & Angsupanich, 2001)
- Amphibalanus variegatus (Darwin, 1854)
- Amphibalanus venustus (Darwin, 1854)
- Amphibalanus zhujiangensis (Ren, 1989)
