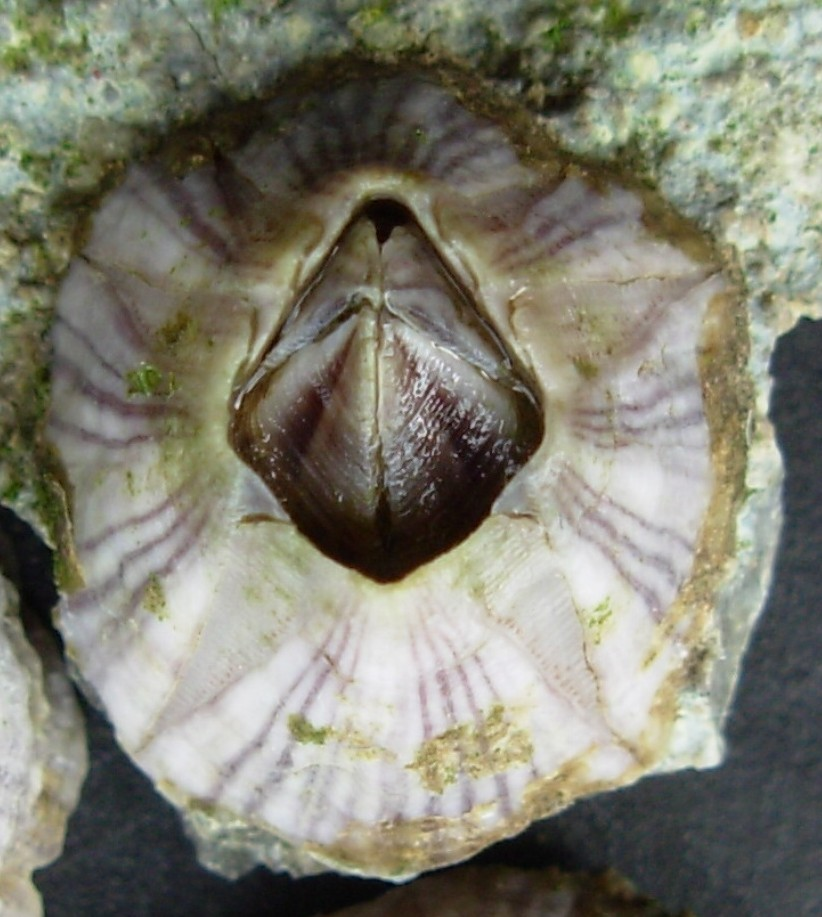

Scientific classification
- Domain: Eukaryota
- Kingdom: Animalia
- Phylum: Arthropoda
- Class: Thecostraca
- Subclass: Cirripedia
- Order: Balanomorpha
- Family: Balanidae
- Genus: Amphibalanus
- Species: A. amphitrite

Binomial name
- Amphibalanus amphitrite Darwin, 1854

= Amphibalanus amphitrite =

Species of barnacle

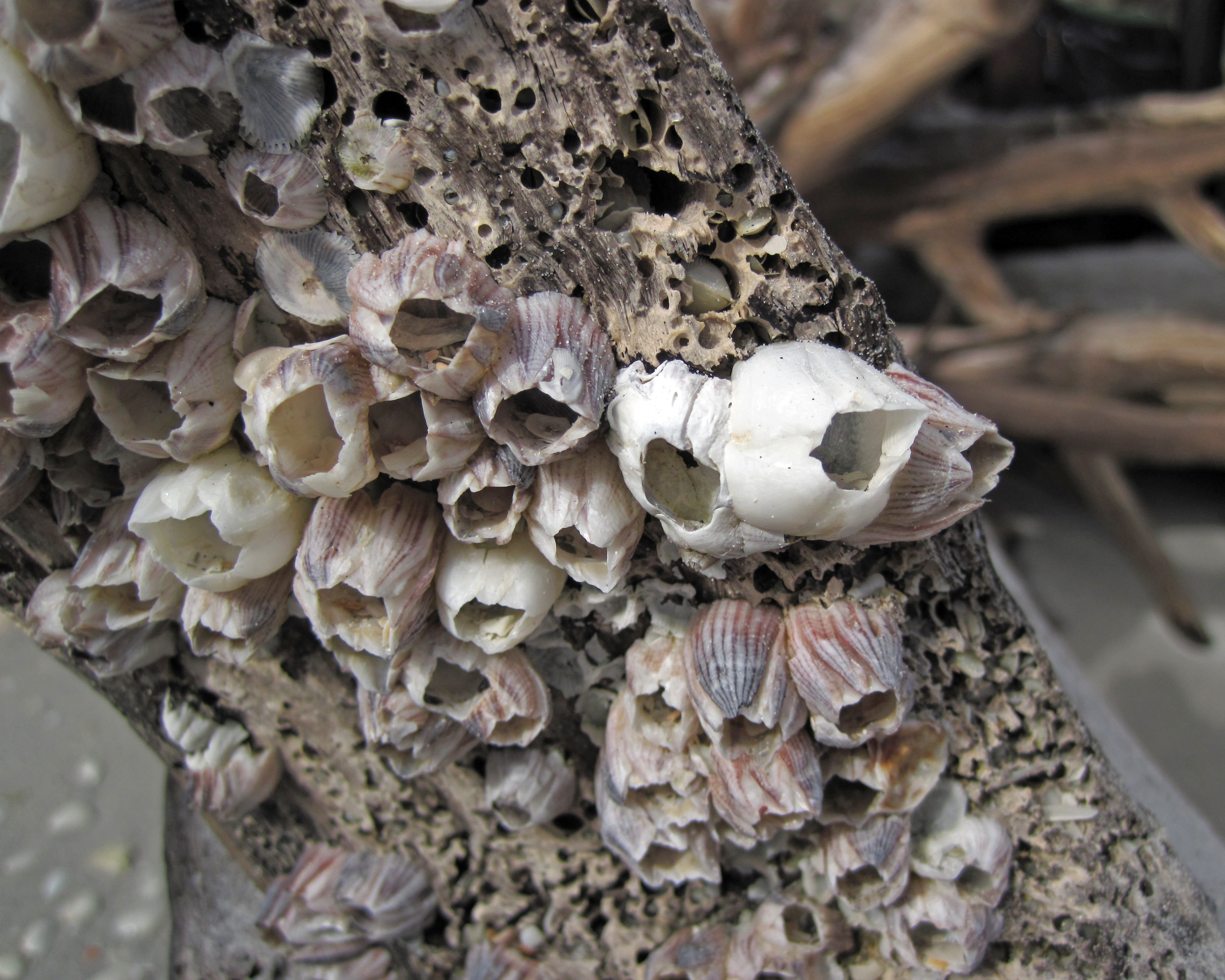
A. amphitrite and Balanus eburneus (ivory acorn barnacles), Cayo Costa State Park, Florida

Amphibalanus amphitrite is a species of acorn barnacle in the Balanidae family. Its common names include the striped barnacle, the purple acorn barnacle and Amphitrite's rock barnacle. It is found in warm and temperate waters worldwide.

== Description ==
A. amphitrite is a medium-sized, cone-shaped sessile barnacle with distinctive narrow vertical purple or brown stripes. The surface of the test has vertical ribbing. It has a diamond-shaped operculum protected by a movable lid formed from two triangular plates. It grows to about twenty millimetres in diameter.

== Distribution ==
It is uncertain where A. amphitrite originated but it may have been in the Indian Ocean or southwestern Pacific Ocean as fossils of the species have been found in these regions. It has now spread to most of the warm and temperate seas of the world.

== Habitat ==
A. amphitrite is a common coastal and estuarine organism found on hard natural surfaces such as bedrock, boulders, mollusc shells and red mangrove roots. It is also found on artificial surfaces such as the hulls of ships, pilings and seawalls. It can be very abundant, with over three hundred individual barnacles being recorded on a single oyster (Crassostrea virginica).

== Biology ==
A. amphitrite is a model organism for studies of fundamental and applied larval settlement. This is due to its invasive behaviour, its worldwide distribution and the ease with which it can be bred in the laboratory. Its genome has been sequenced.

A. amphitrite is a hermaphrodite and individuals have both male and female reproductive organs. Sperm is introduced into the mantle cavities of adjacent barnacles through an elongated penis and the fertilised eggs are brooded within the mantle cavity for several months. Free-swimming larvae called nauplii are then released into the water column where they become part of the zooplankton. In temperate areas, spawning is mainly in the spring and summer but in warmer waters it may continue throughout the year. Individuals can release up to ten thousand eggs per brood and there may be many broods per year. After several moults the last larval stage, the cyprid larva, settles and crawls around looking for a suitable place to cement itself. It does this with a matrix of proteins secreted by the antennae.

For feeding, A. amphitrite has specialized paired appendages called cirri. These are used to sieve food particles from the water and transfer them to the mouth. They are oriented perpendicular to the general flow direction of the water and the rates of movement vary with the availability of food so as to maximize particle intake.

A. amphitrite can tolerate low salinity levels in estuaries but appears to need higher levels in order to breed. It can also tolerate temperatures as low as 12 °C but needs temperatures of at least 15 °C to breed which limits its northerly spread.

== Fouling ==
A. amphitrite is part of the biofouling community. The larvae settle out on and colonise the hulls of ships, harbour structures, buoys and the inflow pipes of desalination plants. These become covered with barnacles and other associated hard fouling species. Metal structures become corroded and maintenance costs are increased. The fouling also causes friction between the water and the hulls of ships and this reduces efficiency and increases fuel costs.
