= Arossia =

Scientific classification
- Domain: Eukaryota
- Kingdom: Animalia
- Phylum: Arthropoda
- Class: Thecostraca
- Subclass: Cirripedia
- (unranked): Sessilia
- Order: Balanomorpha
- Superfamily: Balanoidea
- Family: Balanidae
- Genus: Arossia; Newman, 1982

Genus of crustaceans

Arossia is a genus of barnacles belonging to the family Balanidae.

The species of this genus are found in Northern and Central America.

== Species ==
- Arossia ashleyensis (Zullo, 1986)
- Arossia aurae Zullo, 1992
- Arossia bohaska Kline, 1997
- Arossia cummembrana Kline, 1997
- Arossia eyerdami (Henry, 1960)
- Arossia glyptopoma (Pilsbry, 1916)
- Arossia henryae (Newman, 1982)
- Arossia newmani Zullo, 1992
- Arossia panamensis (Rogers, 1948)
- Arossia rubra Zullo, 1992
- Arossia sendaica (Hatai, Masuda & Noda, 1976)
