= Menesiniella =

Scientific classification
- Kingdom: Animalia
- Phylum: Arthropoda
- Class: Thecostraca
- Subclass: Cirripedia
- Order: Balanomorpha
- Family: Balanidae
- Subfamily: Concavinae
- Genus: Menesiniella; Newman, 1982

Genus of barnacles

Menesiniella is a genus of barnacle in the family Balanidae that includes the following species:

- Menesiniella advena Zullo, 1992
- Menesiniella aquila (Pilsbry, 1907)
- Menesiniella regalis (Pilsbry, 1916)
