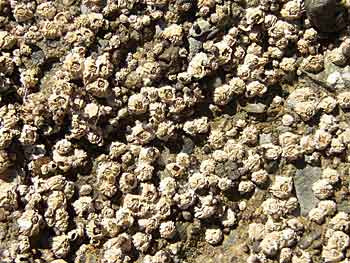
- Balanus glandula

Scientific classification
- Kingdom: Animalia
- Phylum: Arthropoda
- Class: Thecostraca
- Subclass: Cirripedia
- Superorder: Thoracicalcarea
- (unranked): Sessilia
- Order: Balanomorpha
- Superfamily: Balanoidea
- Family: Balanidae; Leach, 1817

= Balanidae =

Family of barnacles

The Balanidae is a family of barnacles of the order Balanomorpha. As a result of research published in 2021 by Chan et al., the members of the family Archaeobalanidae were merged with this family.

== Genera ==
These genera belong to the family Balanidae:

- Acasta Leach, 1817
- Actinobalanus Moroni, 1967
- Amphibalanus Pitombo, 2004
- Archiacasta Kolbasov, 1993
- Armatobalanus Hoek, 1913
- Arossia Newman, 1982
- Austromegabalanus Newman, 1979
- Balanus Costa, 1778 (barnacle)
- Bathybalanus Hoek, 1913
- Bryozobia Ross & Newman, 1996
- Chesaconcavus Zullo, 1992
- Chirona Gray, 1835
- Concavus Newman, 1982
- Conopea Say, 1822
- Eoatria Van Syoc & Newman, 2010
- Euacasta Kolbasov, 1993
- Fistulobalanus Zullo, 1984
- Fosterella Buckeridge, 1983
- Hesperibalanus Pilsbry, 1916
- Hexacreusia Zullo, 1961
- Megabalanus Hoek, 1913
- Membranobalanus Hoek, 1913
- Menesiniella Newman, 1982
- Microporatria Van Syoc & Newman, 2010
- Multatria Van Syoc & Newman, 2010
- Neoacasta Kolbasov, 1993
- Notobalanus Newman & Ross, 1976
- Notomegabalanus Newman, 1979
- Paraconcavus Zullo, 1992
- Pectinoacasta Kolbasov, 1993
- Perforatus Pitombo, 2004
- Poratria Van Syoc & Newman, 2010
- Pseudoacasta Nilsson-Cantell, 1930
- Semibalanus Pilsbry, 1916
- Solidobalanus Hoek, 1913
- Striatobalanus Hoek, 1913
- Tamiosoma Conrad, 1857
- Tasmanobalanus Buckeridge, 1983
- Tetrabalanus Cornwall, 1941
- Wanella Anderson, 1993
- Zulloa Ross & Newman, 1996
- Zulloana Pitombo & Ross, 2002
- † Alessandriella Carriol & Cahuzac, 2001
- † Archaeobalanus Menesini, 1971
- † Kathpalmeria Ross, 1965
- † Palaeobalanus Buckeridge, 1983
- † Paractinobalanus Carriol, 2008
- † Porobalanus Buckeridge, 2015
- † Zullobalanus Buckeridge, 1989
- † Zulloconcavus Carriol, 2000
