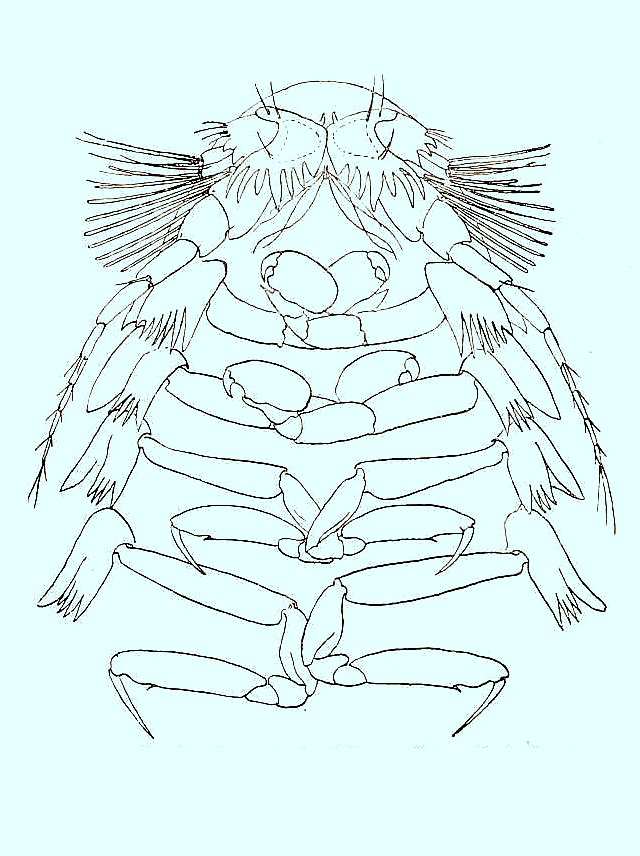

Scientific classification
- Kingdom: Animalia
- Phylum: Arthropoda
- Class: Malacostraca
- Order: Isopoda
- Family: Hemioniscidae
- Genus: Hemioniscus
- Species: H. balani

Binomial name
- Hemioniscus balani Buchholtz, 1866

= Hemioniscus balani =

Species of crustacean

Hemioniscus balani, a species of isopod crustacean, is a widespread parasitic castrator of barnacles in the northern Atlantic Ocean. Its range extends from Norway to the Atlantic coast of France, and as far west as Massachusetts. It is also commonly found on the Pacific coast of North America; it is not known if the Pacific and Atlantic populations are the same species, or if the Pacific population exists following human-assisted introduction.

== Life history ==
Hemioniscus balani parasitically castrates adults of several species of barnacles, including Semibalanus balanoides, Chthamalus fissus, Chthamalus dalli, and Balanus glandula. Rarely does more than one H. balani parasitize the same host, but under conditions of heavy infestation, a single barnacle may contain as many as seven H. balani individuals.

Both the isopod parasite and its barnacle host are hermaphroditic crustaceans with a free-swimming larva and a sessile adult. H. balani is a protandrous hermaphrodite that develops into a female only after attaching to its adult host. While in its male swimming form, it resembles a typical isopod with antennae, jointed limbs, and a segmented exoskeleton. When fully mature, the adult female form of H. balani is reduced to a bloated, star-shaped egg sac, up to 8 mm in length inhabiting the mantle cavity of its barnacle host.

The barnacle host species are simultaneous hermaphrodites, with both male and female gonads in each adult. H. balani feeds on its host's ovarian fluid, so the barnacle loses female reproductive ability, but can still produce sperm.
