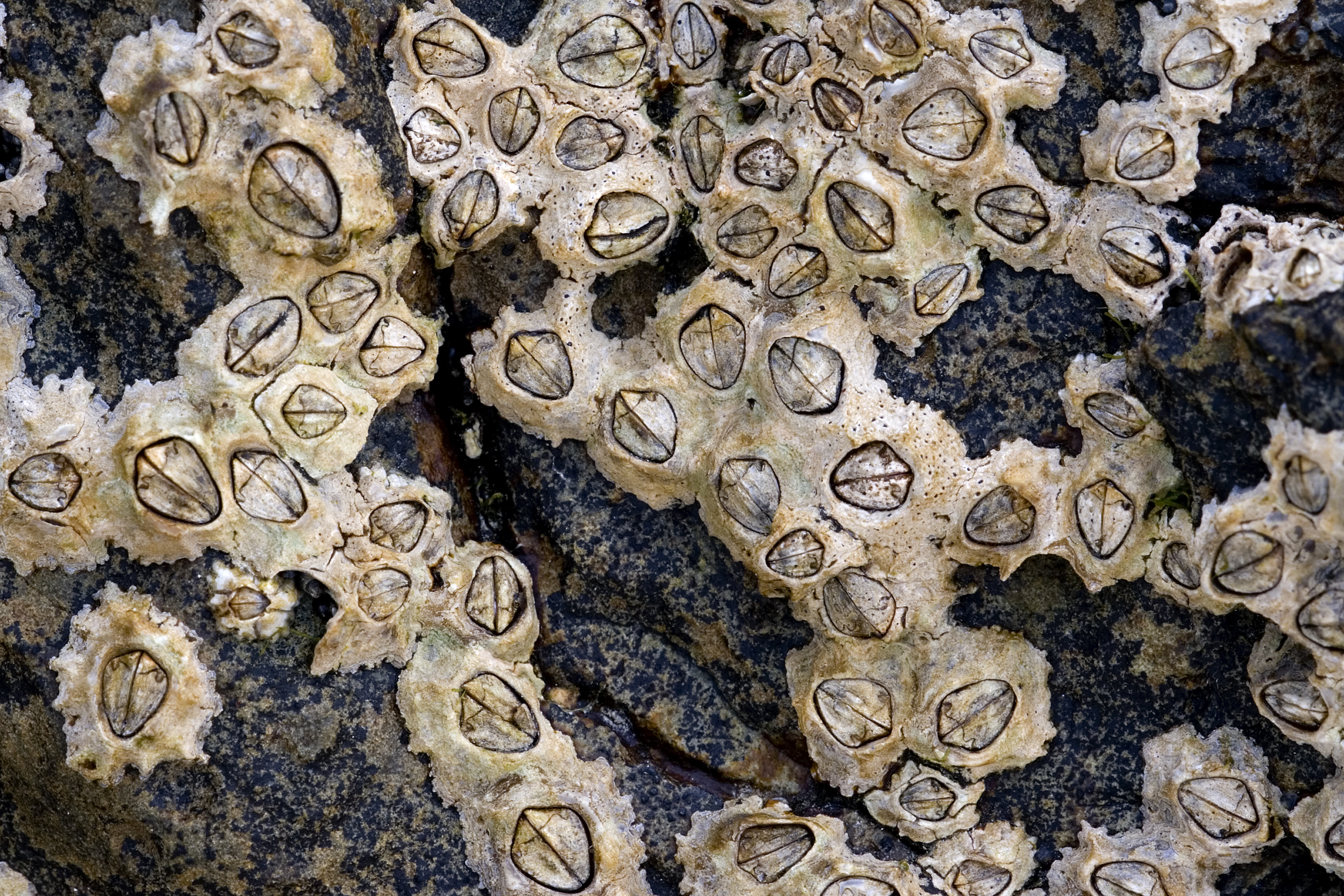
- A colony of C. stellatus

Scientific classification
- Domain: Eukaryota
- Kingdom: Animalia
- Phylum: Arthropoda
- Class: Thecostraca
- Subclass: Cirripedia
- Order: Balanomorpha
- Family: Chthamalidae
- Genus: Chthamalus
- Species: C. stellatus

Binomial name
- Chthamalus stellatus (Poli, 1791)

= Chthamalus stellatus =

Species of barnacle

Chthamalus stellatus, common name Poli's stellate barnacle, is a species of acorn barnacle common on rocky shores in South West England, Ireland, and Southern Europe. It is named after Giuseppe Saverio Poli.

== Description ==
C. stellatus is a sessile barnacle that attaches to rocks and other firm materials in the intertidal zone using its membranous base. It is basically cone-shaped but can assume a more tubular shape in a crowded colony. Like other sessile barnacles, as an adult C. stellatus is a suspension feeder that stays in its fixed shell and uses its feathery, rhythmically beating appendages – actually modified legs – to draw plankton and detritus into its shell for consumption.

The chalky white shell of C. stellatus has a kite-shaped opercular opening when it is a juvenile and an oval operculum opening when it is an adult. The shell is made up of six solid wall plates of approximately equal size. Its relatively narrow rostral plates remain separate from its rostrolateral plates and do not fuse. C. stellatus has bright blue tissue with black and orange markings which can be seen when its opercular aperture is not tightly closed. Depending upon environmental conditions and the amount of food available, it can reach up to 14 millimetres (0.55 in) in diameter.

== Reproduction ==
Like most barnacles, C. stellatus is hermaphroditic and capable of self-fertilisation when isolated, but individuals typically take on either a male or female role in order to mate. Their penises are significantly longer than their bodies and are used by the stationary "functional males" to search the area for an equally stationary "functional female" neighbour to fertilise.

Barnacles of this species produce about 1,000 to 4,000 eggs per brood when functioning as female. The fertilised eggs remain inside the shell of the adult until they are released as nauplii, free swimming larvae which float on currents along with other plankton. After several moults they metamorphose into a cyprid, a stage at which they cannot feed. The cyprid swims in search of a suitable surface on which to attach itself, head first, in order to metamorphose into the familiar, hard-shelled, immobile form. The duration of its breeding season can be temperature dependent, and it produces fewer broods near the northern limit of its range.

== Habitat and range ==
C. stellatus attaches to exposed rocky shores in the mid to low eulittoral zone in the northeastern Atlantic Ocean. It especially favours islands and headlands as opposed to bays and more protected areas. It is a southern, warm-water species but has been discovered as far north as Shetland and as far east as the Isle of Wight. A 2021 examination of specimens from the Cape Verde Islands revealed that while they were morphologically similar to C. stellatus, genetic differences between them are larger than those found between different species of Chthamalus, potentially justifying assignment of these populations as an evolutionarily significant unit and sister clade to C. stellatus.

The vertical distribution of C. stellatus overlaps with Chthamalus montagui (considered the same species as C. stellatus until 1976) and Semibalanus balanoides with the specific prevalence of one species over another in a given locale possibly related to differences in the distribution of the species' larval stages.
