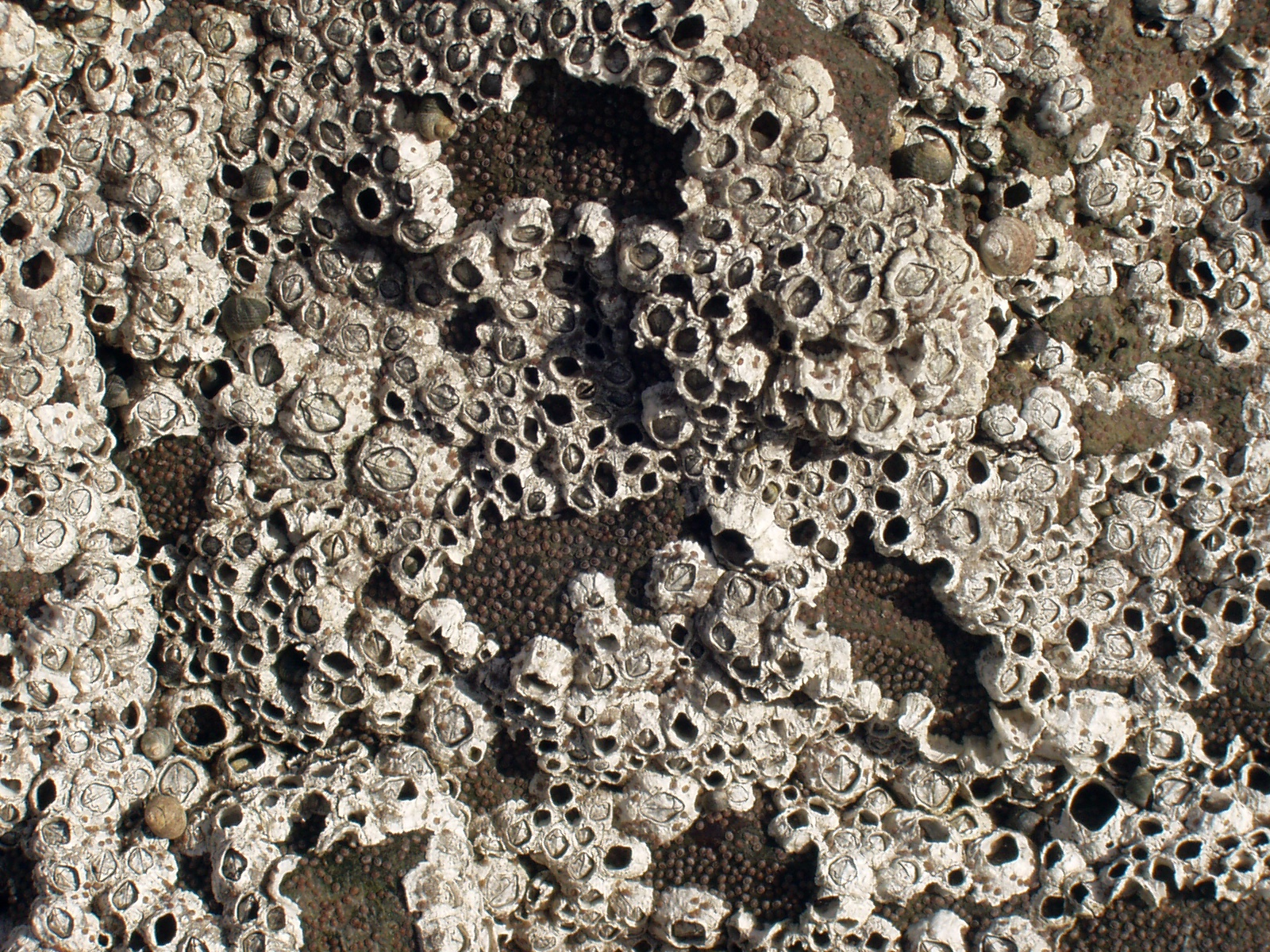

Scientific classification
- Kingdom: Animalia
- Phylum: Arthropoda
- Class: Thecostraca
- Subclass: Cirripedia
- Order: Balanomorpha
- Family: Balanidae
- Genus: Semibalanus
- Species: S. balanoides

Binomial name
- Semibalanus balanoides (Linnaeus, 1767)

Synonyms
- Balanus balanoides Linnaeus, 1767

= Semibalanus balanoides =

Species of barnacle

Semibalanus balanoides (common barnacle, common rock barnacle, or northern rock barnacle) is a common and widespread boreo-arctic species of acorn barnacle. It is common on rocks and other substrates in the intertidal zone of north-western Europe and both coasts of North America.

== Description ==
Adult S. balanoides grow up to 15 millimetres (0.6 in) in diameter, and are sessile, living attached to rocks and other solid substrates. They have six greyish wall plates surrounding a diamond-shaped operculum. The base of the shell is membranous in Semibalanus, unlike other barnacles which have calcified bases. When the tide rises to cover the barnacles, the operculum opens, and feathery cirri (modified thoracic appendages) are extended into the water to filter food from the seawater. When the tide falls, the operculum closes again to prevent desiccation; the reduction from the primitive condition of eight wall plates to six is believed to decrease water loss even further by reducing the number of sutures through which water can escape.

== Distribution ==
Semibalanus balanoides is found in the intertidal zone in the world's northern oceans. Its distribution is limited in the north by the extent of the pack-ice and in the south by increasing temperature which prevents maturation of gametes. The mean monthly temperature of the sea must drop below 7.2 °C (45.0 °F) for it to breed.

In Europe, S. balanoides is found on Svalbard and from Finnmark to north-west Spain but excluding part of the Bay of Biscay. It is common throughout the British Isles, except in parts of Cornwall, the Scilly Isles and south-western Ireland. On the North American coast of the Atlantic Ocean, it reaches as far south as Cape Hatteras, North Carolina, and on the Pacific coast, it reaches as far south as British Columbia. S. balanoides is the most common and widespread intertidal barnacle in the British Isles, and the only intertidal barnacle of the north-east coast of North America.

== Ecology ==
Semibalanus balanoides can be the dominant species of rocky shores, where it grows in a range of situations, from very sheltered to very exposed. It is typically found lower on the shore than another barnacle, Chthamalus montagui, although with some overlap. S. balanoides can tolerate salinities down to 20 psu, allowing it to colonise parts of estuaries. On semi-exposed shores, S. balanoides may form a patchwork with patches of seaweeds, such as Fucus serratus, and limpets; the fronds of the seaweeds brush the barnacle larvae from the rocks, allowing limpets to colonise it instead. At the southern limit of its range, including Cornwall, S. balanoides is replaced by Chthamalus montagui. Although capable of living in the sublittoral zone, S. balanoides tends to be restricted to the intertidal by predation and by competition from species such as the blue mussel, Mytilus edulis, and the algae Ascophyllum nodosum and Chondrus crispus.

== Life cycle ==
=== Feeding ===
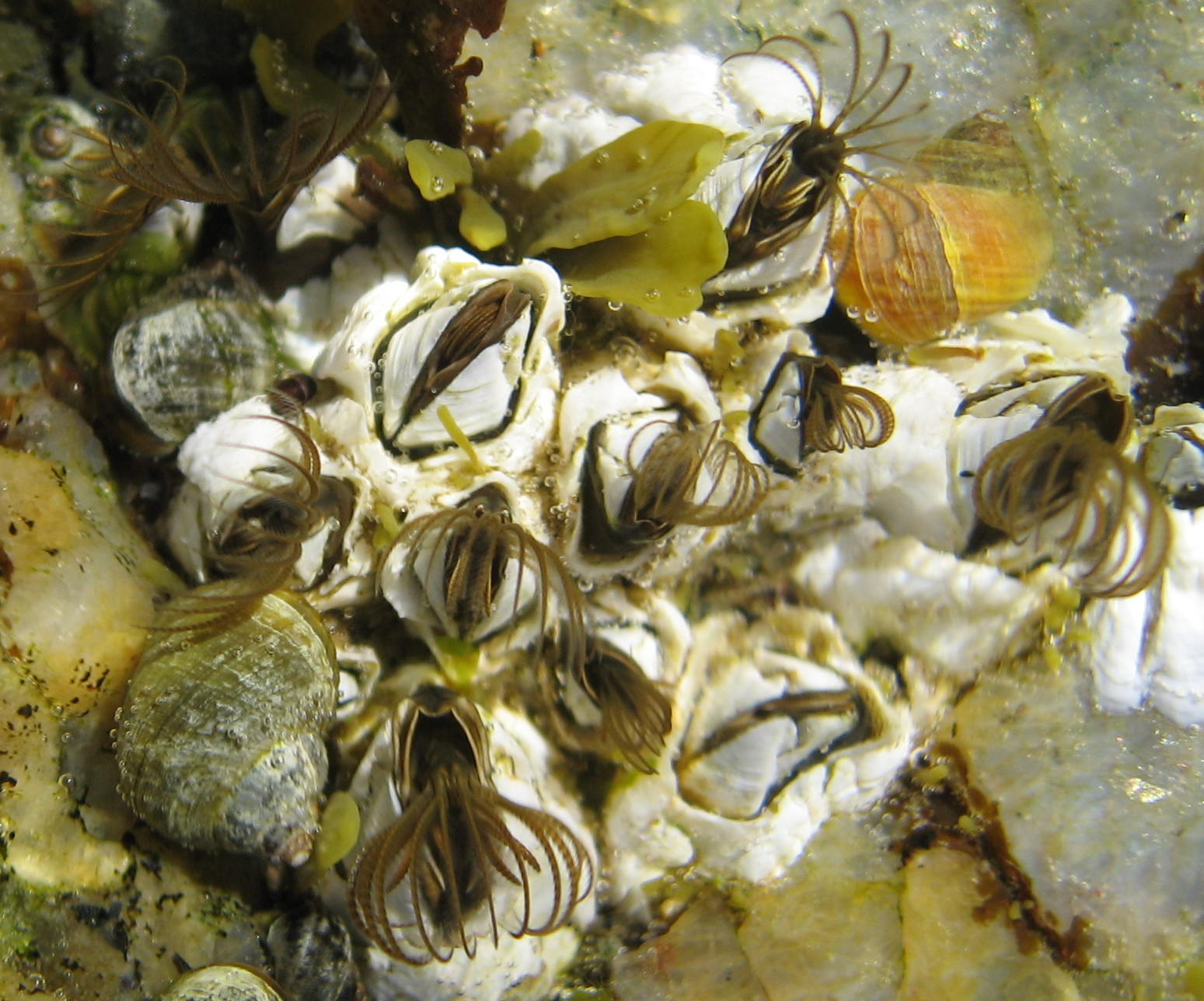
S. balanoides feeding, Upernavik, Greenland

Semibalanus balanoides is a filter feeder, using its thoracic appendages, or cirri, to capture zooplankton and detritus from the water. If there is a current, then the barnacle holds its cirri stiffly into the flow, but when there is no current, the barnacle beats its cirri rhythmically. Plankton levels are highest in Spring and Autumn, and drop significantly during Winter, when the barnacles are dependent on reserves of food which they have stored.

=== Reproduction ===
Breeding takes place in winter at an optimal temperature of 14 °C (57 °F). S. balanoides is hermaphroditic, but cannot fertilise itself. Gametes are transferred with a penis which may be up to 7.5 centimetres (3.0 in) long; barnacles that are further apart than about 5 cm (2.0 in) are therefore unable to reproduce together. One barnacle may inseminate another up to eight times, and up to six concurrent penetrations may occur. The penis degenerates after copulation, and a new one is regrown the following year. Up to 10,000 eggs may be produced, and they are stored in sacs within the shell cavity. While the eggs are developing, the adult barnacle does not moult. The eggs hatch into nauplius larvae, which have three pairs of legs, one pair of antennae and a single eye and are released to coincide with the spring algal bloom. These spend several weeks in the water column, feeding on plankton. Over a series of moults, the larva passes through six naupliar instars before changing into a cypris larva, with a two-valved carapace. These larvae can survive weeks embedded in sea ice. The cypris larva does not feed but seeks out a suitable substrate for its adult life. Having settled on a substrate, the larva examines the area until it finds another barnacle of the same species and then attaches itself to the substrate with its antennae, whereupon it metamorphoses into the adult. Sexual maturity is usually only reached after two years, and adults of S. balanoides may live for up to seven years, depending on their position on the shore.

=== Parasites and predators ===
Predators of Semibalanus balanoides include the whelk Nucella lapillus, the shanny Lipophrys pholis, the sea star Asterias vulgaris, and nudibranchs. Although they have no eyes, barnacles are aware of changes in light, and withdraw into their shells when threatened. Parasites of S. balanus include Pyxinoides balani, a protozoan which lives in the barnacle's midgut, and Epistylis horizontalis, a ciliate which lives on the gills. The isopod Hemioniscus balani occurs from France to the Faroe Islands and the Oslofjord, and from Labrador to Massachusetts, and is a parasite of S. balanoides, effectively castrating the barnacle if it is heavily infested. The lichens Arthropyrenia sublittoralis and Pyrenocollema halodytes may colonise the shells of barnacles.
