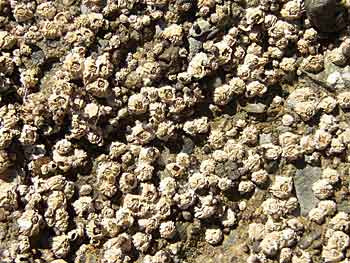
- Balanus glandula with Chthamalus fissus

Scientific classification
- Kingdom: Animalia
- Phylum: Arthropoda
- Clade: Pancrustacea
- Class: Thecostraca
- Subclass: Cirripedia
- Order: Balanomorpha
- Family: Balanidae
- Genus: Balanus
- Species: B. glandula

Binomial name
- Balanus glandula Darwin, 1854

= Balanus glandula =

Species of barnacle

Balanus glandula (commonly known as the North American acorn barnacle, Pacific acorn barnacle or common acorn barnacle) is one of the most common barnacle species on the Pacific coast of North America, distributed from the U.S. state of Alaska to Bahía de San Quintín near San Quintín, Baja California. They are commonly found in the upper intertidal zone on rocks, wood, and pier pilings. They can also be found growing on other organisms such as crustaceans, gastropods, bivalves, and other barnacles. This species is also highly adaptable to varying conditions, even being able to tolerate estuarine conditions of poor water circulation, low oxygen, and little wave action. They can obtain oxygen from both water and air. In its environment this species can be found mixed with other tidal organisms such as Chthamalus barnacles, mussles, and limpets. It is also one of the most abundant organisms in its environment, both in sedentary adults and planktonic larvae. Predators of this species includes dog whelks that can drill through the shell and sea stars that can pull apart the plates and evert their stomach through the openings. Other predators include dog winkles, specialized birds, and humans. Grazing limpets are also capable of pushing barnacles off of their attached substrate.

This acorn barnacle is a moderate-sized one with a diameter of up to 22 mm (0.9 in). The shell is formed by overlapping plates and has a calcareous basis. It has more the shape of a cylinder than the shape of a cone. The white operculum has heavily ridged walls. It can live up to ten years.

It has been intensely studied in recent years as a model species for linking physical oceanography and population genetics (or phylogeography) surveys. This species was introduced to the shores of Argentina in the 1960s, and has become an invasive species, displacing other barnacles and mussels.

Acorn barnacles begin as free-floating larvae. After drifting for a bit, the larvae settles on a surface and then "glues" itself down before metamorphosing into a juvenile and growing a hard shell.
