= Acorn barnacle =

Acorn barnacle and acorn shell are vernacular names for certain types of stalkless barnacles, generally excluding stalked or gooseneck barnacles. As adults they are typically cone-shaped, symmetrical, and attached to rocks or other fixed objects in the ocean. Members of the barnacle order Balanomorpha are often called acorn barnacles.

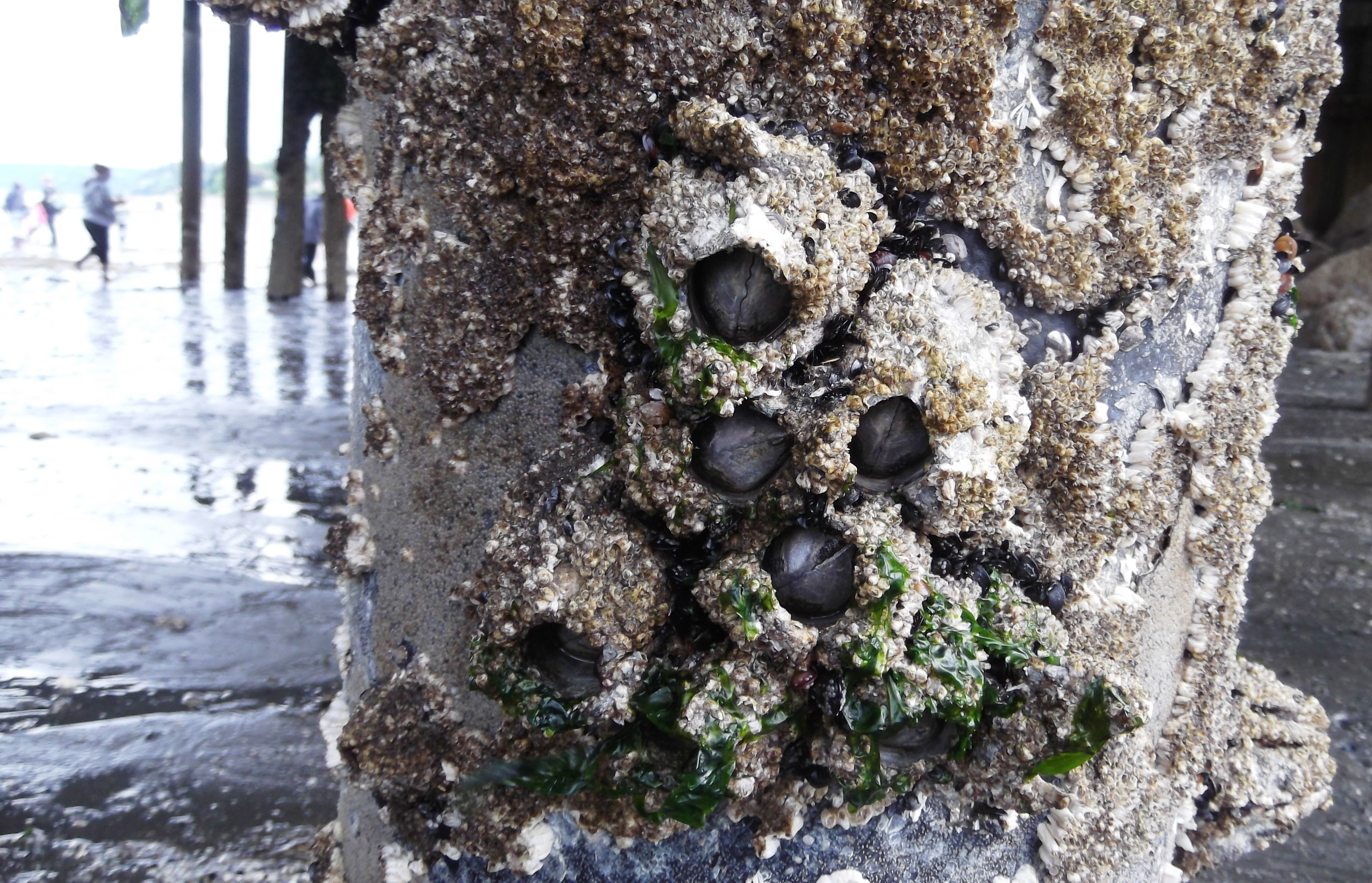
Acorn barnacles, Balanus glandula

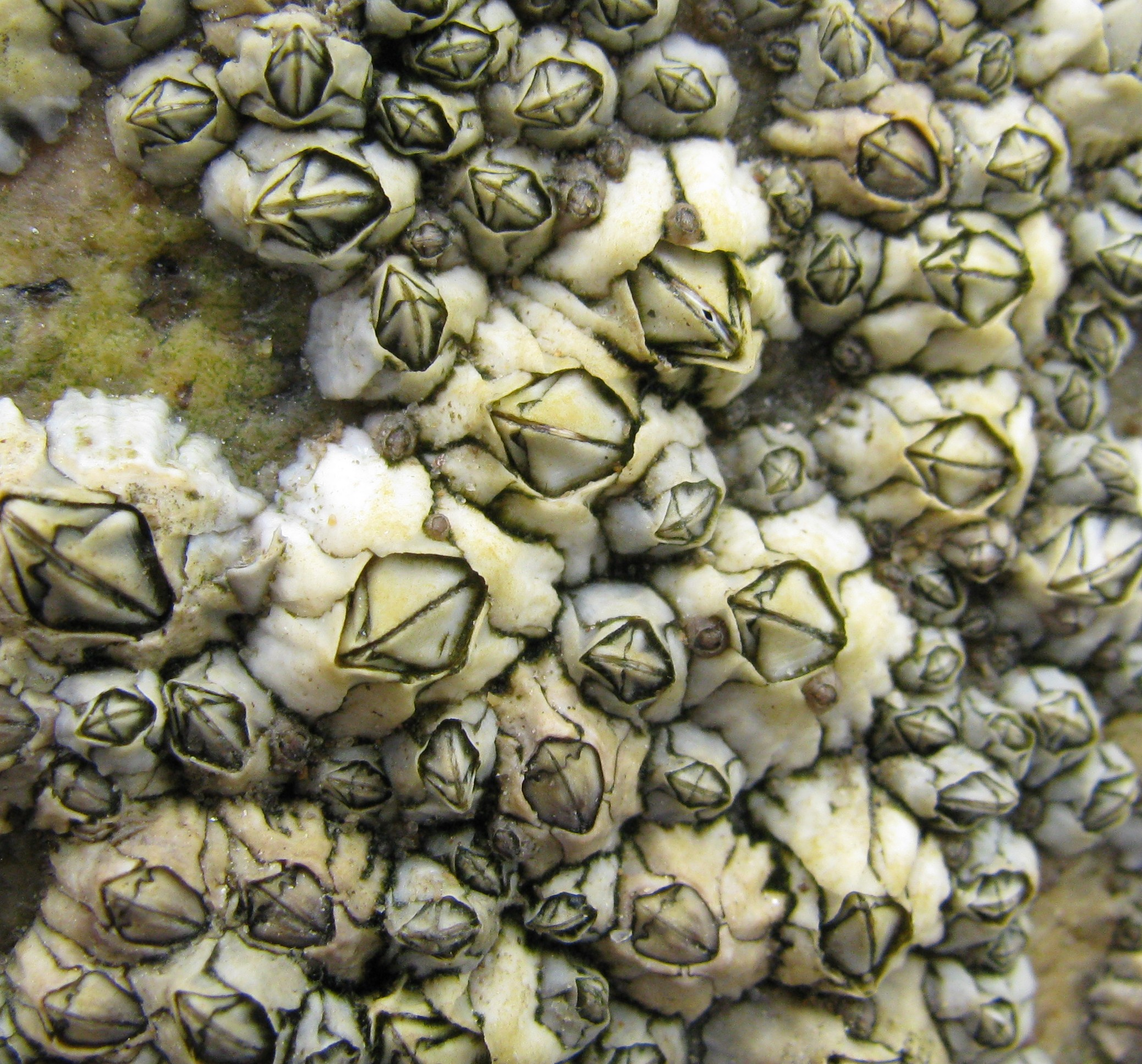
Acorn barnacles, Semibalanus balanoides

In addition, several species of barnacles are specifically called by the common name "acorn barnacle", including:

- Balanus glandula, common acorn barnacle
- Balanus nubilus, giant acorn barnacle
- Chthamalus antennatus, acorn barnacle
- Megabalanus coccopoma, titan acorn barnacle
- Megabalanus tintinnabulum, titan acorn barnacle
- Megabalanus rosa, acorn barnacle (Pilsbry, 1916)
- Paraconcavus pacificus, red-striped acorn barnacle
- Semibalanus balanoides, northern acorn barnacle
