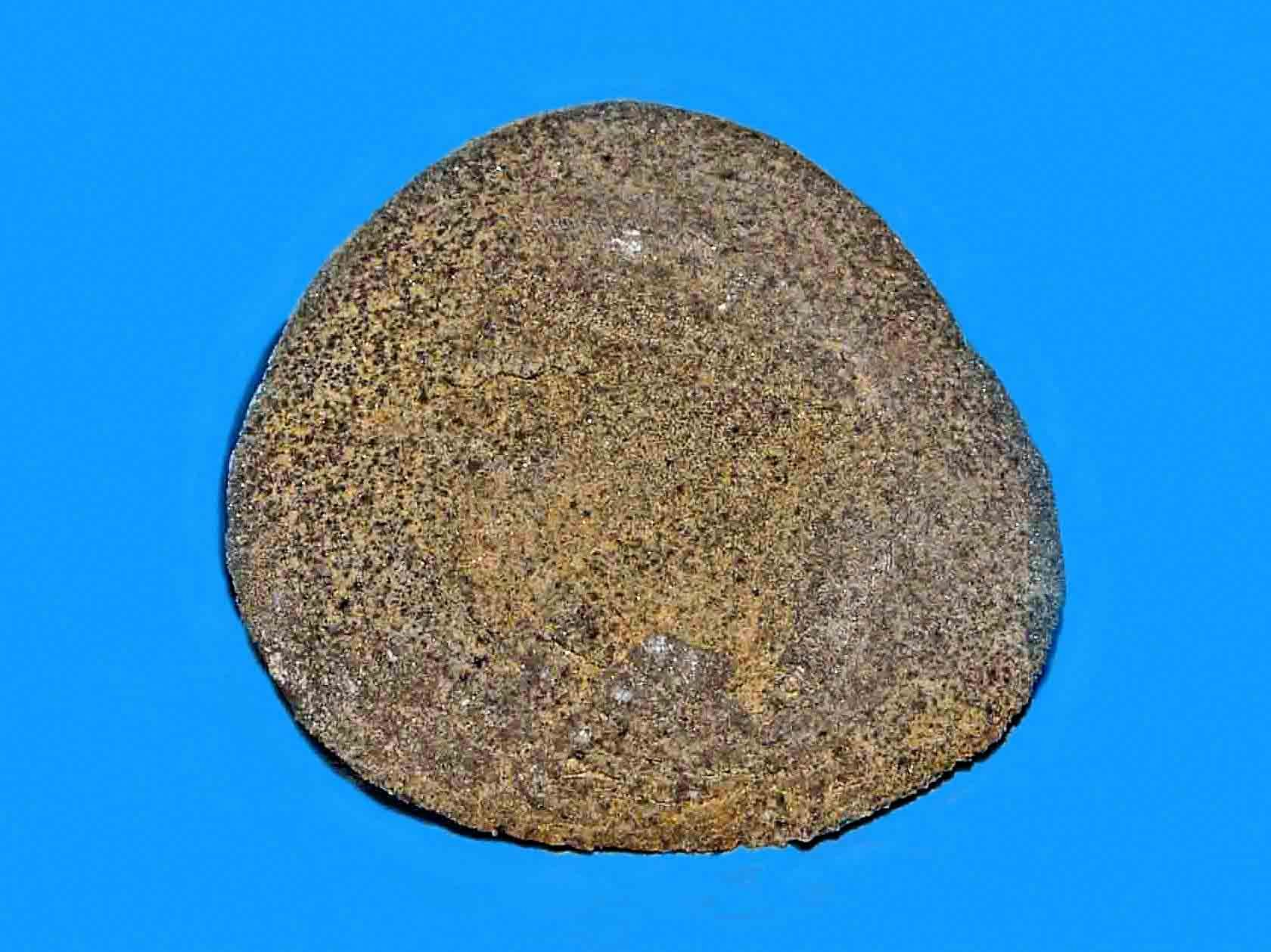
- Fossil of Dendraster ashleyi from San Diego Formation, California

Scientific classification
- Kingdom: Animalia
- Phylum: Echinodermata
- Class: Echinoidea
- Order: Echinolampadacea
- Family: Dendrasteridae
- Genus: Dendraster
- Species: †D. ashleyi

Binomial name
- †Dendraster ashleyi (Arnold, 1907)

= Dendraster ashleyi =

Extinct species of sea urchin

Dendraster ashleyi is an extinct species of echinoderm of the family Dendrasteridae. Fossil of this species have been found in the Pliocene of California (United States), about 5 Mya. They reach a diameter of about 3.5 cm.
