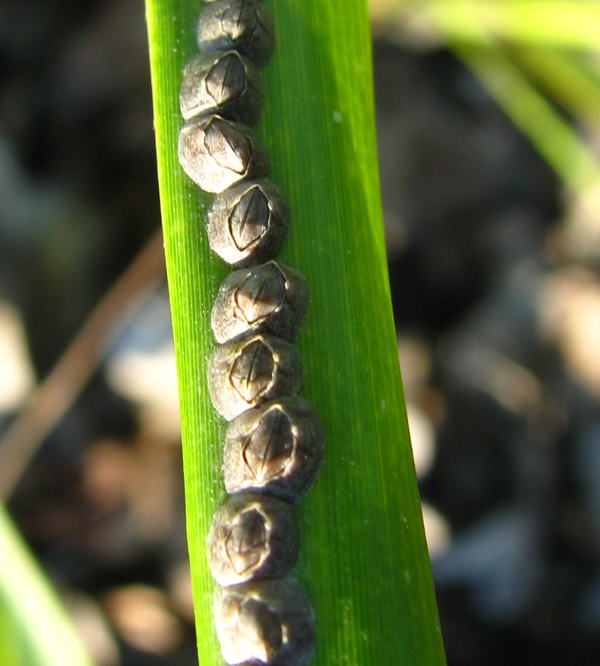
- Chthamalus fragilis on a leaf of Spartina alterniflora

Scientific classification
- Kingdom: Animalia
- Phylum: Arthropoda
- Clade: Pancrustacea
- Class: Thecostraca
- Subclass: Cirripedia
- Order: Balanomorpha
- Family: Chthamalidae
- Genus: Chthamalus; Foster, 1980
- Species: C. fragilis

Binomial name
- Chthamalus fragilis (Darwin, 1854)

= Chthamalus fragilis =

Species of crustacean

Chthamalus fragilis is a small gray barnacle found in the upper intertidal zone of the northwestern Atlantic Ocean, from approximately Cape Cod southward to Florida and into the Caribbean and Gulf of Mexico. It is also commonly known as little grey barnacle. The species is believed to have been distributed only as far northward as North Carolina or Virginia until the late 1800s, when it was noticed along the Massachusetts coast. The species may have expanded its range naturally or been introduced to New England through anthropogenic activities. Chthamalus fragilis is unusual in that it often recruits to stems of Spartina alterniflora.
