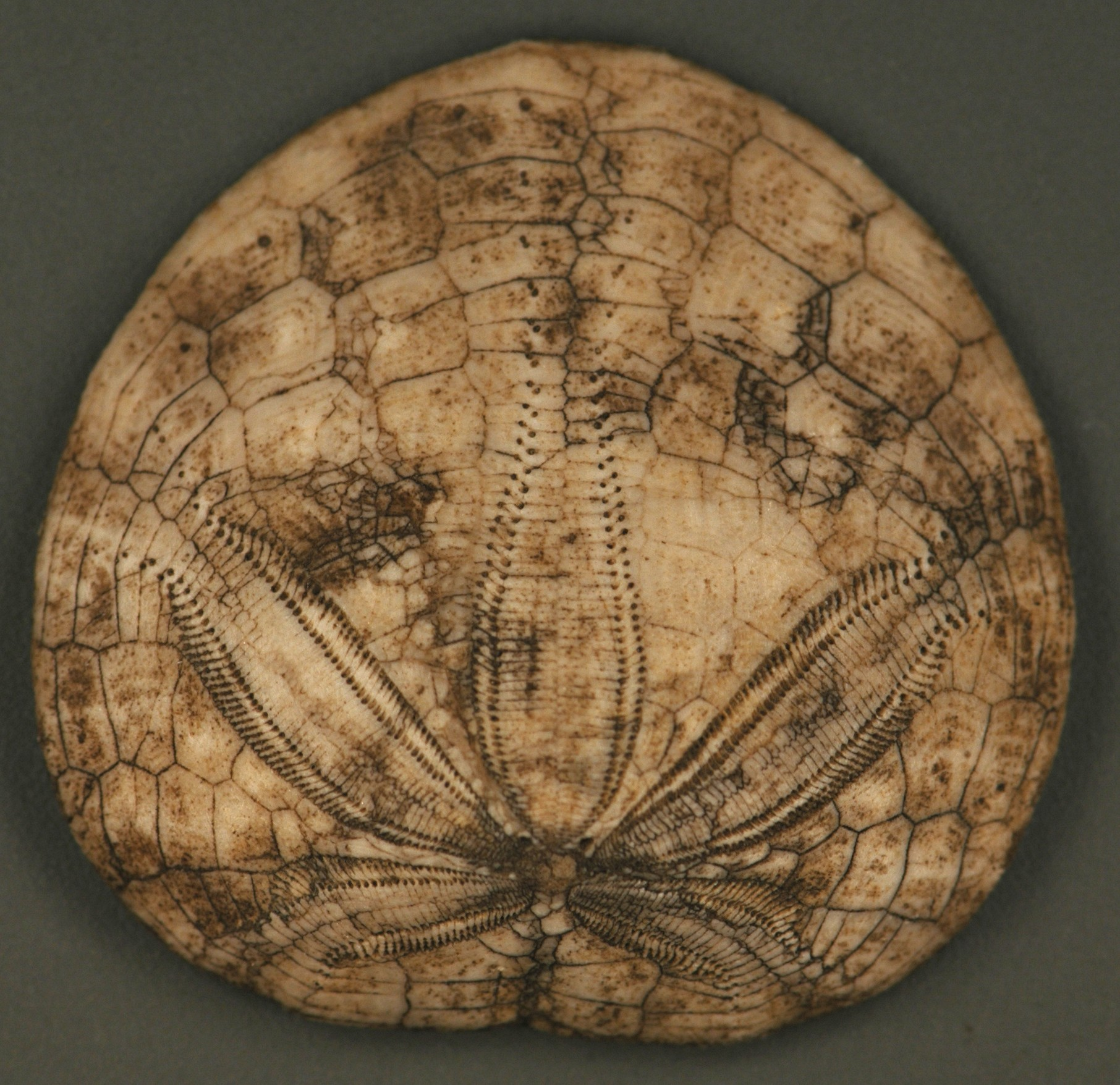
- Fossil of Dendraster gibbsii from Etchegoin Formation, California

Scientific classification
- Kingdom: Animalia
- Phylum: Echinodermata
- Class: Echinoidea
- Order: Echinolampadacea
- Family: Dendrasteridae
- Genus: Dendraster
- Species: †D. gibbsii

Binomial name
- †Dendraster gibbsii (Remond, 1863)

= Dendraster gibbsii =

Extinct species of sea urchin

Dendraster gibbsii is an extinct species of echinoderm of the family Dendrasteridae. Fossils of this species have been found in the Pliocene of California (United States). They reach a diameter of about 3.5 cm.
