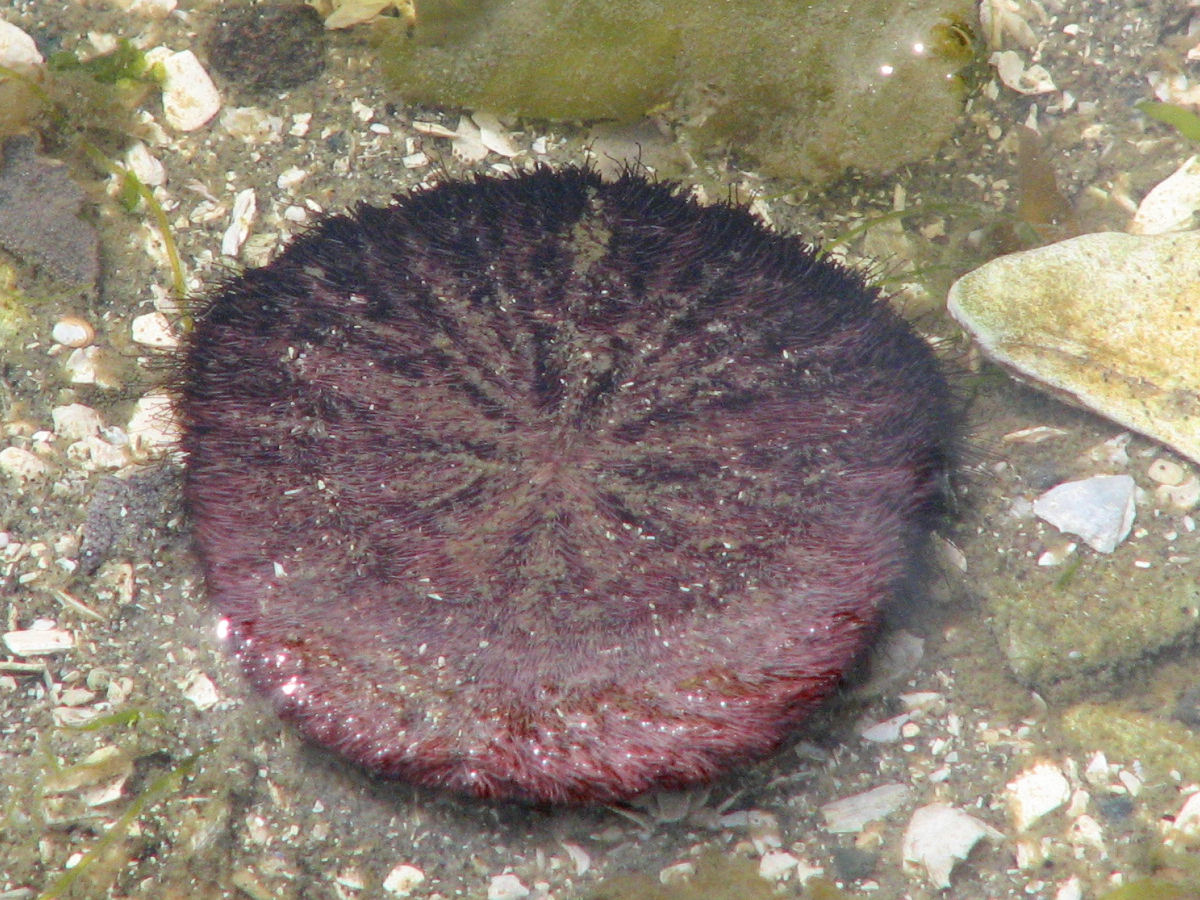
- Dendraster excentricus

Scientific classification
- Kingdom: Animalia
- Phylum: Echinodermata
- Class: Echinoidea
- Order: Echinolampadacea
- Family: Dendrasteridae; Lambert, 1900
- Genus: Dendraster; L. Agassiz, 1847

= Dendraster =

Genus of sea urchins

Dendraster is a genus of echinoderms, the only genus in the family Dendrasteridae. The extant species in this genus are found in the northeast Pacific Ocean from Alaska to Baja California. The best-known, most common and widespread species is D. excentricus.

== Species ==
Listed alphabetically.

- Dendraster ashleyi (Arnold) †
- Dendraster casseli Grant & Hertlein, 1938 †
- Dendraster elsmerensis Durham, 1949 †
- Dendraster excentricus (Eschscholtz, 1831)
- Dendraster gibbsii (Remond) †
- Dendraster laevis H. L. Clark, 1948
- Dendraster pacificus Kew, 1920 †
- Dendraster perrini (Weaver 1908) †
- Dendraster rugosus H. L. Clark
- Dendraster terminalis (Grant & Hertlein 1938)
- Dendraster vizcainoensis Grant and Hertlein, 1938
