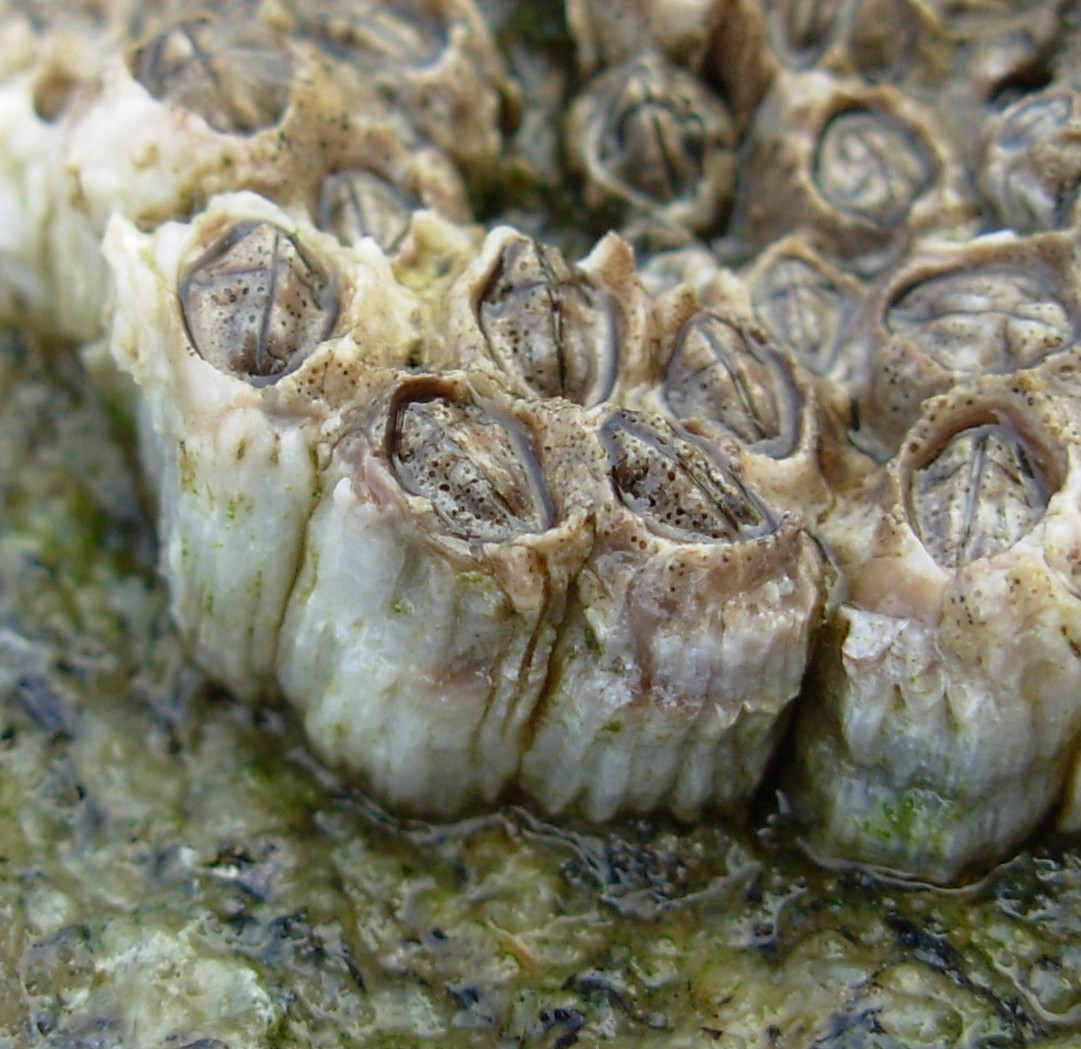

Scientific classification
- Kingdom: Animalia
- Phylum: Arthropoda
- Class: Thecostraca
- Subclass: Cirripedia
- Order: Balanomorpha
- Family: Chthamalidae
- Genus: Chthamalus
- Species: C. montagui

Binomial name
- Chthamalus montagui Southward, 1976

= Chthamalus montagui =

Species of barnacle

Chthamalus montagui, common name Montagu's stellate barnacle, is a species of acorn barnacle common on rocky shores in South West England, Ireland, and Southern Europe.

The vertical distribution of C. montagui overlaps with that of Chthamalus stellatus with the specific prevalence of one species over another in a given locale possibly related to differences in the distribution of the species' larval stages.
