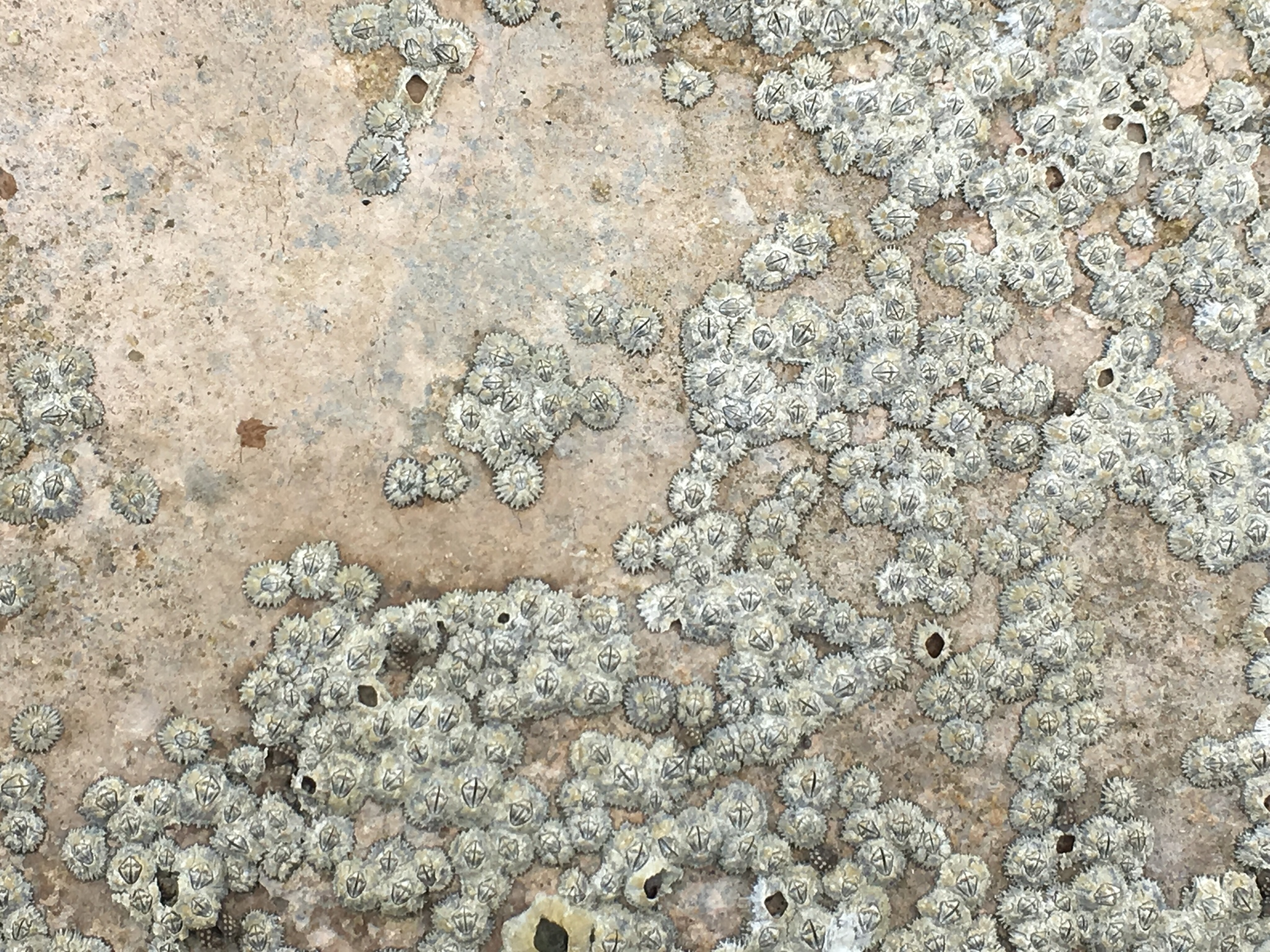
- Chthamalus malayensis, Malaysia

Scientific classification
- Kingdom: Animalia
- Phylum: Arthropoda
- Class: Thecostraca
- Subclass: Cirripedia
- Order: Balanomorpha
- Family: Chthamalidae
- Genus: Chthamalus
- Species: C. malayensis

Binomial name
- Chthamalus malayensis Pilsbry, 1916

= Chthamalus malayensis =

Species of barnacle

Chthamalus malayensis is a species of star barnacle in the family Chthamalidae.
