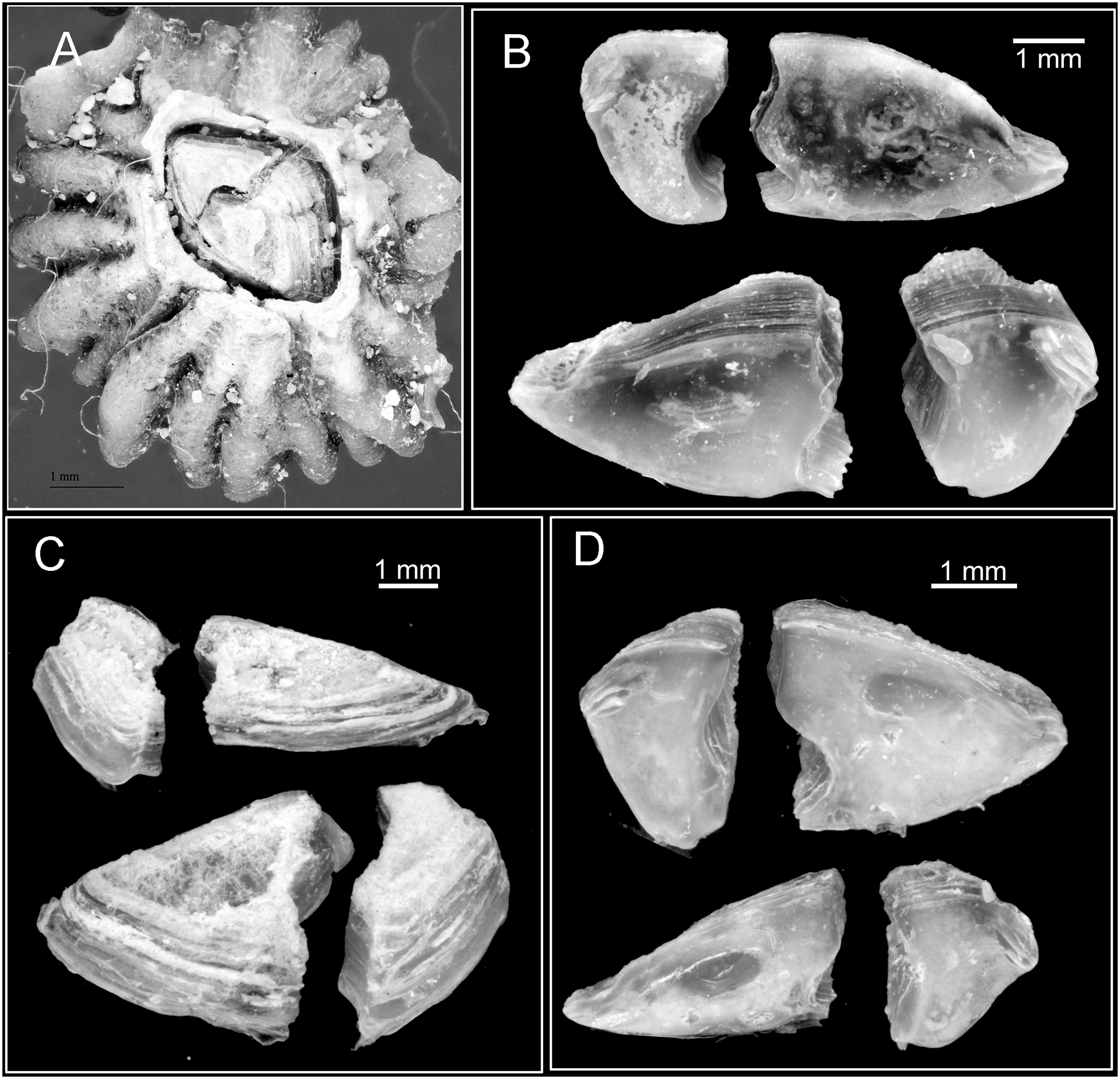

Scientific classification
- Kingdom: Animalia
- Phylum: Arthropoda
- Class: Thecostraca
- Subclass: Cirripedia
- Order: Balanomorpha
- Family: Chthamalidae
- Genus: Chthamalus
- Species: C. anisopoma

Binomial name
- Chthamalus anisopoma Pilsbry, 1916

= Chthamalus anisopoma =

Species of barnacle

Chthamalus anisopoma is a species of intertidal barnacle. Indigenous to the northern Gulf of California, adult Chthamalus anisopoma are found on exposed shores between 0.0 and 2.0 m above mean low tide. The species is typically absent in areas protected from wave splash. Notably, Chthamalus anisipoma exhibits predator-mediated plasticity in the growth of its calcareous test. In the presence of the carnivorous gastropod Acanthina angelica, the barnacle's typical conical growth form is altered to appear bent over, with the operculum perpendicular to the substrate. The alternate form is more resistant to predation.
