= Flamingolepis liguloides =

Scientific classification
- Kingdom: Animalia
- Phylum: Platyhelminthes
- Class: Cestoda
- Order: Cyclophyllidea
- Family: Hymenolepididae
- Genus: Flamingolepis
- Species: F. liguloides

Binomial name
- Flamingolepis liguloides (Gervais, 1847)

Species of tapeworm

Flamingolepis liguloides is a parasitic tapeworm of the Cestoda class. There are several tapeworms that are found to infect Artemia; however, F. liguloides is the most prevalent species of infectious tapeworm among Artemia. F. liguloides infects brine shrimp (Artemia) as the intermediate host and flamingos as the definitive host. Effects of the tapeworm in flamingos is unclear, though researchers hypothesize that a high parasitemia could potentially be deadly to the host. The parasite appears to affect the Artemia spp. as it alters the behavior and color of its host.

== Life cycle ==
Artemia can reproduce both sexually and asexually. The life cycle of F. liguloides begins by Artemia ingesting the cestode larva, called oncosphere. It then penetrates the intestinal wall into the hemocoel where it becomes a cysticercoid, or larva with a scolex. The larva reaches maturity in the digestive tract of the flamingo (definitive host). Adult parasites produce eggs, which are released in the feces and into the environment.

== Epidemiology ==
A survey conducted at four sites in southern Spain found the total prevalence of cestode ranging from 45 to 89% in Artemia with 45-77% being infected with Flamingolepis liguloides. High prevalence of F. liguloides can be observed throughout the year in southern Spain. However, this is not the case for all areas. In French saltpans the prevalence of F. liguloides in Artemia populations is much lower in the months of April to October, having a prevalence of around 4.25%. Artemia in saltpans outside the range of flamingos such as the Bulgarian Black Sea coast has a prevalence of almost zero.

Typically host density is indicative of parasitic presence. However, the survey acknowledged that environmental factors are also associated with parasitic presence. Specifically predicting that: temporal variation might structure the cestode community, the most common cestode species in brine shrimp would be those that used the most common bird species as final hosts and that temporal variation in Artemia would track changes in abundance of their final host. Seasonal patterns of infection of F. liguloides showed to have the highest prevalence in June and the lowest in December. Although the waterbird biomass was correlated to strong seasonal patterns, the actual transmission from birds or the removal of infected shrimp showed no significant effect. There was also no clear relationship between cestode and final host abundances. The gender of A. salina did not significantly hinder infection rates of F. liguloides. Showing that seasonal patterns seem to play a big factor in F. liguloides prevalence, whereas other environmental factors may not play as big a role.

== Anatomy and morphology ==
Anatomy of Flamingolepis ligulepis begins with an oval cyst formation. Within this structure, the organism's myriad of calcium corpuscles provide the parasite with a rigid enclosed space for occupation within the host environment such as occupation within erythrocytes. The typical scolex of F. liguloides is nearly 3x that of its close relative, Flamingolepis flamingo, allowing for more room to hold suckers and hooks. A feature often used to distinguish F. ligulepis is the presence of 8 skrjabinnoid hooks. Each of these hooks are characteristically 180-190 μm in length. When visualizing the body plan of the parasite, the hooks and blades are localized on the posterior end. The rostellar suckers of F. liguloides are oval shaped, with small hooks surrounding the perimeter. The rostellar hooks act as blades that aid in parasitic attachment.

== Behavioral manipulation ==
In infected shrimp, the larva changes the color from transparent to red, making them more susceptible to avian predators. Parasitic castration is also observed in Artemia

In a study conducted by Rode and Lievens, two species of Artemia that are found to congregate in swarms have coinfections of two microsporidian fungi and the F. liguloides tapeworm. Observing this unusual behavior, they hypothesize that the shrimps are being manipulated by the parasite which makes them easier to spot by flamingos, which are the parasite's definitive host. Each shrimp is one centimeter in length, but when gathered, the swarms can stretch up to two meters. Using the Artemia's characteristic of high salinity tolerance, the swarms are formed in water that is too salty to be habitable for fish. Rode and Lievens also hypothesize that the parasitic infection increases the shrimps' lifespan, time spent at the water surface, and that the castration is to prevent the shrimps from spending time with sexual reproduction. These behaviors would contribute to increasing the chance for the infected Artemia to be consumed by flamingos.
