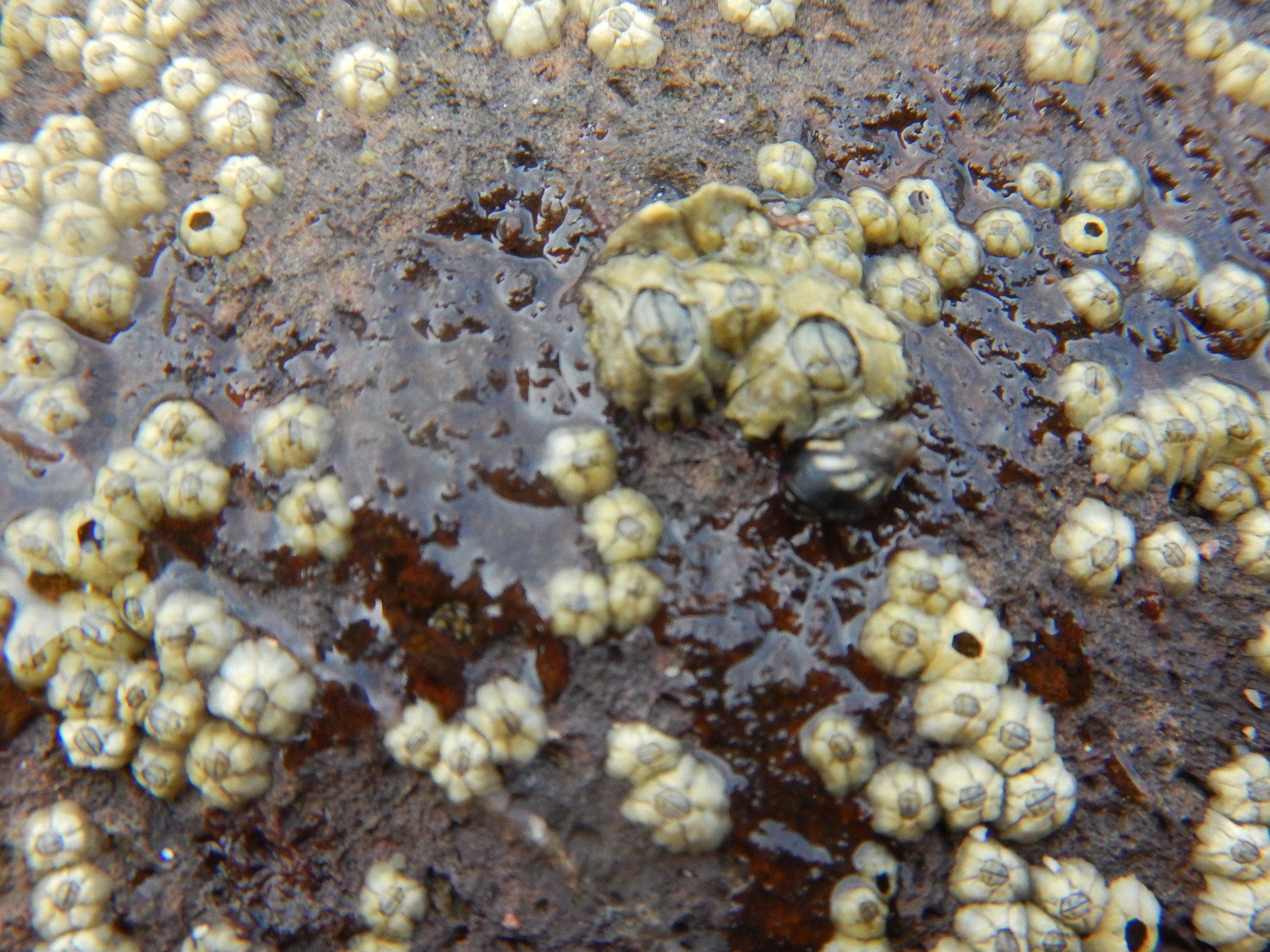
- Chthamalus hedgecocki, Mexico

Scientific classification
- Kingdom: Animalia
- Phylum: Arthropoda
- Class: Thecostraca
- Subclass: Cirripedia
- Order: Balanomorpha
- Family: Chthamalidae
- Genus: Chthamalus
- Species: C. hedgecocki

Binomial name
- Chthamalus hedgecocki Pitombo & Burton, 2007

= Chthamalus hedgecocki =

Species of barnacle

Chthamalus hedgecocki is a species of star barnacle in the family Chthamalidae.
