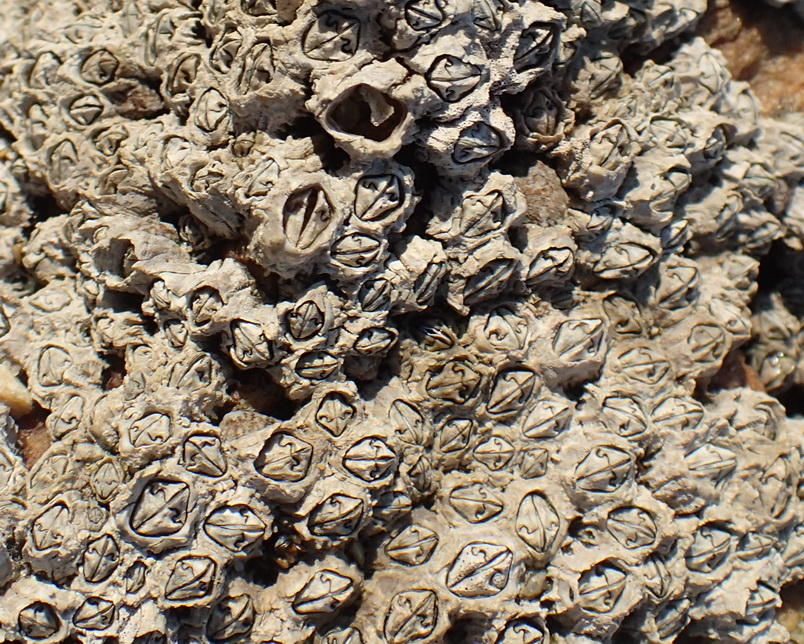
- Chthamalus dentatus, South Africa

Scientific classification
- Kingdom: Animalia
- Phylum: Arthropoda
- Class: Thecostraca
- Subclass: Cirripedia
- Order: Balanomorpha
- Family: Chthamalidae
- Genus: Chthamalus
- Species: C. dentatus

Binomial name
- Chthamalus dentatus Krauss, 1848

= Chthamalus dentatus =

Species of barnacle

Chthamalus dentatus, the tooth barnacle, is a species of star barnacle in the family Chthamalidae. Across the entire distribution of C. dentatus, from northwestern Africa around to Madagascar, there are likely at least three genomically distinct species
