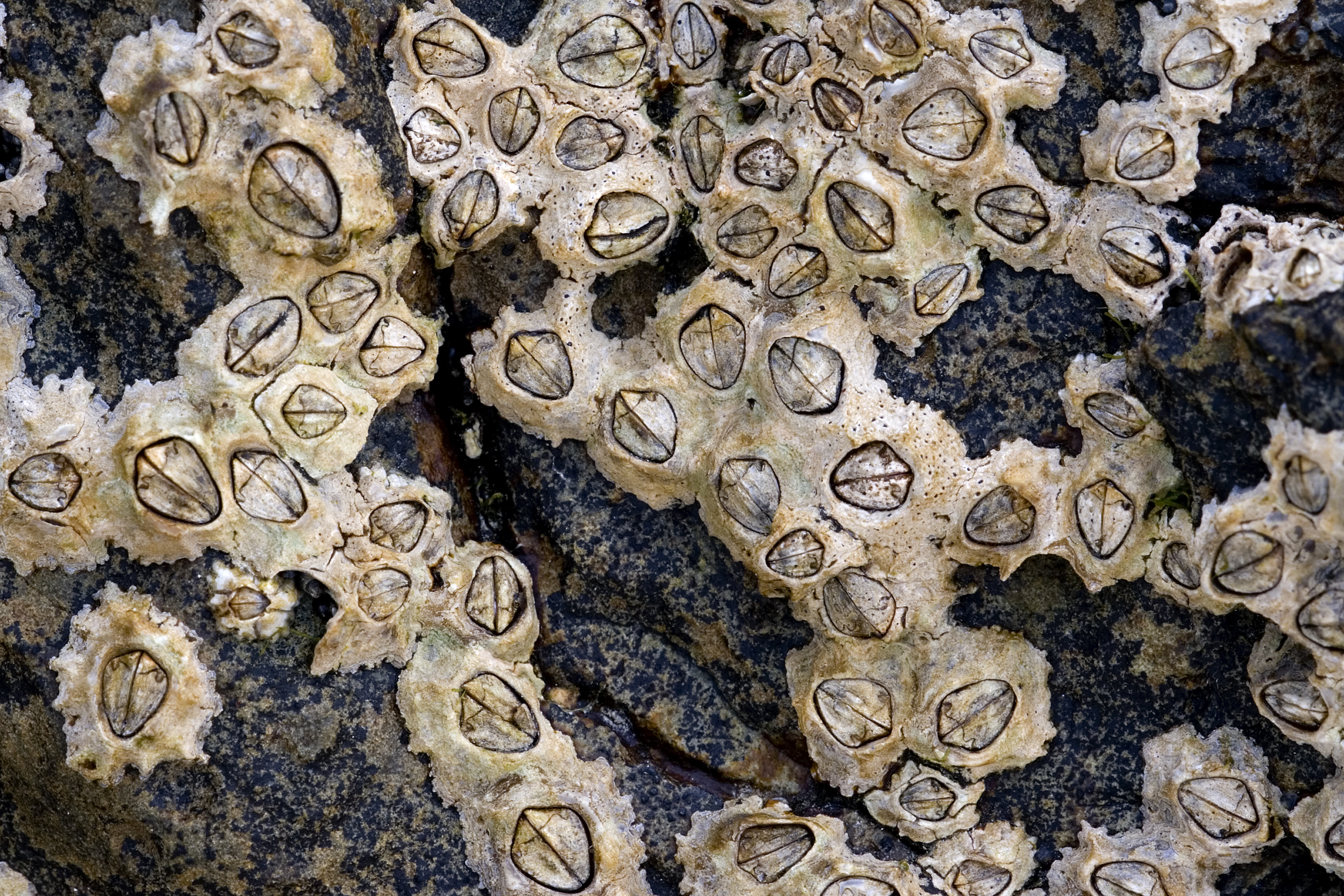
- A colony of Chthamalus stellatus

Scientific classification
- Kingdom: Animalia
- Phylum: Arthropoda
- Clade: Pancrustacea
- Class: Thecostraca
- Subclass: Cirripedia
- Order: Balanomorpha
- Family: Chthamalidae
- Genus: Chthamalus; Ranzani, 1817

= Chthamalus =

Genus of barnacles

Chthamalus (χθαμαλός, "flat" or "on the ground") is a genus of barnacles that is found along almost all non-boreal coasts of the Northern Hemisphere, as well as many regions in the Southern Hemisphere. These small barnacles have been studied in part because of the taxonomic confusion over a group of species that, by and large, are morphologically and ecologically quite similar. In recent years, molecular techniques have identified a number of cryptic species that have been subsequently confirmed by taxonomists using morphological measurements. Most recently the genus has been shown to be paraphyletic, with the genus Microeuraphia nested within Chthamalus.

== Field identification ==
Identification of barnacles in the field can be challenging, and identification of particular species of Chthamalus is not considered reliable in the field other than a few species. However, a notable distinction in the arrangement of wall plates can help biologists distinguish Chthamalid barnacles from the other common barnacles in the family Balanidae. In chthamalid barnacles, the side plates overlap both the rostrum and the carina (the plates at the ends of the opercular opening), while in balanids one end plate (the rostrum) overlaps the adjoining side plates (rostrolaterals).

== Species ==
The following species are included in the genus Chthamalus:

- Chthamalus angustitergum Pilsbry, 1916
- Chthamalus anisopoma Pilsbry, 1916
- Chthamalus antennatus Darwin, 1854
- Chthamalus barnesi Achituv & Safriel, 1980
- Chthamalus bisinuatus (Pilsbry, 1916)
- Chthamalus challengeri Hoek, 1883
- Chthamalus dalli Pilsbry, 1916 (little brown barnacle)
- Chthamalus dentatus Krauss, 1848 (tooth barnacle)
- Chthamalus fissus Darwin, 1854
- Chthamalus fragilis Darwin, 1854 (fragile barnacle)
- Chthamalus hedgecocki Pitombo & Burton, 2007
- Chthamalus malayensis Pilsbry, 1916
- Chthamalus montagui Southward, 1976 (montagu's stellate barnacle)
- Chthamalus moro Pilsbry, 1916
- Chthamalus newmani Chan, 2016
- Chthamalus panamensis Pilsbry, 1916
- Chthamalus proteus Dando & Southward, 1980 (Atlantic barnacle)
- Chthamalus sinensis Ren, 1984
- Chthamalus southwardi Poltarukha, 2000
- Chthamalus southwardorum Pitombo & Burton, 2007
- Chthamalus stellatus (Poli, 1791) (poli's stellate barnacle)
- Chthamalus williamsi Chan & Cheang, 2015
- † Chthamalus graziani Carriol, 2008
- † Chthamalus ligusticus de Alessandri, 1895
- † Chthamalus nasus Carriol, 2008
- † Chthamalus robustus Carriol, 2008
