= Parasitic castration =

One strategy of parasitism

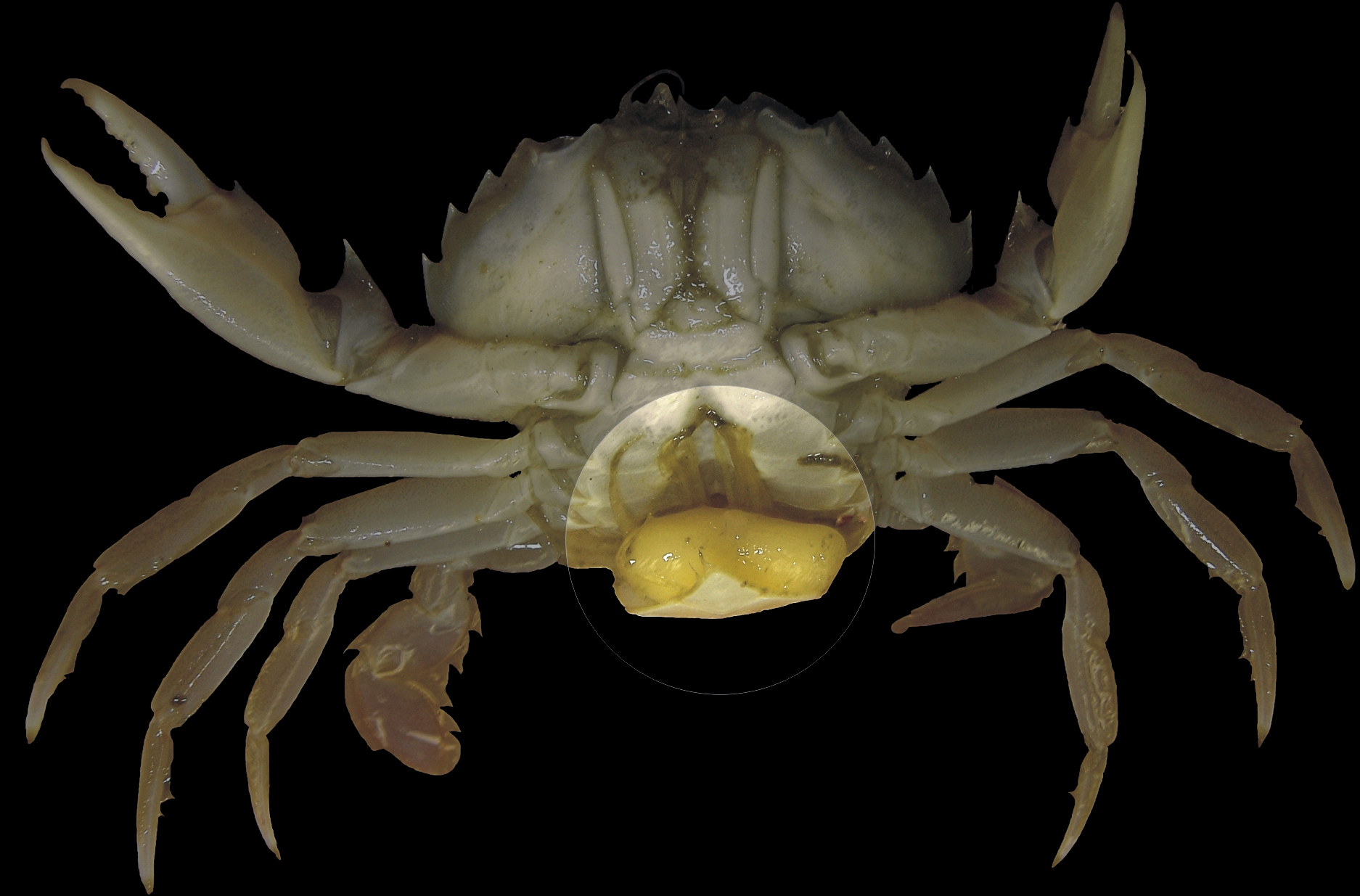
Crab with egg sac of the parasitic barnacle Sacculina carcini. The parasite stops reproduction in its host, the crab, and stimulates the female crab to disperse parasite eggs with the same behavior that she would normally use for her own eggs.

Parasitic castration is the strategy, by a parasite, of blocking reproduction by its host, completely or in part, to its own benefit. This is one of six major strategies within parasitism.

== Evolutionary strategy ==
The parasitic castration strategy, which results in the reproductive death of the host, can be compared with the parasitoid strategy, which results in the host's death. Both parasitoids and parasitic castrators tend to be similar to their host in size, whereas most non-castrating parasites are orders of magnitude smaller than the host. In both strategies, an infected host is much less hospitable to new parasites than an uninfected one.

A parasite that ends the reproductive life of its host theoretically liberates a significant fraction of the host's resources, which can now be used to benefit the parasite. The fraction of intact host energy spent on reproduction includes not just gonads and gametes but also secondary sexual characteristics, mate-seeking behavior, competition, and care for offspring. Infected hosts may have a different appearance, lacking said sex characteristics and sometimes even devoting more energy to growth, resulting in gigantism. The evolutionary parasitologist Robert Poulin suggests that parasitic castration may result in prolonged host life, benefiting the parasite.

Parasitic castration may be direct, as in Hemioniscus balani, a parasite of hermaphroditic barnacles which feeds on ovarian fluid, so that its host loses female reproductive ability but still can function as a male. Parasitic castration may equally be indirect, as when a parasite diverts host energy from developing gonads or secretes castrating hormones.

The parasitic castration strategy is used by some larval trematode parasites of snails and some isopod and barnacle parasites of crustaceans. For example, 18 species of trematodes parasitically castrate the California horn snail, Cerithidea californica.

Certain other effects of a parasite on its host may appear similar to parasitic castration, such as the host's immune system diverting energy from reproduction in response to numerous parasites that singly would have no impact on fecundity or fertility, or parasitoids that may consume reproductive organs first.

Mechanisms

Parasitic castration occurs via physiological and/or developmental mechanisms that destroy or impair the reproduction capabilities of the host organisms. Many parasites, such as Cercaria batillariae, completely destroy the gonads of their host. Other parasites may interfere with the normal development of gonads/reproductive organs.

There are also indirect mechanisms, which divert the energy usually dedicated to reproduction, to the parasite's growth and reproduction. The redirection of nutrients will hinder the hosts reproduction, even if their gonads are still intact. Parasites may also alter hormones, in turn affecting reproductive health/function. There may also be a combination of both gonad replacement and redirection.

== Taxonomic range ==
Parasite group	Parasite species	Host group	Host species	Remarks
Protista Sporozoa	Mackinnonia tubificis	Annelida Oligochaete	Tubifex tubifex	Destroys gonad
Protista Haplosporidia	Urosporidium charletti	Cestoda	Catenotaenia dendritica	"Hypercastrator" (a hyperparasite that castrates the parasite it parasitizes)
Platyhelminthes Trematoda	Bucephalus mytili	Mollusca Bivalvia or Gastropoda	various species	Destroys gonad, host grows larger
Platyhelminthes Cestoda	various species	Pisces Cyprinidae	various species	Destroys gonad, behavioral changes
Arthropoda Isopoda	Hemioniscus balani	Arthropoda Cirripedia	various barnacles	Drains ovarian fluid of hermaphrodite, but spares male function
Arthropoda Cirripedia	Sacculina	Arthropoda Decapoda	various crabs	Atrophies gonads, behavioral changes, partially feminizes males and stops regeneration of crab legs
Arthropoda Strepsiptera	twisted-wing flies	Arthropoda Hymenoptera or Hemiptera	various species	Males feminized, females produce no eggs but instead disperse eggs of parasite
Platyhelminthes Cestoda	Flamingolepis liguloides	Arthropoda	Artemia spp.	Destroys gonads, behavioral changes
Arthropoda Hymenoptera	Crematogaster sjostedti	Plant	Acacia drepanolobium	Ant removes axillary meristems, sterilizing trees.
