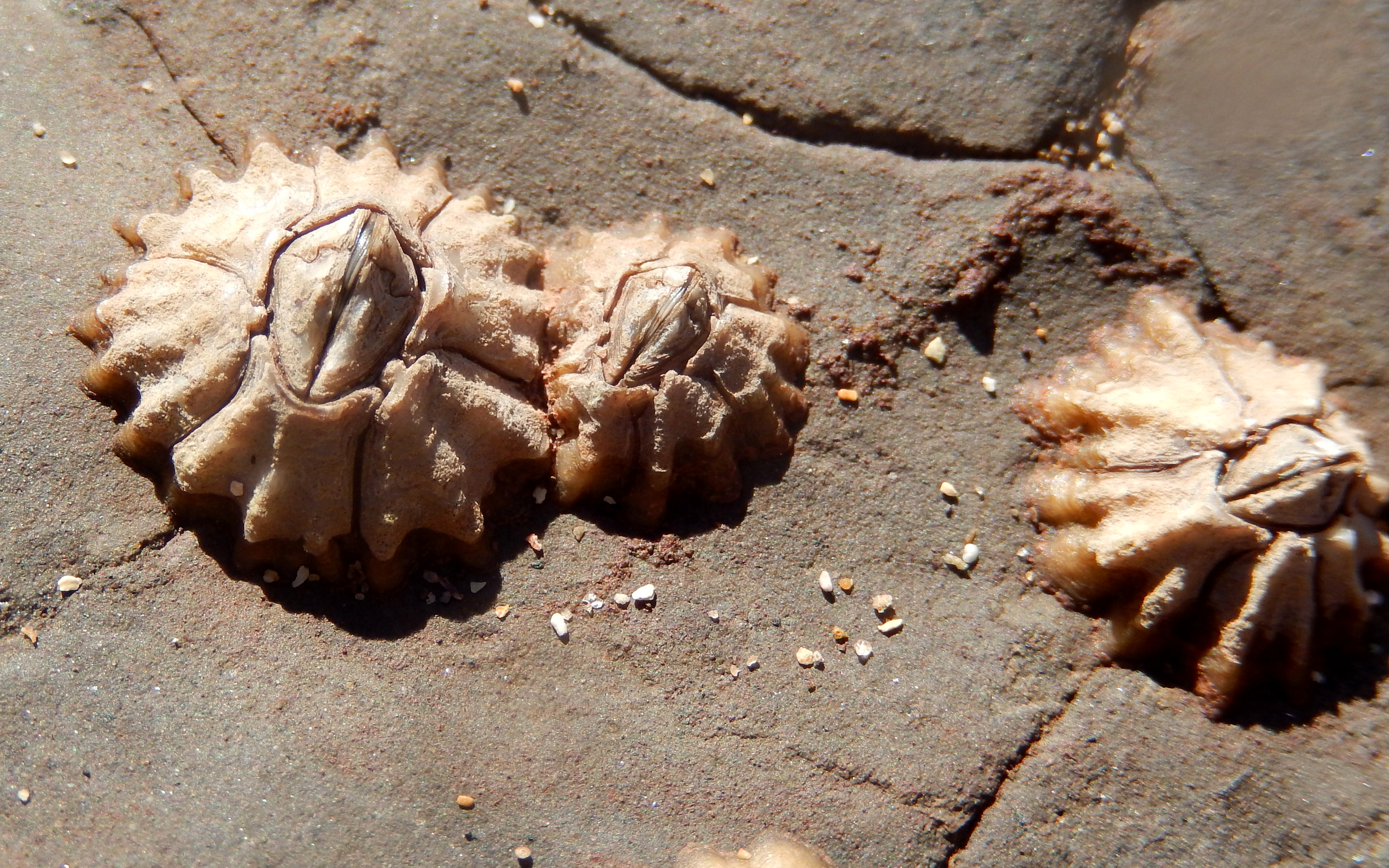
- Long Reef, Australia

Scientific classification
- Kingdom: Animalia
- Phylum: Arthropoda
- Class: Thecostraca
- Subclass: Cirripedia
- Order: Balanomorpha
- Family: Chthamalidae
- Genus: Chthamalus
- Species: C. antennatus

Binomial name
- Chthamalus antennatus Darwin, 1854

= Chthamalus antennatus =

Species of barnacle

Chthamalus antennatus, the six-plated barnacle is a species of intertidal barnacle found in eastern and southern Australia. Growing from two centimetres wide and one centimetre high. The barnacle is found on the coast, usually on rocks at or above the high tide level or just below the splash zone. Feeding occurs only at unusually high tides.
