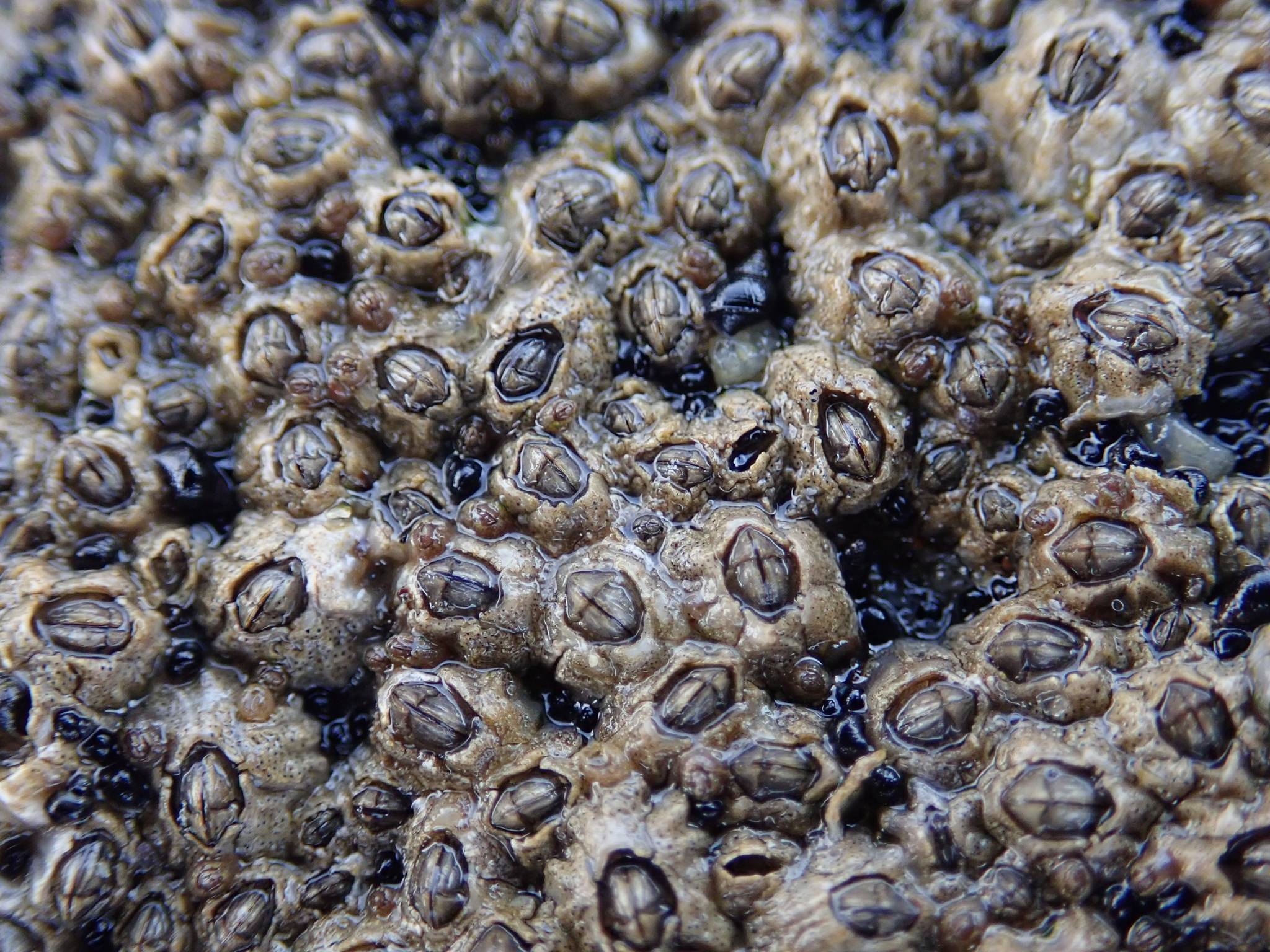

Scientific classification
- Kingdom: Animalia
- Phylum: Arthropoda
- Class: Thecostraca
- Subclass: Cirripedia
- Order: Balanomorpha
- Family: Chthamalidae
- Genus: Chthamalus
- Species: C. dalli

Binomial name
- Chthamalus dalli Pilsbry, 1916

= Chthamalus dalli =

Little brown barnacle

Species of barnacle

Chthamalus dalli, commonly known as the little brown barnacle, is a species of barnacle in the family Chthamalidae. It can be found in intertidal zones along the North American Pacific coast from Alaska to San Diego.
