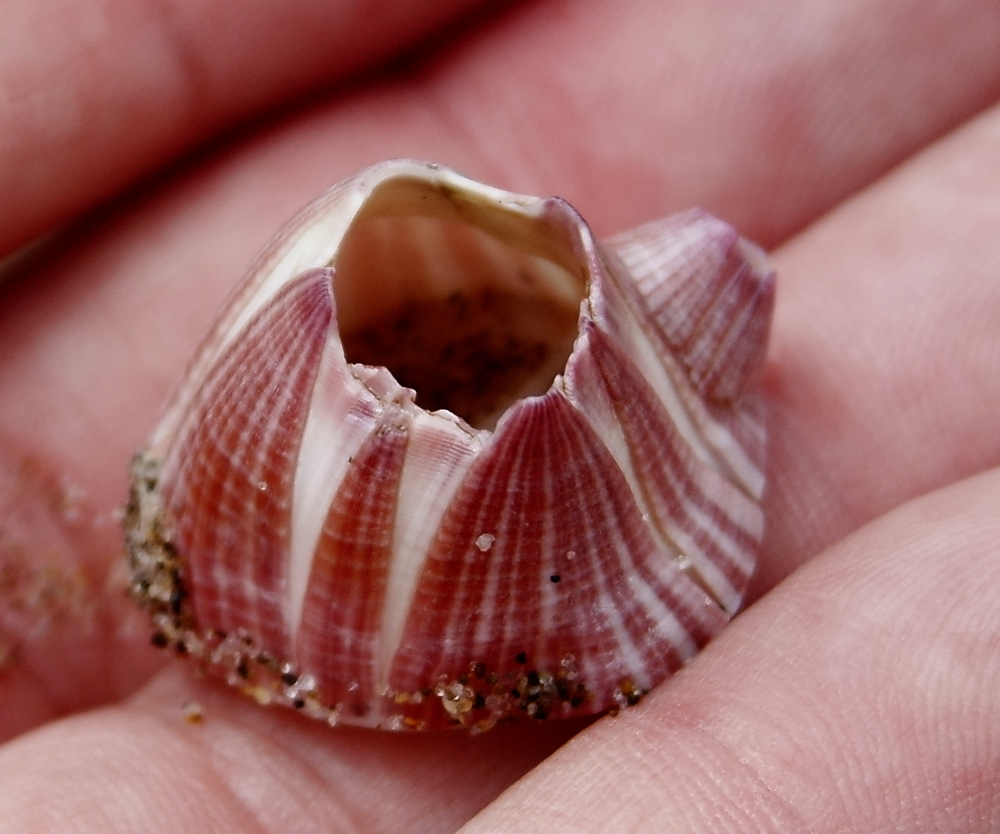
- Paraconcavus pacificus, red-striped acorn barnacle, California

Scientific classification
- Kingdom: Animalia
- Phylum: Arthropoda
- Class: Thecostraca
- Subclass: Cirripedia
- Order: Balanomorpha
- Family: Balanidae
- Genus: Paraconcavus
- Species: P. pacificus

Binomial name
- Paraconcavus pacificus (Pilsbry, 1916)

= Paraconcavus pacificus =

Red-striped acorn barnacle

Species of barnacle

Paraconcavus pacificus, the red-striped acorn barnacle, is a species of balanid barnacle known from subtidal sandy habitats of the outer northeastern Pacific coast, from Baja California north to Monterey Bay. It grows to 35 mm in diameter, with pink longitudinal stripes over white plates, and can be distinguished from other large, pink-striped barnacles in its range (e.g. Amphibalanus amphitrite) by the longitudinal striations across the growth rings of its plates. While it will attach to many different kinds of hard substrate, it shows a preference for attaching to the shells of other organisms, particularly sand dollars.
