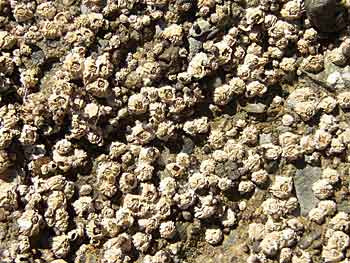
- Chthamalus fissus

Scientific classification
- Kingdom: Animalia
- Phylum: Arthropoda
- Class: Thecostraca
- Subclass: Cirripedia
- Order: Balanomorpha
- Family: Chthamalidae
- Genus: Chthamalus
- Species: C. fissus

Binomial name
- Chthamalus fissus Darwin, 1854

= Chthamalus fissus =

Species of barnacle

Chthamalus fissus is a species of star barnacle in the family Chthamalidae.
