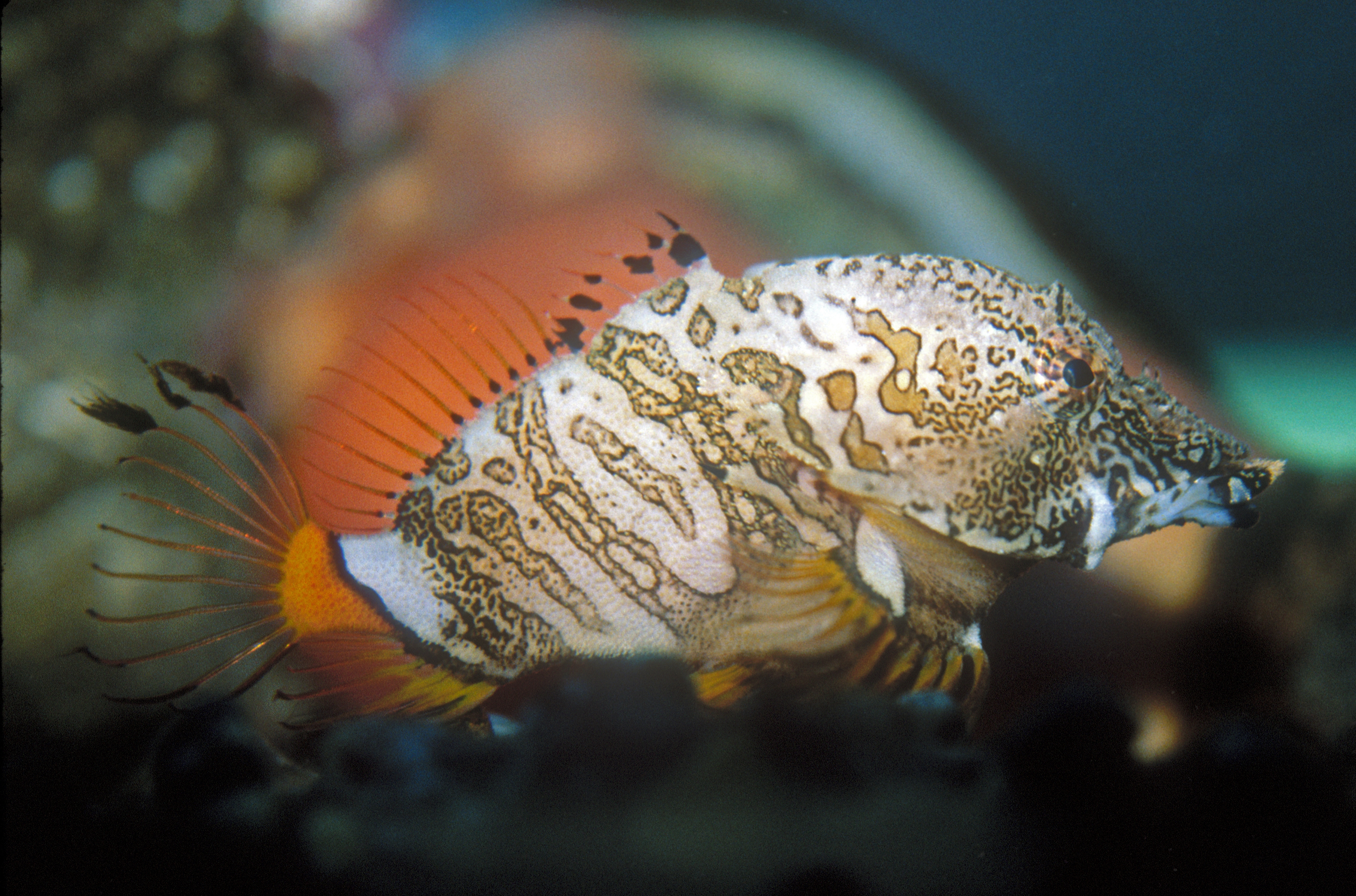
- Grunt sculpin (Rhamphocottus richardsonii)

Scientific classification
- Kingdom: Animalia
- Phylum: Chordata
- Class: Actinopterygii
- Order: Perciformes
- Suborder: Cottoidei
- Family: Rhamphocottidae
- Genus: Rhamphocottus; Günther, 1874

Type species
- Rhamphocottus richardsonii Günther, 1874

= Rhamphocottus =

Genus of fish

Rhamphocottus is a genus of marine ray-finned fishes belonging to the family Rhamphocottidae. These fishes are known as grunt sculpins. The grunt sculpins are found in the North Pacific Ocean.

== Taxonomy ==
Rhamphocottus was first proposed as a monospecific genus by the German born British herpetologist and ichthyologist Albert Günther in 1874 when he described R. richardsonii from Fort Rupert in British Columbia. This genus was regarded as the only genus in the monogeneric family Rhamphocottidae but in 2014 the family Ereunidae was synonymised with the Rhamphocottidae and the genera Ereunias and Marukawichthys were added to the family. A second species of the genus, R. nagaakii was descrinbed in 2022.

== Etymology ==
Rhamphocottus is a combination of rhamphos, meaning "beak", and cottus, the type genus of the Cottoidea, an allusion to the elongated snout of these fishes.

== Species ==
Rhamphocottus contains two species:

- Rhamphocottus nagaakii Munehara, Yamazaki & Tsuruoka, 2022
- Rhamphocottus richardsonii Günther, 1874

== Characteristics ==
Rhamphocottus grunt sculpins have a large head which can be equivalent to as much as 60% of their standard length with an elongated snout and bony ridges on either side of the head, an alternative name suggested for them was horsehead sculpins. They have a deep body with the dorsal profile being high and the body is moderately compressed. Therer are small plates with multiple spines on the head and body, the spines sticking through the skin to create a prickly defence. There is a single robust and sharp spine on the preoperculum. All of the finrays are simple. There are two separate dorsal fins, the first dorsal fin is supported by between 7 and 9 spines while the second contains 12 to 14 soft rays. The anal fin has 6 to 8 softrays, and is situated opposite the rear fin rays of the second dorsal fin. The pelvic fins have a single spine and 3 or 4 soft rays. The lower pectoral fin rays are elongated, robust, and free of the fin membrane, these are used in crawling along the substrate. There is a lateral line but this is only extends to the rear third of the second dorsal fin, and comprises roughly 25 pores set in short, raised tubes. There are no teeth on the palatine. There is a broad fusion of the gill membranes with the isthmus and the gill slits are small and set over the base of the pectoral fins. There is no swim bladder. The maximum published total length for this genus is 8.9 cm (3.5 in).

== Distribution and habitat ==
Rhamphocottus grunt sculpins are found in the North Pacific Ocean where they are found from the intertidal zone down to 165 m (541 ft), being found tidal pools and rocky areas, as well as areas with sand substrates. R. richardsonii is found in the northeastern Pacific Ocean between Alaska and California while R. nagaakii is found off Japan., the two species seem to have been separated in a cool period of the Miocene or Pliocene and have some morphological and genetic differences.

== Biology ==
Rhamphocottus grunt sculpins are often seen sheltering in empty shells, including those of the giant barnacle (Balanus nubilis) as well as discarded bottles and cans. They feed on small crustaceans, fish larvae and zooplankton. During spawning the females chase the males into rock crevices, keeping him in the crevice until she lays an egg mass.
