= Rhamphocottus nagaakii =

Scientific classification
- Kingdom: Animalia
- Phylum: Chordata
- Class: Actinopterygii
- Division: Teleostei
- Order: Perciformes
- Suborder: Cottoidei
- Family: Rhamphocottidae
- Genus: Rhamphocottus
- Species: R. nagaakii

Binomial name
- Rhamphocottus nagaakii Munehara, Yamazaki & Tsuruoka, 2022

Species of fish

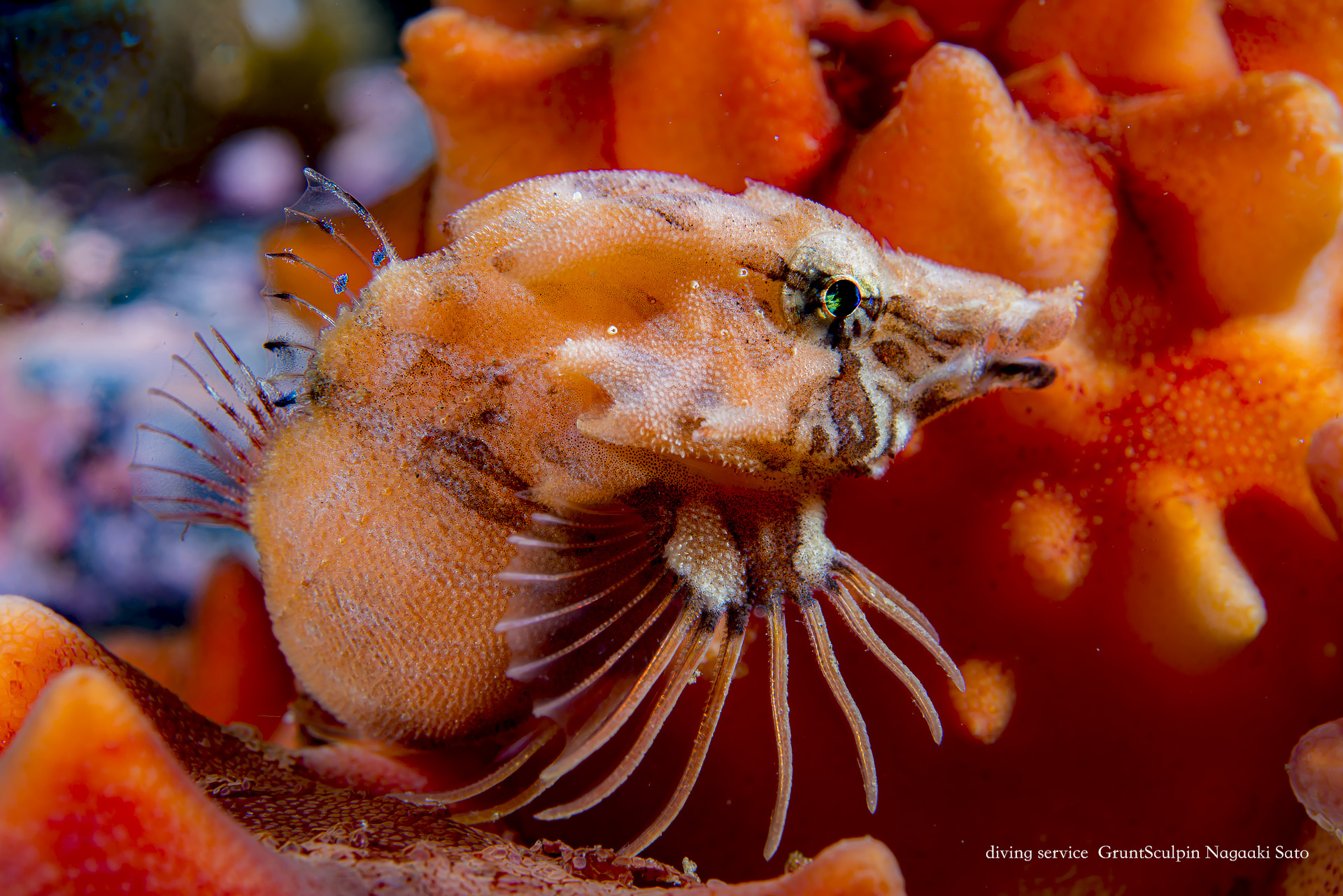
Adult Grunt Sculpin

Rhamphocottus nagaakii is a species of marine ray-finned fish belonging to the family Rhamphocottidae, the grunt sculpins. This species was first formally described in 2022 with its type locality given as off Minami-Sanriku cho in Miyagi Prefecture of Japan. It is thought to have evolved from a common ancestor to the grunt sculpin (Rhamphocottus richardsonii) but the two species were thought to have been separated by a cooling event during either the Pliocene or Miocene. This species differs from the grunt sculpin genetically and morphologically. The specific name honours Nagaaki Satoh, a professional diving instructor, who was the first to observe the reproductive behaviour of R. nagaakii and passed these observations to the species' describers.
