= Marukawichthys ambulator =

Scientific classification
- Kingdom: Animalia
- Phylum: Chordata
- Class: Actinopterygii
- Division: Teleostei
- Order: Perciformes
- Suborder: Cottoidei
- Family: Rhamphocottidae
- Genus: Marukawichthys
- Species: M. ambulator

Binomial name
- Marukawichthys ambulator Sakamoto, 1931

Species of sculpin

Marukawichtys ambulator, commonly known as Marukawa sculpin, is a species of deep-sea sculpin found in the north-western Pacific Ocean. First described by Sakamoto in 1931, this species has been observed off the east coast of Japan, as well as at the Kimmei and Koko seamounts in the Pacific ocean.
