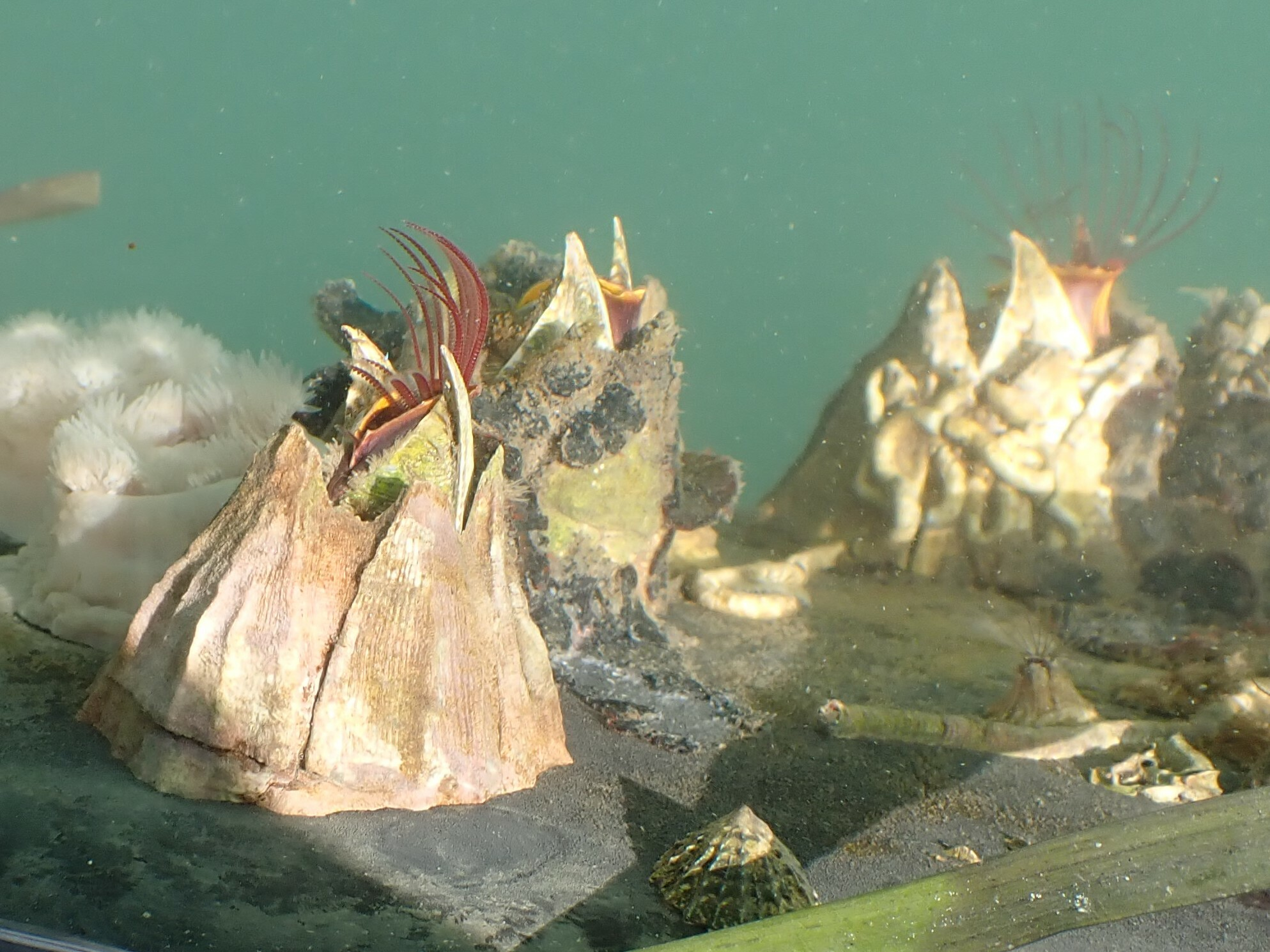
- Balanus nubilus

Scientific classification
- Kingdom: Animalia
- Phylum: Arthropoda
- Clade: Pancrustacea
- Class: Thecostraca
- Subclass: Cirripedia
- Order: Balanomorpha
- Family: Balanidae
- Genus: Balanus da Costa, 1778

Type species
- Balanus balanus Linnaeus, 1758

Species
- See text

= Balanus =

Balanus Temporal range: Jurassic - Recent

Genus of barnacles

Balanus is a genus of barnacles in the family Balanidae of the subphylum Crustacea.

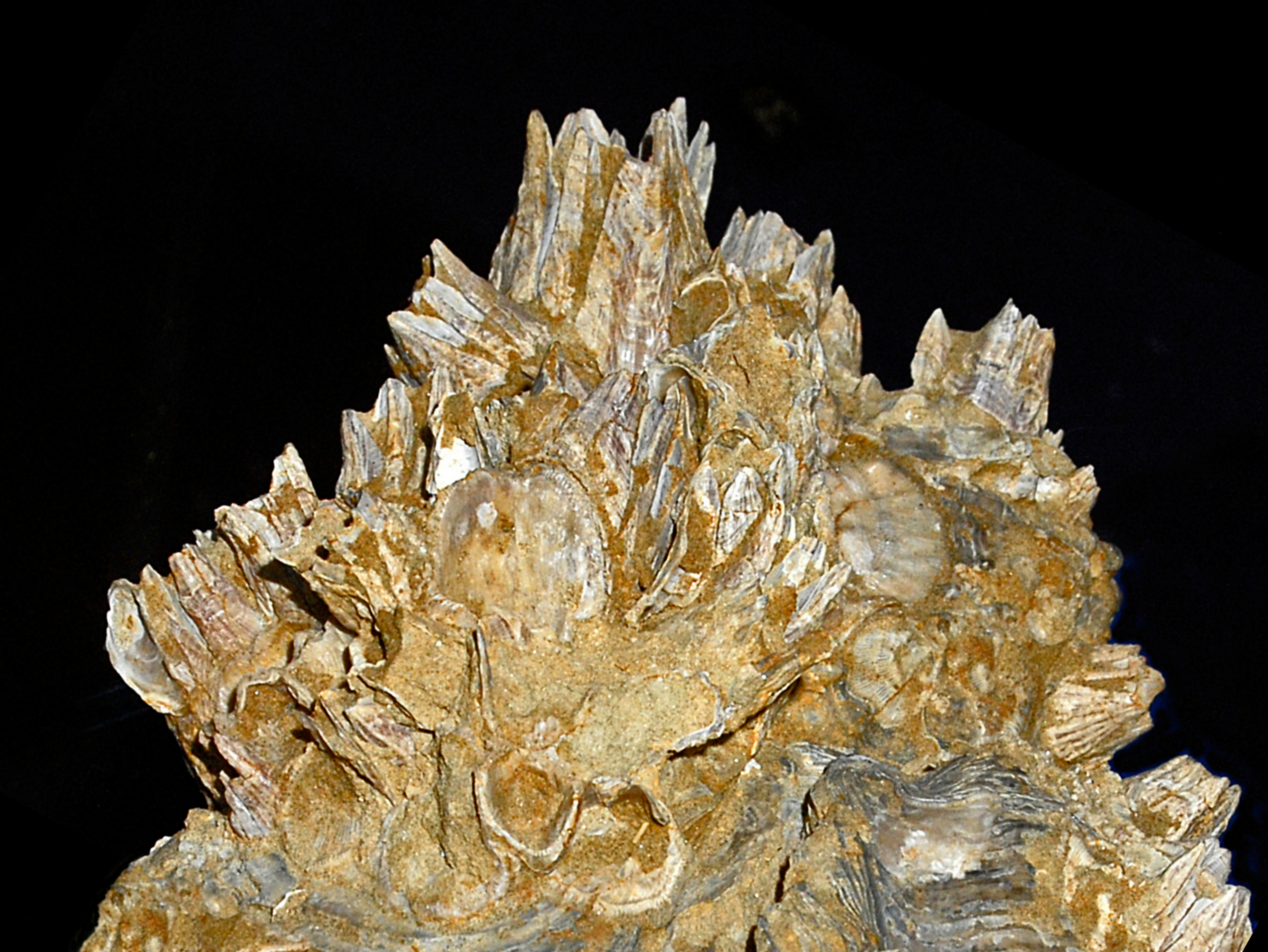
Fossil shells of Balanus from Pliocene

This genus is known in the fossil record from the Jurassic to the Quaternary periods (age range: from 189.6 to 0.0 million years ago.). Fossil shells within this genus have been found all over the world.

== Description ==
The bodies of these organisms are totally enclosed by a stony gray-whitish shell. The size of these shells ranges from 5 millimeters to 10 centimeters. They take the form of a cone consisting of six plates fixed on the rocks. The active animal can only be observed within the water when the shell opens and the barnacles expose two branched appendages (cirri ) regularly hitting the water to catch food. They mainly feed on plankton.

== Habitat ==
These barnacles can be found in coastal areas at low shallow depth, although they can also be seen living out of the water. They commonly colonize stones, rocks and shells. They are found in abundance on the shells of mussels.

== Species ==
Species within the genus Balanus include:

- Balanus balanus (Linnaeus, 1758)
- Balanus bloxhamensis Weisbord, 1966
- Balanus borsodensis Kolosváry, 1952
- Balanus calidus Pilsbry, 1916
- Balanus campbelli Filhol, 1886
- Balanus chisletianus Sowerby, 1859
- Balanus citerosum Henry, 1973
- Balanus connelli Cornwall, 1927
- Balanus crenatus Bruguière, 1789
- Balanus curvirostratus Menesini, 1968
- Balanus darwinii Seguenza, 1876
- Balanus ecuadoricus Pilsbry & Olson, 1951
- Balanus flosculoidus Kolosváry, 1941
- Balanus gizellae Kolosváry, 1967
- Balanus glandula Darwin, 1854 (Common Acorn Barnacle)
- Balanus hohmanni Philippi, 1887
- †Balanus humilis Conrad, 1846 (extinct)
- †Balanus imitator Zullo, 1984 (extinct)
- Balanus irradians Zullo & Guruswami-Naidu, 1982
- Balanus irregularis Broch, 1931
- Balanus kanakoffi Zullo, 1969
- Balanus kondakovi Tarasov & Zevina, 1957
- Balanus laevis Bruguière, 1789
- Balanus laguairensis Weisbord, 1966
- Balanus leonensis Weisbord, 1966
- Balanus microstomus Philippi, 1887
- Balanus minutus Hoek, 1913
- Balanus mirabilis Krüger, 1912
- Balanus newburnensis Weisbord, 1966
- Balanus nubilus Darwin, 1854 (Giant acorn barnacle)
- Balanus ochlockoneensis Weisbord, 1966
- Balanus pannonicus Kolosváry, 1952
- Balanus parkeri Zullo, 1967
- Balanus perforatus Bruguière, 1789: synonym of Perforatus perforatus (Bruguière, 1789)
- Balanus poecilus Darwin, 1854
- Balanus polyporus Pilbry, 1924
- Balanus provisoricus Kolosváry, 1961
- Balanus pulchellus Ren, 1989
- Balanus rhizophorae Ren & Liu, 1978
- Balanus rostratus Hoek, 1883 (Minefujitsubo) (Japanese acorn barnacle)
- Balanus sauntonensis Parfitt, 1871
- Balanus similis Weltner, 1922
- Balanus spongicola Brown, 1844
- Balanus subalbidus Henry, 1974
- Balanus tamiamiensis Ross, 1964
- Balanus trigonus Darwin, 1854
- Balanus tuboperforatus Kolosváry, 1962
- Balanus tumorifer Kolosváry, 1962
- Balanus uliginosis Henry, 1973
- Balanus vadaszi Kolosváry, 1949
- Balanus veneticensis Seguenza, 1876
- Balanus withersi Pilsbry, 1930

The species Balanus balanoides (common barnacle, common rock barnacle, northern rock barnacle) has been reclassified as Semibalanus balanoides in the family Archaeobalanidae, due to its membranous base.
