= Strandiellum =

Scientific classification
- Kingdom: Animalia
- Phylum: Arthropoda
- Subphylum: Chelicerata
- Class: Arachnida
- Order: Araneae
- Infraorder: Araneomorphae
- Family: Sparassidae
- Genus: Strandiellum; Kolosváry, 1934
- Species: S. wilhelmshafeni

Binomial name
- Strandiellum wilhelmshafeni Kolosváry, 1934

Genus of spiders

Strandiellum is a monotypic genus of Papuan huntsman spiders containing the single species, Strandiellum wilhelmshafeni. It was first described by Gábor Kolosváry in 1934, and is found in Papua New Guinea.
