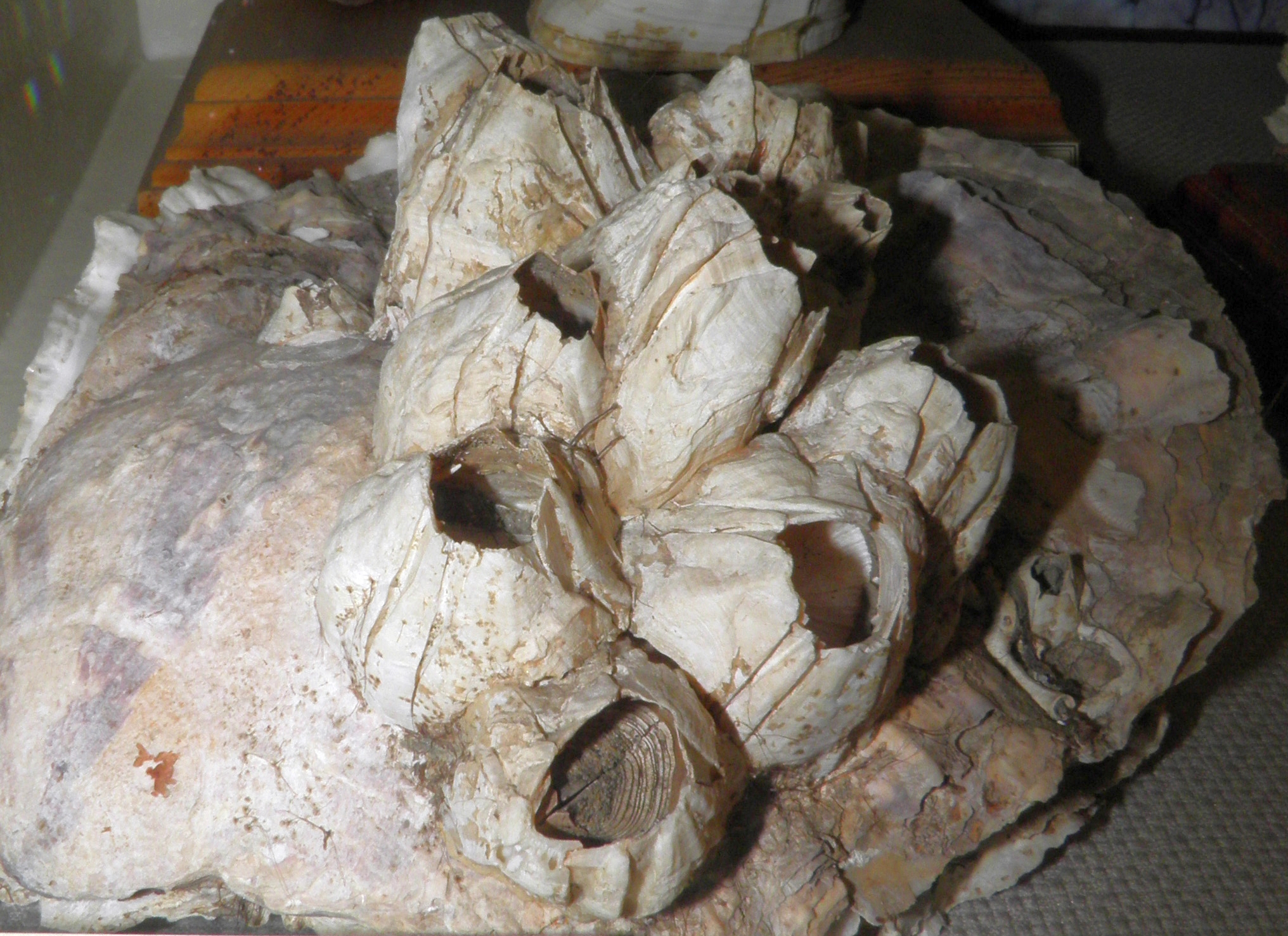

Scientific classification
- Domain: Eukaryota
- Kingdom: Animalia
- Phylum: Arthropoda
- Class: Thecostraca
- Subclass: Cirripedia
- Order: Balanomorpha
- Family: Balanidae
- Genus: Balanus
- Species: B. rostratus

Binomial name
- Balanus rostratus Hoek, 1883

= Balanus rostratus =

Balanus rostratus Temporal range: Pliocene–Recent

Species of barnacle

Balanus rostratus, the rostrate barnacle, is a species of acorn barnacle found primarily in the North Pacific.

== Classification ==
Balanus rostratus was first scientifically described under its present name by Paulus Hoek in 1883, in the eighth volume of the Report on the Scientific Results of the Voyage of H.M.S. Challenger During the Years 1873–76. The species' type locality is in Japanese waters near Kobe; the species was discovered in 1875, taken attached to a rock along with specimens of Balanus trigonus and Balanus amaryllis. Hoek thought the new species related to Balanus glandula and Balanus crenatus. The type specimens were relatively small. In English, B. rostratus is commonly called the "rostrate barnacle", while in Russian it is called "Клювоносный морской жёлудь" (lit. transl. beaked sea acorn).

Besides the implicit nominotypical subspecies, Balanus rostratus rostratus, four subspecies, B. r. alaskensis, B. r. apertus, B. r dalli, and B. r. heteropus were described by Henry Augustus Pilsbry; first apertus in 1911 and then the remaining three all at the same time in 1916.

== Fossil record ==
Fossils of Balanus rostratus have been recorded from several Pliocene deposits near Nome, Alaska.

== Interactions with humans ==
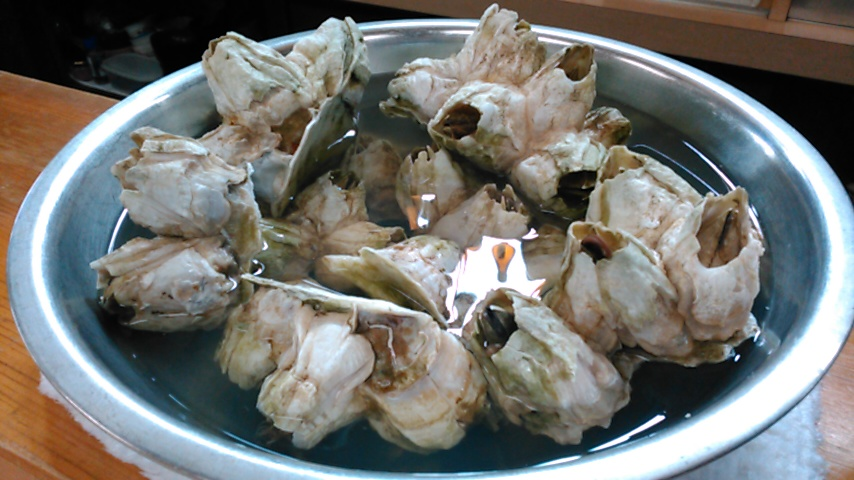
Balanus rostratus served in Aomori

=== As food ===
Balanus rostratus is fished for and eaten in Japan. In some markets, a kilogram of rostrate barnacles can fetch ¥2,000 (US$18.22), and there is some domestic trade for them. Aquaculture specifically for rostrate barnacles is done only by small-scale farms.
