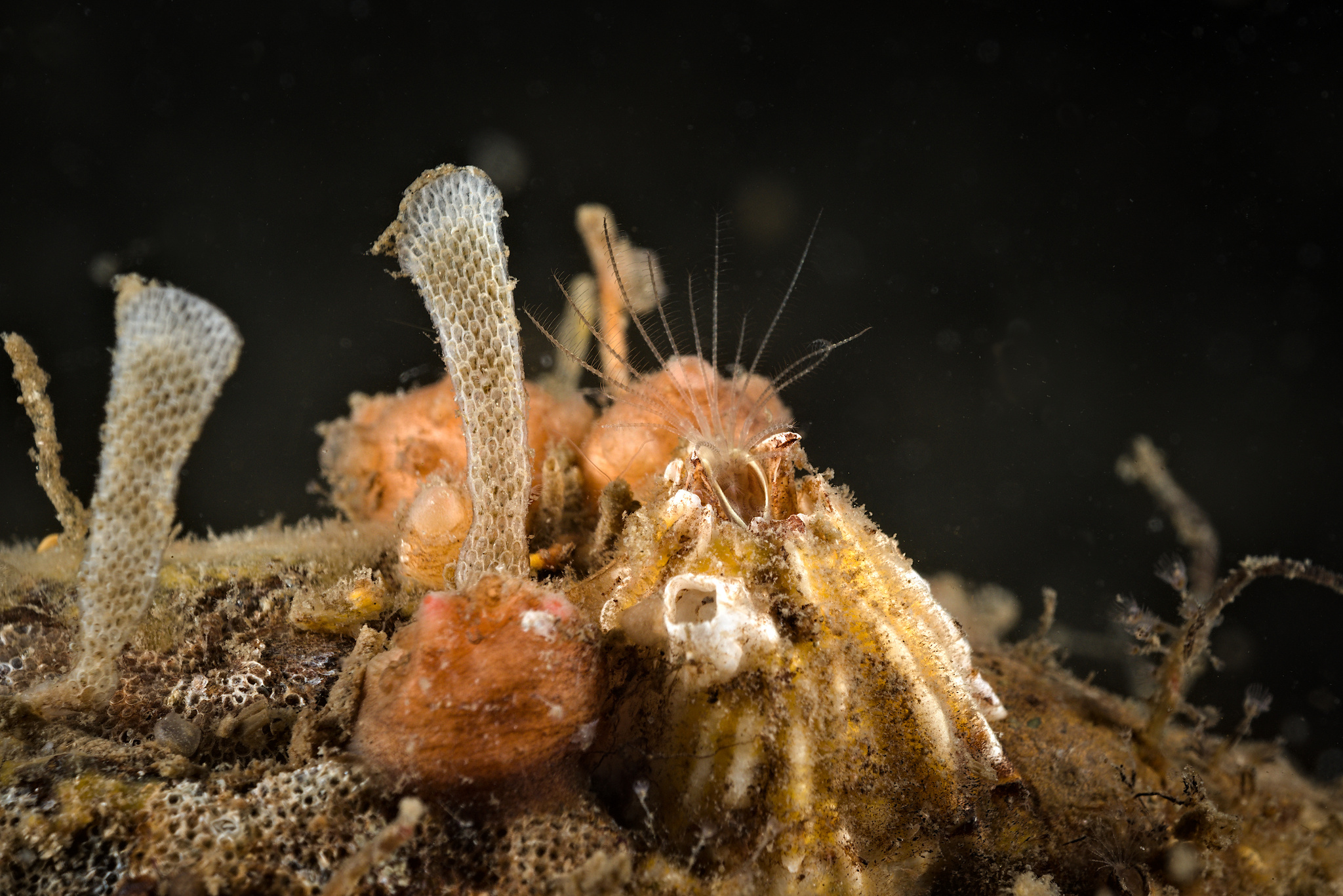

Scientific classification
- Kingdom: Animalia
- Phylum: Arthropoda
- Class: Thecostraca
- Subclass: Cirripedia
- Order: Balanomorpha
- Family: Balanidae
- Genus: Balanus
- Species: B. balanus

Binomial name
- Balanus balanus (Linnaeus, 1758)

= Balanus balanus =

Species of barnacle

Balanus balanus is a species of acorn barnacle in the Balanidae family. It is native to the colder seas of the Northern Hemisphere.

== Description ==
Unlike most crustaceans, barnacles are unable to move from place to place. Cement glands near the base of the antennae fix them to the rock. The carapace of this species is conical with a circular base which has an irregular edge and a diameter of up to three centimeters. The surface is ridged and white or pale brown. The cover plates protecting the opening are shaped like the beak of a bird.

== Ecology ==
This species is found at depths of up to 150 metres (490 ft), commonly between 20 -- 30 meters and grows on bedrock, boulders, pebbles and shells. It seems to favor habitats with strong currents and when overcrowding occurs, adopts different shapes to fit the space available. It is often found growing alongside another barnacle, Balanus crenatus. Other species often found in its vicinity include Tubularia larynx, Obelia geniculata, Pomatoceros triqueter, Pecten maximus, Hydroides norvegica, Chlamys opercularis and Sertularia species. Coralline algae was often present as were the whelk, the European edible sea urchin (Echinus esculentus), the great spider crab (Hyas araneus) and the shore crab (Carcinus maenas).

The main predator is the juvenile common starfish (Asterias rubens). Medium sized barnacles seem to be at greatest risk. Small specimens are ignored while large specimens seem able to withstand attack. Other predators are snails, worms and birds.

== Distribution ==
Balanus balanus is found in the Arctic Ocean and the more northerly seas of the northern hemisphere. It has been introduced to Argentina where it is displacing other species and is considered invasive.

== Biology ==
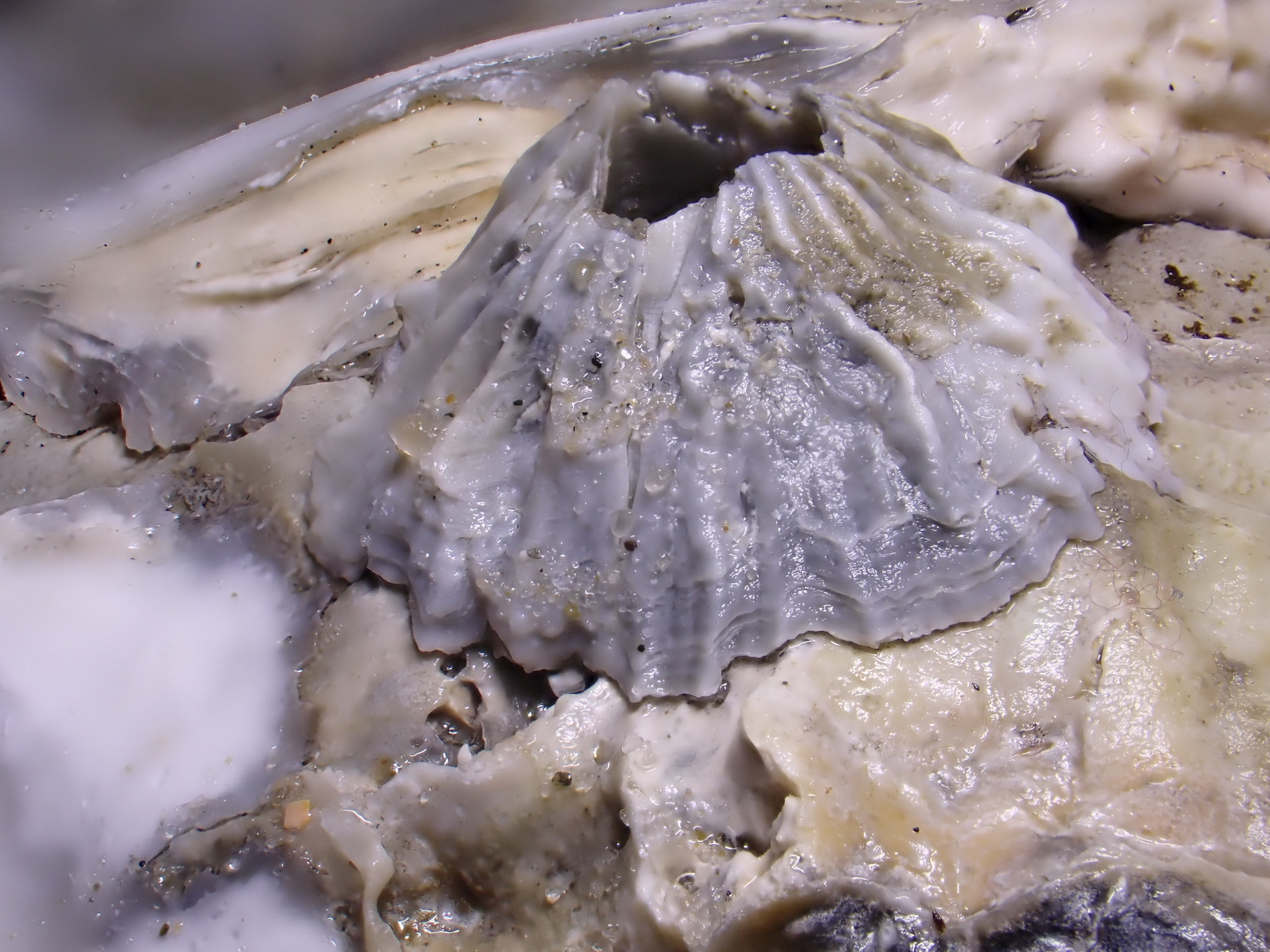

Larvae settle out of the zooplankton in about April and attach themselves to objects on the sea floor. The newly metamorphosed cyprid develops slowly reaching 1 millimetre (0.039 in) diameter in a few weeks and 7 mm (0.28 in) by September. The growth rate then slows over the winter so that the year old barnacle averages 8 mm (0.31 in). Thereafter it grows at 5–10 mm (0.20–0.39 in) a year and the largest specimens, 30–40 mm (1.2–1.6 in) across are probably four to six years old. Under experimental conditions of total submersion growth is faster and more nearly resemble growth rates of Semibalanus balanoides and Balanus crenatus. This may be because these barnacles, being always under water, have a greater continuity of food supply. There is a wide variation in rate of growth and the factors affecting it include currents and nutrient content. A scarcity of diatoms in mid-summer may slow growth at this time.

Balanus balanus is a cross-fertilizing hermaphrodite and the single brood of nauplii is produced in the middle of winter. In mature individuals (barnacles at least ten millimeters in diameter) the white vesiculae seminales are very much enlarged at this time and filled with spermatozoa, occupying much of the body cavity and the penis is also greatly enlarged. At the same time, a creamy mass of eggs are present in the ovarian tubules. Fertilisation takes place over the course of a few days in each group of barnacles and the fertilized eggs change to an orange colour and then to a greyish-brown as the nauplii develop. New ovaries begin to form soon after fertilization, and the testes re-develop during the summer with the size of the penis being reduced. After about forty days of embryonic development, the nauplii are liberated into the water. Many first year specimens are not fully mature in their first winter but those that are liberate 3,000 to 4,000 nauplii. Second year individuals at an average size of twenty millimeters will produce about 20,000 nauplii, whilst larger individuals of thirty millimeters may produce over 100,000.

The nauplii feed, moult five times and swim with their antennae. It takes about one month for them to develop into the cyprid larvae, the non-feeding stage before adulthood.
