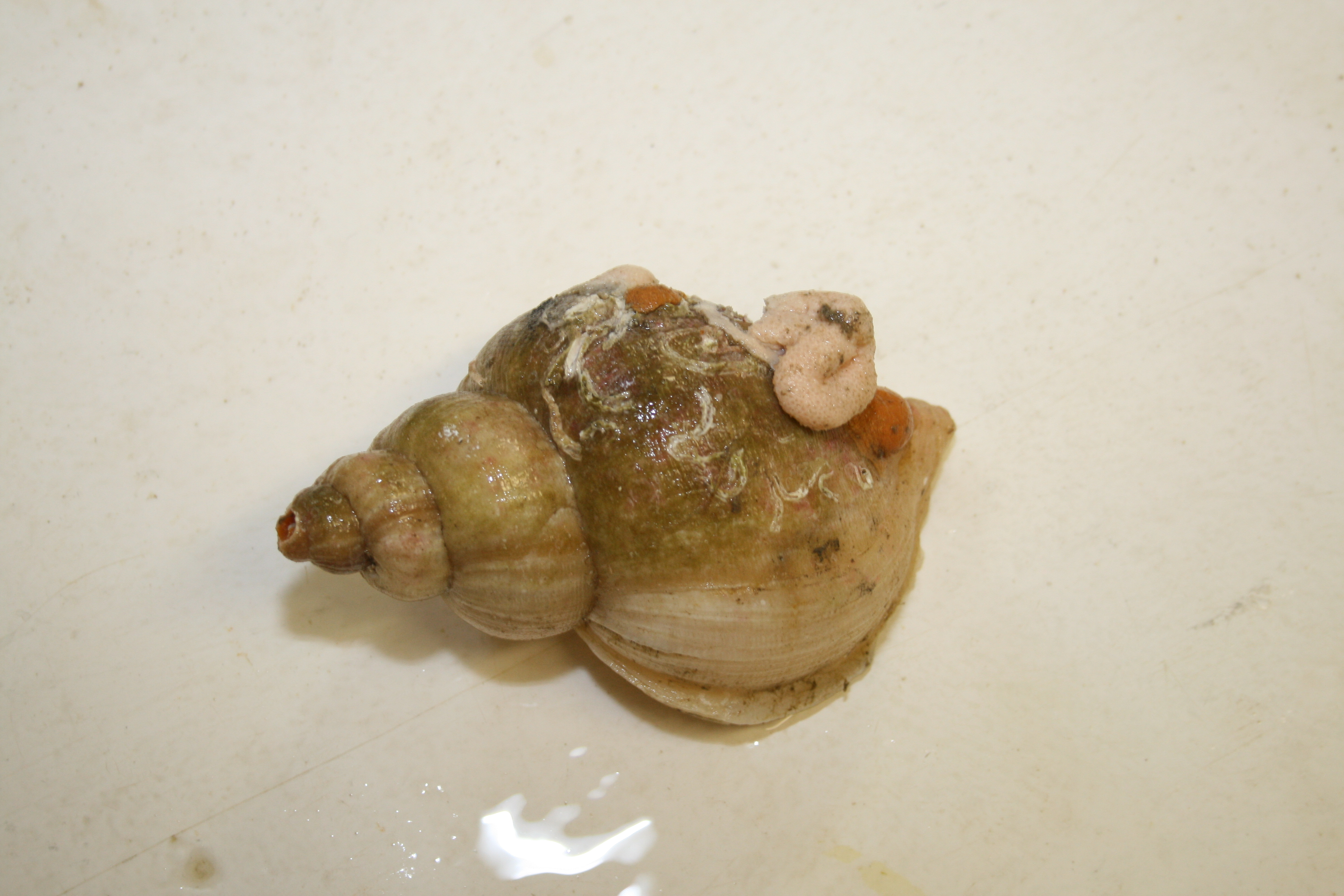
- Live individual of Neptunea antiqua
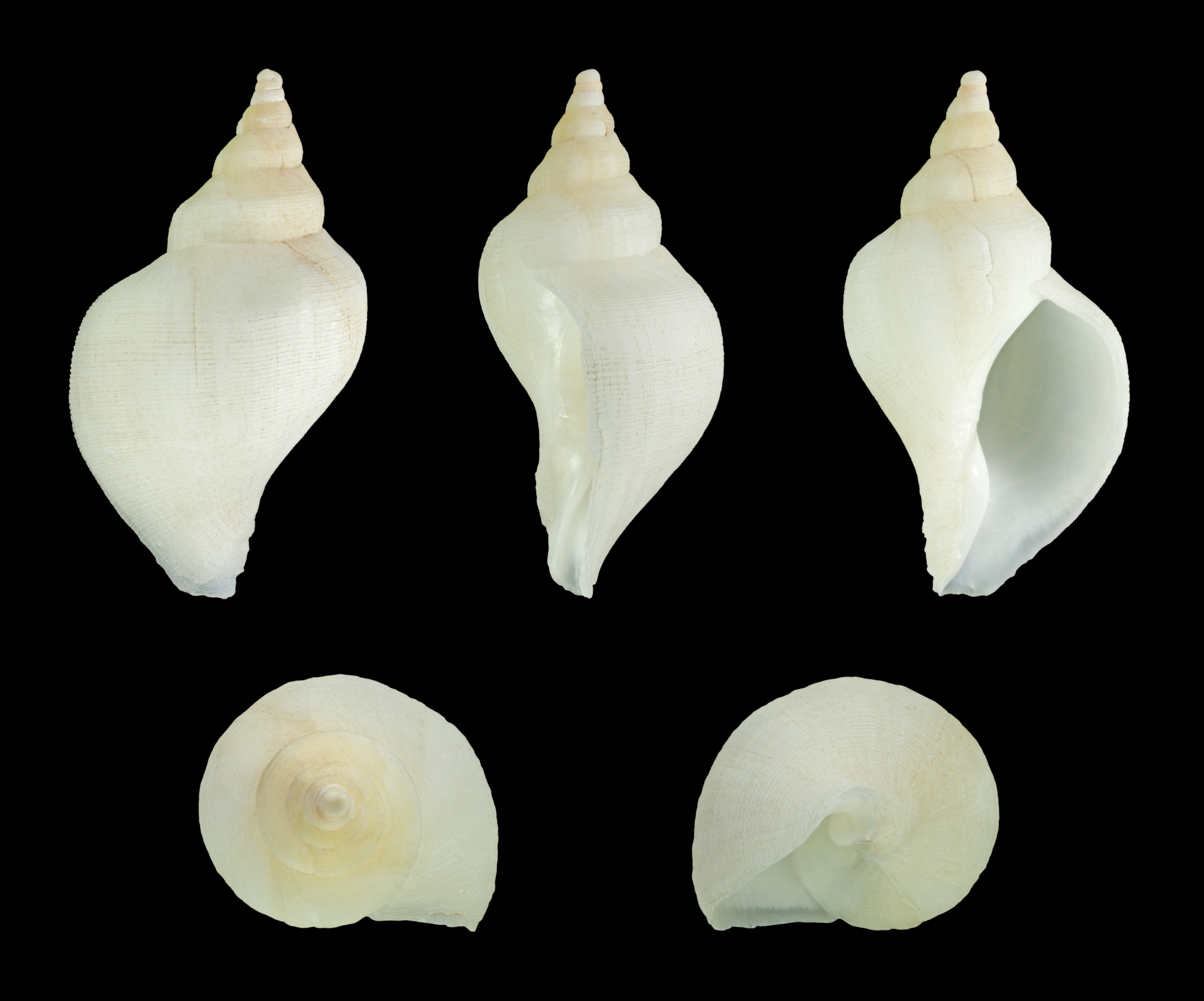
- Shell

Scientific classification
- Kingdom: Animalia
- Phylum: Mollusca
- Class: Gastropoda
- Subclass: Caenogastropoda
- Order: Neogastropoda
- Family: Buccinidae
- Genus: Neptunea
- Species: N. antiqua

Binomial name
- Neptunea antiqua (Linnaeus, 1758)

= Neptunea antiqua =

Red whelk

Species of gastropod

Neptunea antiqua, common name the red whelk, is a species of Northeast Atlantic sea snail, a marine gastropod mollusk in the family Buccinidae, the true whelks.

== Description ==
N. antiqua resembles Buccinum undatum (common whelk). It can grow to a length of 20 cm (7.9 in), although most specimens only reach half that size. It is the largest marine snail in parts of its range.

== Distribution ==
N. antiqua is found in the Northeast Atlantic along cold-temperate European coasts, ranging from the low water mark to a depth of 1,200 m (3,900 ft).

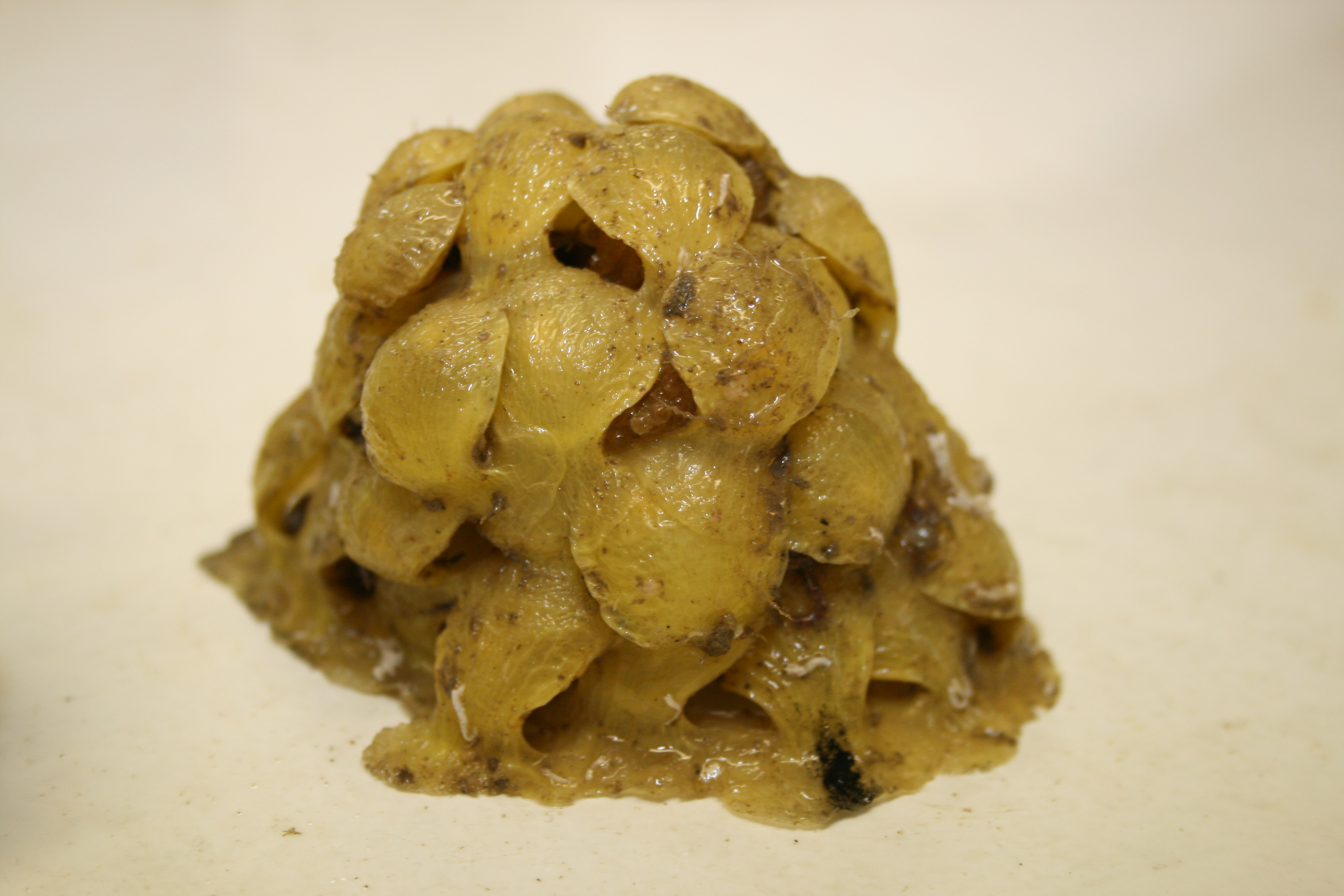
Eggs of Neptunea antiqua

== Feeding ==
N. antiqua is primarily a scavenger, although it has been recorded attacking and eating some living polychaete species. Unlike several of its more predatory relatives, experiments have shown that even hungry N. antiqua are not attracted to living undamaged mussels.

== Food poisoning ==
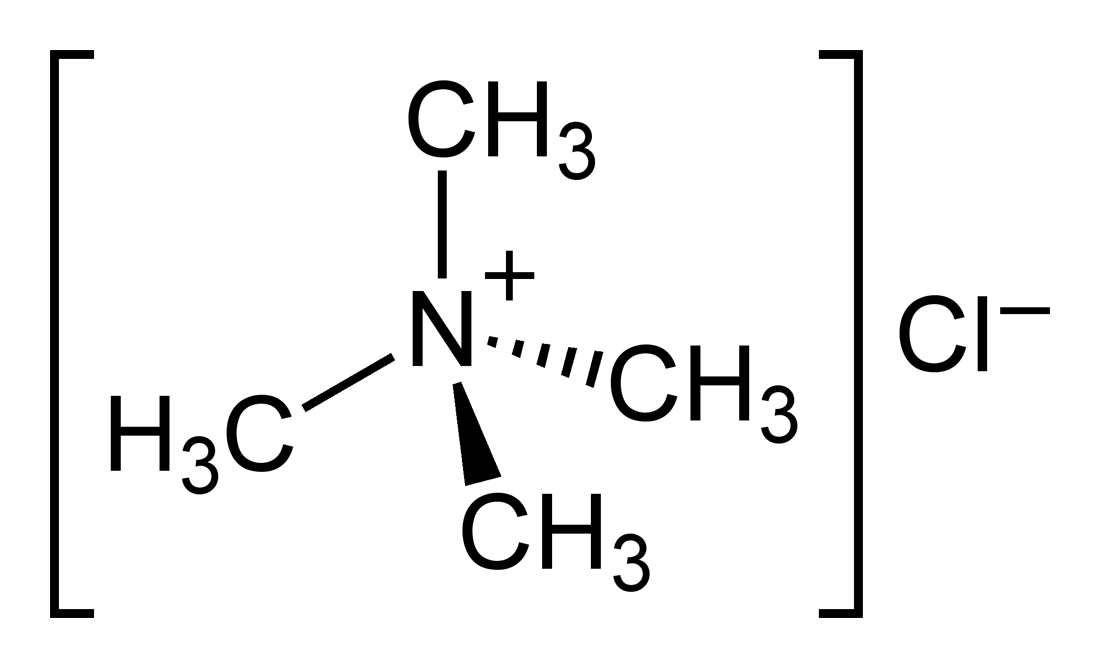
Tetramethylammonium chloride, the principal toxin in red whelks

N. antiqua contains tetramethylammonium salts (most likely the chloride) in its tissues, and has been the source of non-lethal human poisoning.
