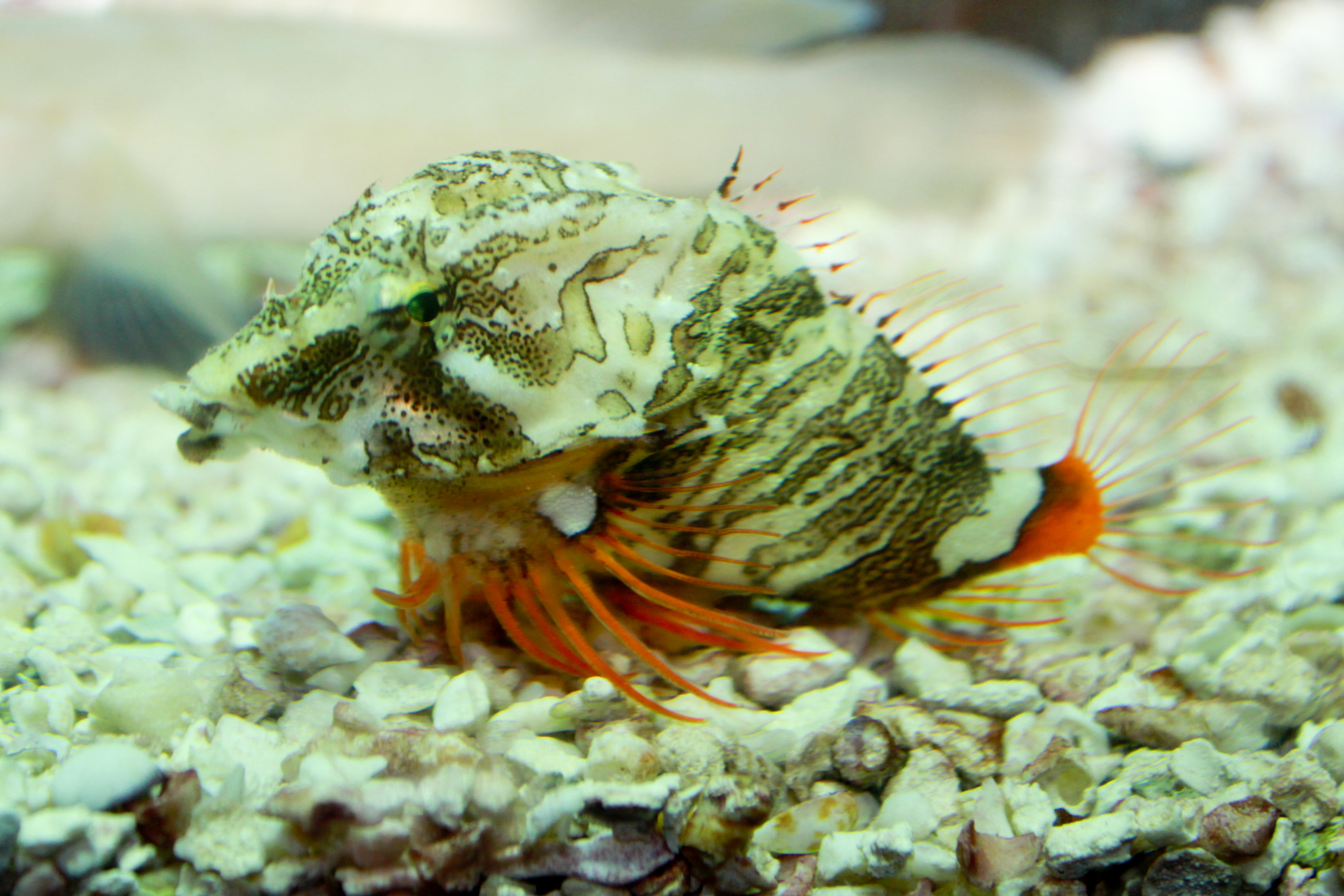

Conservation status
- Least Concern (IUCN 3.1)

Scientific classification
- Kingdom: Animalia
- Phylum: Chordata
- Class: Actinopterygii
- Division: Teleostei
- Order: Perciformes
- Suborder: Cottoidei
- Superfamily: Cottoidea
- Family: Rhamphocottidae
- Genus: Rhamphocottus
- Species: R. richardsonii

Binomial name
- Rhamphocottus richardsonii Günther, 1874

= Grunt sculpin =

Species of fish

The grunt sculpin or grunt-fish (Rhamphocottus richardsonii) is a small fish mainly found in the eastern Pacific Ocean. The grunt sculpin generally remains close to shore and is often found in empty giant barnacle shells. The common name comes from reports that the fish vibrate or "grunt" when held. Its defining feature is its tendency to "hop" along the ocean floor on its orange fins. The short, stout body of the grunt sculpin has a long, small mouth which is adapted for eating smaller prey.

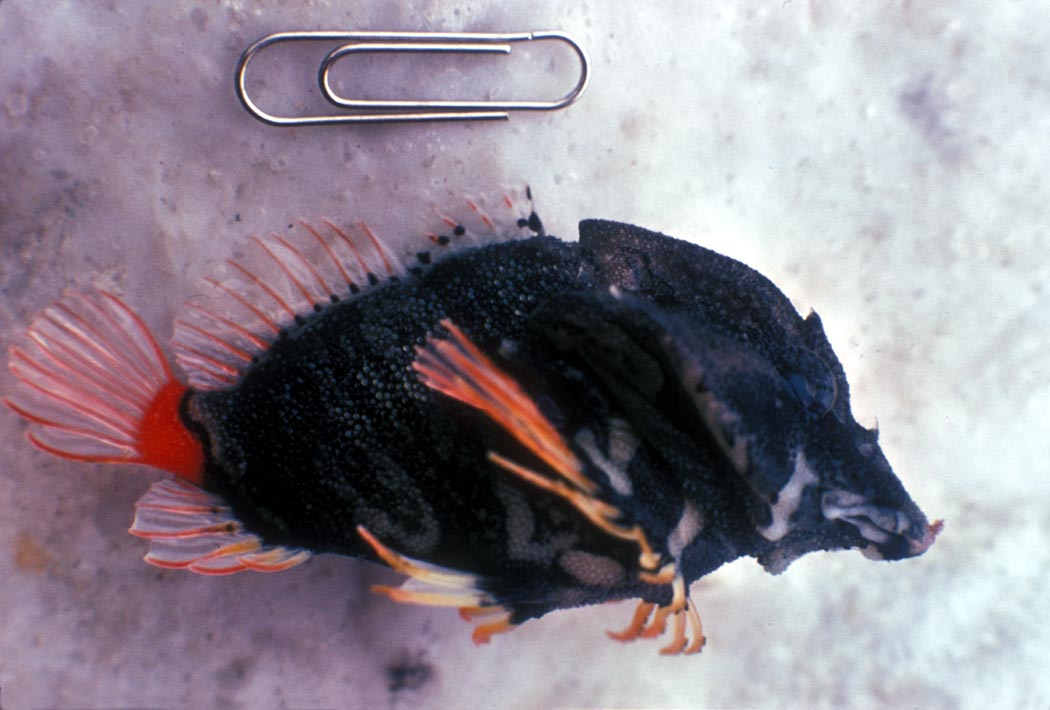
Grunt Sculpin, photograph courtesy United States Fish and Wildlife Service

== Taxonomy ==
It is a member of the class Actinopterygii, the ray-finned fishes. It is further classified into the order Scorpaeniformes, commonly known as the mail-cheeked fishes. The superfamily Cottoidea which is classified within this order includes R. richardsonii and all other sculpins. However, the grunt sculpin was regarded as the only member of the family Rhamphocottidae until the Ereuniidae was synonymized with Rhamphocottidae. The records from the western North Pacific are now thought to probably refer to Rhamphocottus nagaaki which was described as a new species in 2022.

Its genus name comes from rhampos meaning snout and kottus meaning sculpin based on its physical characteristics. Its species name honors the Scottish naturalist John Richardson. It was first formally described by the German born British ichthyologist and herpetologist Albert Günther in 1874 with its type locality given as Fort Rupert, British Columbia.

== Description ==
The largest recorded length for the grunt sculpin is only 8.9 cm. Its main features are its big head, short, stout body, long pig snout, and orange fins. The body is usually a yellow color with brown stripes contrasted by its very orange pectoral fins. Compared to other sculpins, it has a small mouth with a longer snout affecting its feeding habits. Although it can swim in an abnormal manner with its head pointing up, it mainly "hops" along the bottom of the ocean using its several pectoral fins. It's phenotypically classified by its pectoral fins being separated from the upper lobe, the presence of anal and dorsal fin stays, and its hypural-parhypural bone being made of a singular piece.

== Distribution and habitat ==
The grunt sculpin is found around the coasts in the eastern Pacific Ocean, stretching from southern California to the Bering Sea, although it has also been seen off of the coast of Japan. In these regions, the grunt sculpin resides in a variety of habitats such as rocky shores, kelp forest, sandy beaches, and reefs. In these habitats, it generally remains in shallower waters (as shallow as two meters) but it has been found at depths of 165 meters. It prefers to shelter in empty giant barnacles, but it will also live in debris under piers and floats in the absence of giant barnacles. Within the barnacles, the grunt sculpin will stick out its fins and wave them around to try to mimic the appearance and movement of the cirri of a living barnacle.

== Diet ==
The grunt sculpin has a small mouth for a sculpin, therefore it mainly preys on small crustaceans but sometimes small fishes and worms as well. Classifying whether R. richardsonii are ram or suction feeders is difficult as it has physical features of both types and it feeds on both prey types (elusive and grasping) with similar success, though it fares better with smaller elusive prey. Ram feeders envelop the prey with a quick movement of their body while suction feeders use negative pressure to draw water and prey into their mouths. Elusive prey are prey that can initiate evasive maneuvers while grasping prey tend to hold onto the substrate to avoid being eaten. R. richarsonii tend to attack with lower velocities and from shorter distances (less than half its body length away) in comparison to other Cottidae fishes.

== Reproduction ==
Spawning generally occurs at the rocky shores from August to October. The female is the dominant mate in reproduction and will chase and trap the male within a rocky crevice until she has laid all her eggs (about 150). The eggs will hatch 16–20 weeks after fertilization depending on the temperature conditions. Larvae forms have been reported from March to June. The larvae must remain near the shore as that is the habitat in which the grunt sculpin can survive. If the larva is lost to planktonic dispersal in the open ocean then the fish is unlikely to survive. How the larvae are adapted and influenced by environmental factors to remain close to shore is unclear.
