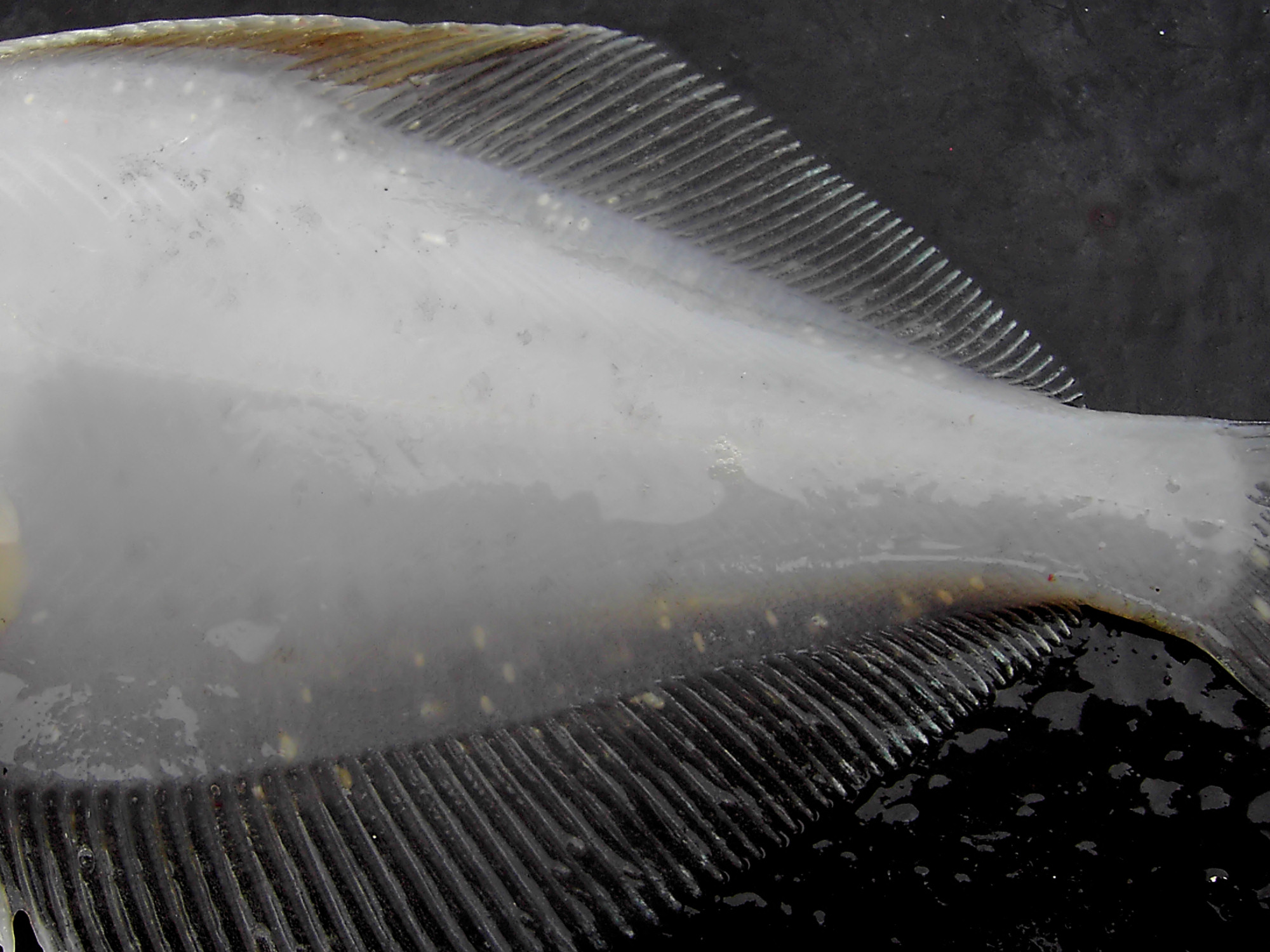
- Stephanostomum baccatum on a common dab Limanda limanda, from the Belgian coastal waters: The whitish spots are embedded individual trematodes.
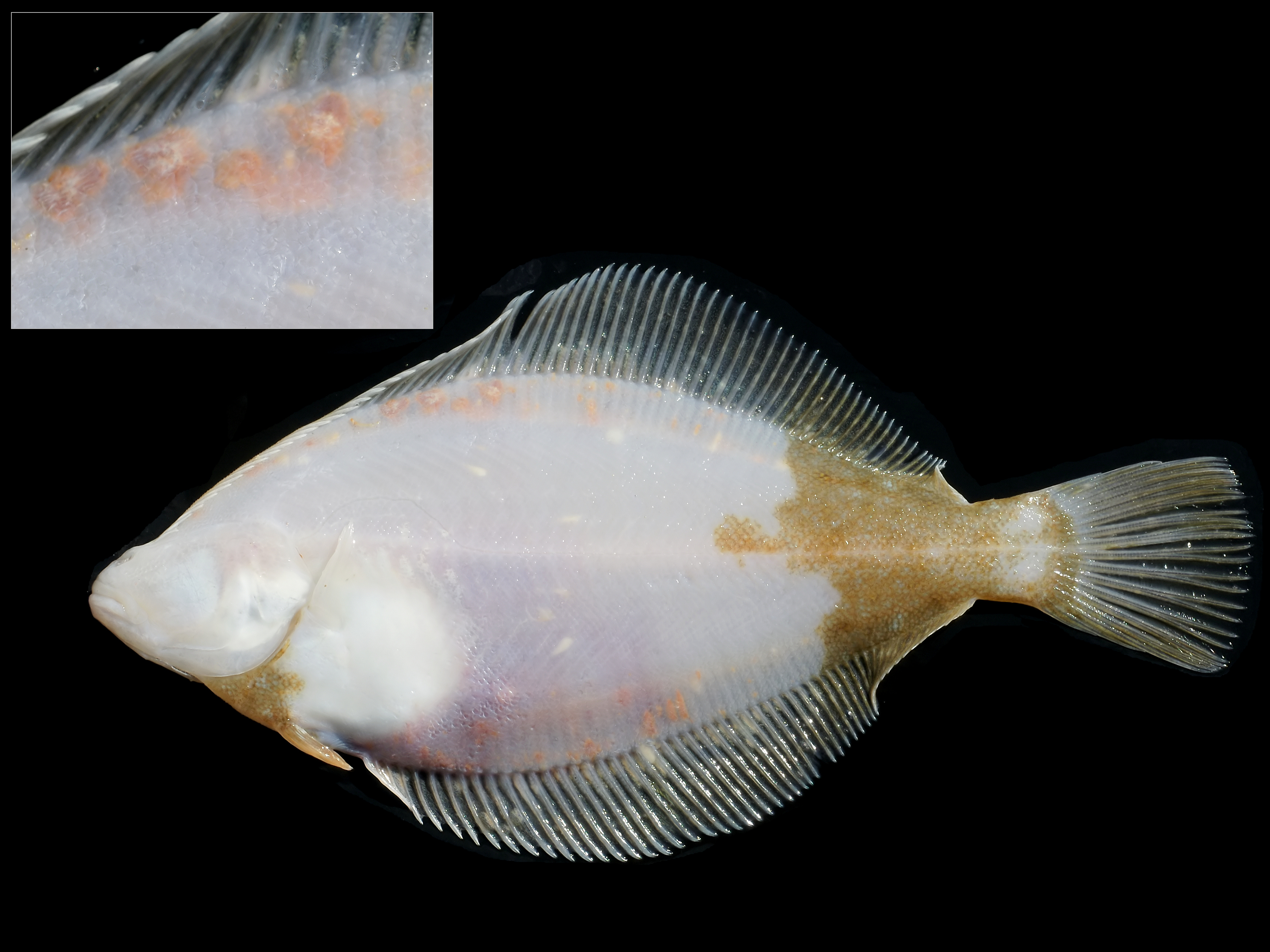

Scientific classification
- Kingdom: Animalia
- Phylum: Platyhelminthes
- Class: Trematoda
- Order: Plagiorchiida
- Family: Acanthocolpidae
- Genus: Stephanostomum
- Species: S. baccatum

Binomial name
- Stephanostomum baccatum (Nicoll, 1907)

Synonyms
- Stephanochasmus baccatus Nicoll, 1907

= Stephanostomum baccatum =

Species of fluke

Stephanostomum baccatum is a species of parasitic flatworm in the family Acanthocolpidae.

Stephanostomum baccatum is a marine hermaphroditic endoparasite that feeds on its host. Larval stages have been found in the digestive gland of Buccinum undatum.

== Distribution ==
The distribution of S. baccatum includes:

- Southern Gaspé waters (Baie des Chaleurs, Gaspe Bay to American, Orphan and Bradelle banks; eastern boundary: Eastern Bradelle Valley)
- Prince Edward Island (from the northern tip of Miscou Island, N.B., to Cape Breton Island south of Cheticamp, including the Northumberland Strait and Georges Bay to the Canso Strait causeway)
- Laurentian Channel (bathyal zone)(Esquiman Channel),
- The lower Laurentian Channel (bathyal zone as far as Cabot Strait; Cape North, N.S., St. Paul Island to Cape Ray, NL).
