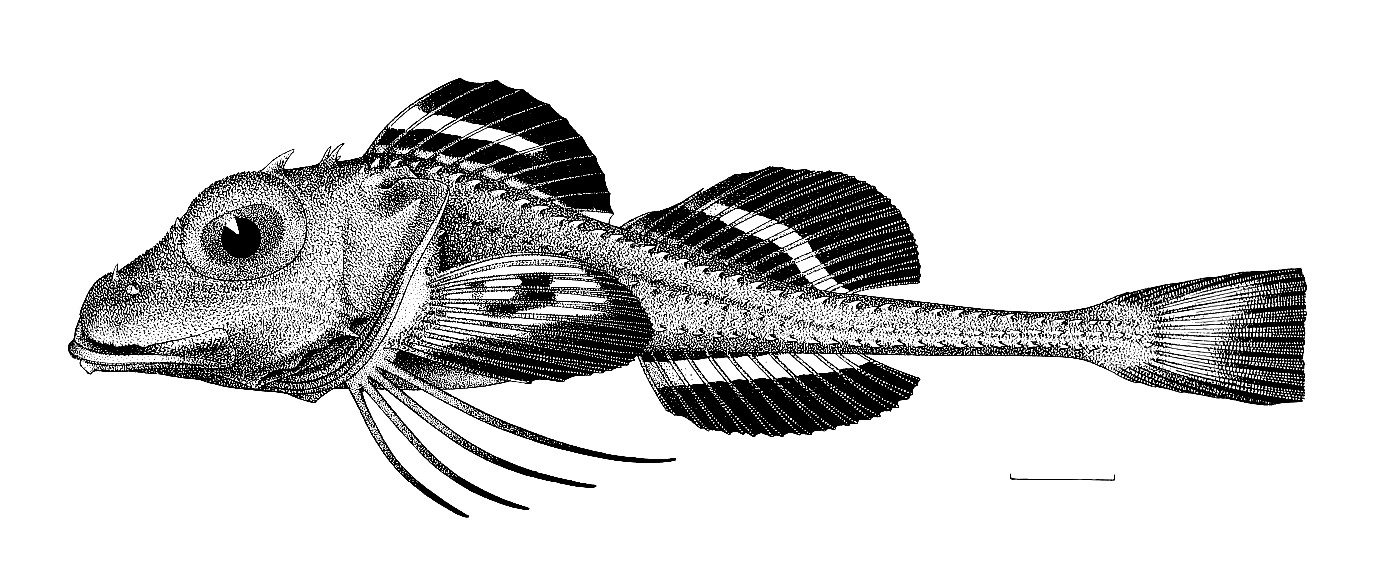

Scientific classification
- Kingdom: Animalia
- Phylum: Chordata
- Class: Actinopterygii
- Order: Perciformes
- Suborder: Cottoidei
- Family: Rhamphocottidae
- Genus: Ereunias; D. S. Jordan & Snyder, 1901
- Species: E. grallator

Binomial name
- Ereunias grallator D. S. Jordan & Snyder, 1901

= Ereunias =

Species of fish

Ereunias is a monotypic genus of marine ray-finned fish belonging to the family Rhamphocottidae, the grunt sculpins. Its only species is Ereunias grallator which is a bathydemersal species found at depths of around 500 m (1,600 ft) in the northwestern Pacific Ocean off Japan. This species attains a maximum published total length of 30 cm (12 in). This species was first formally described in 1901 by the American ichthyologists David Starr Jordan and John Otterbein Snyder from Misaki, Sagami in Japan. Jordan and Snyder proposed the new genus Ereunias for the new species. The genus name is derived from ereunao, meaning "to explore" which may refer how it uses elongated pectoral-fin rays as feelers or "feet" to explore the substrate; suffixed with ias which is used in some Greek names for fishes. The specific name grallator is "stiltwalker" in Latin and is an allusion to the elongated pectoral fin rays. Along with the genus Marukawichthys this taxon was classified in the family Ereunidae but this was synonymised with the Rhamphocottidae in 2014.
