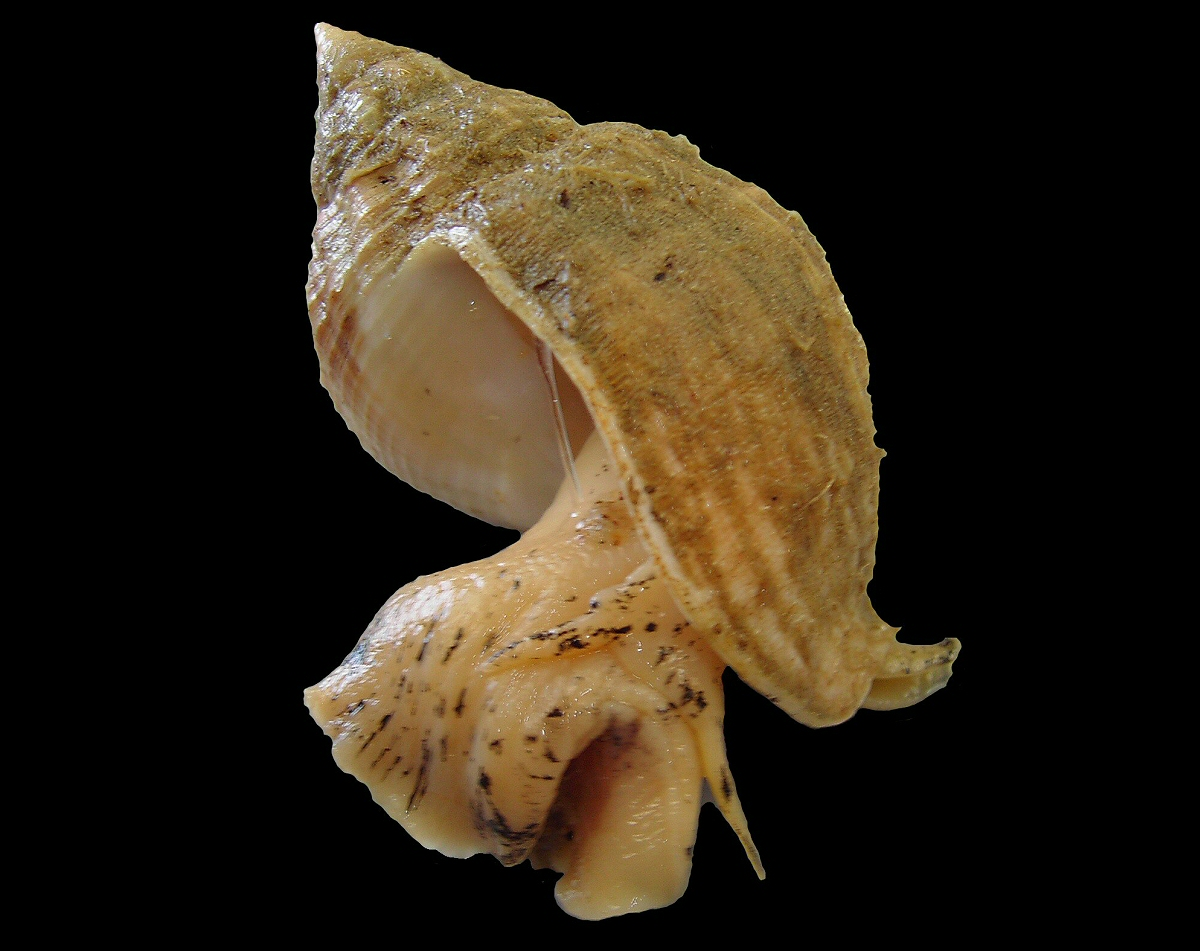
- A live individual of Buccinum undatum being held up above the substrate

Scientific classification
- Kingdom: Animalia
- Phylum: Mollusca
- Class: Gastropoda
- Subclass: Caenogastropoda
- Order: Neogastropoda
- Family: Buccinidae
- Genus: Buccinum
- Species: B. undatum

Binomial name
- Buccinum undatum Linnaeus, 1758

Synonyms
- Buccinum acuminatum Broderip, 1830 (dubious synonym); Buccinum amaliae Verkrüzen, 1878; Buccinum donovani Sars G.O., 1878; Buccinum meridionale Verkrüzen, 1884; Buccinum pictum Verkrüzen, 1881 (dubious synonym); Buccinum undatum var. caerulea Sars G.O., 1878; Buccinum undatum var. flexuosa Jeffreys, 1867; Buccinum undatum var. lactea Jeffreys, 1867; Buccinum undatum var. paupercula Jeffreys, 1867; Neptunea soluta (Hermann, 1781)

= Buccinum undatum =

Buccinum undatum Temporal range: 28.5Mya – present

Species of gastropod

Buccinum undatum, the common whelk or the waved buccinum, is a large, edible marine gastropod in the family Buccinidae, the "true whelks".

== Distribution ==
This species is a familiar part of the marine fauna of the Northern Atlantic and is found on the shores of the United Kingdom, Ireland, France, Norway, Iceland, various other northwest European countries, some Arctic islands, and North America as far south as New Jersey. They prefer colder temperatures, and cannot survive at temperatures above 29 °C (84 °F).

== Habitat ==
This species is mainly found on soft bottoms in the sublittoral zone, and occasionally on the littoral fringe, where it is sometimes found alive at low tide. It does not adapt well to life in the intertidal zone, due to its intolerance for low salinities. If exposed to air, it may crawl from its shell, risking desiccation.

Live Buccinum undatum
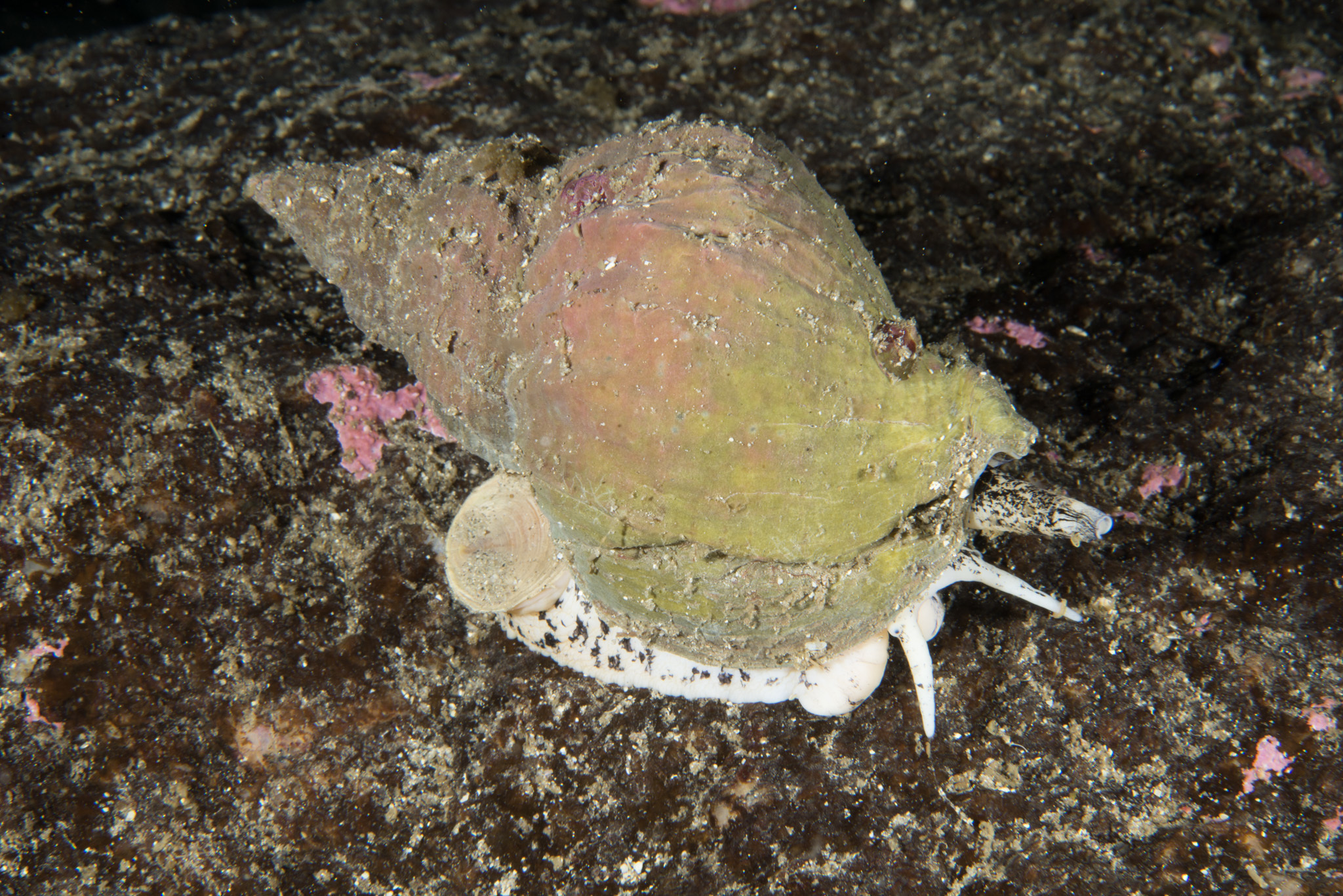
Buccinum undatum off Oanes, Norway

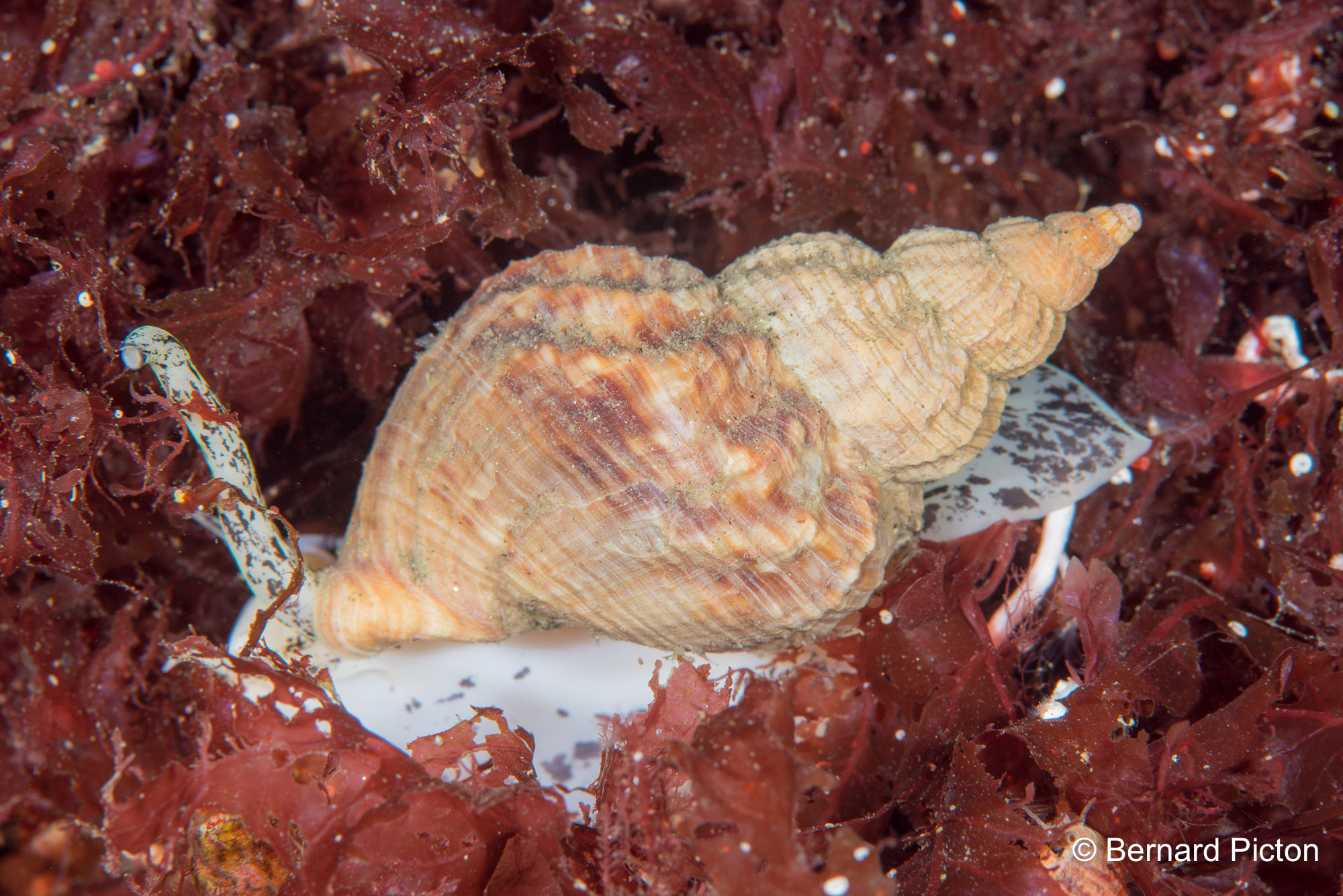
Buccinum undatum from Krakvika, Skjerstad Fjord, Norway

Buccinum undatum in the Netherlands, with visible hydroids (Hydractinia echinata) growing on its shell

Buccinum undatum looking for a partner and mating

== Shell ==
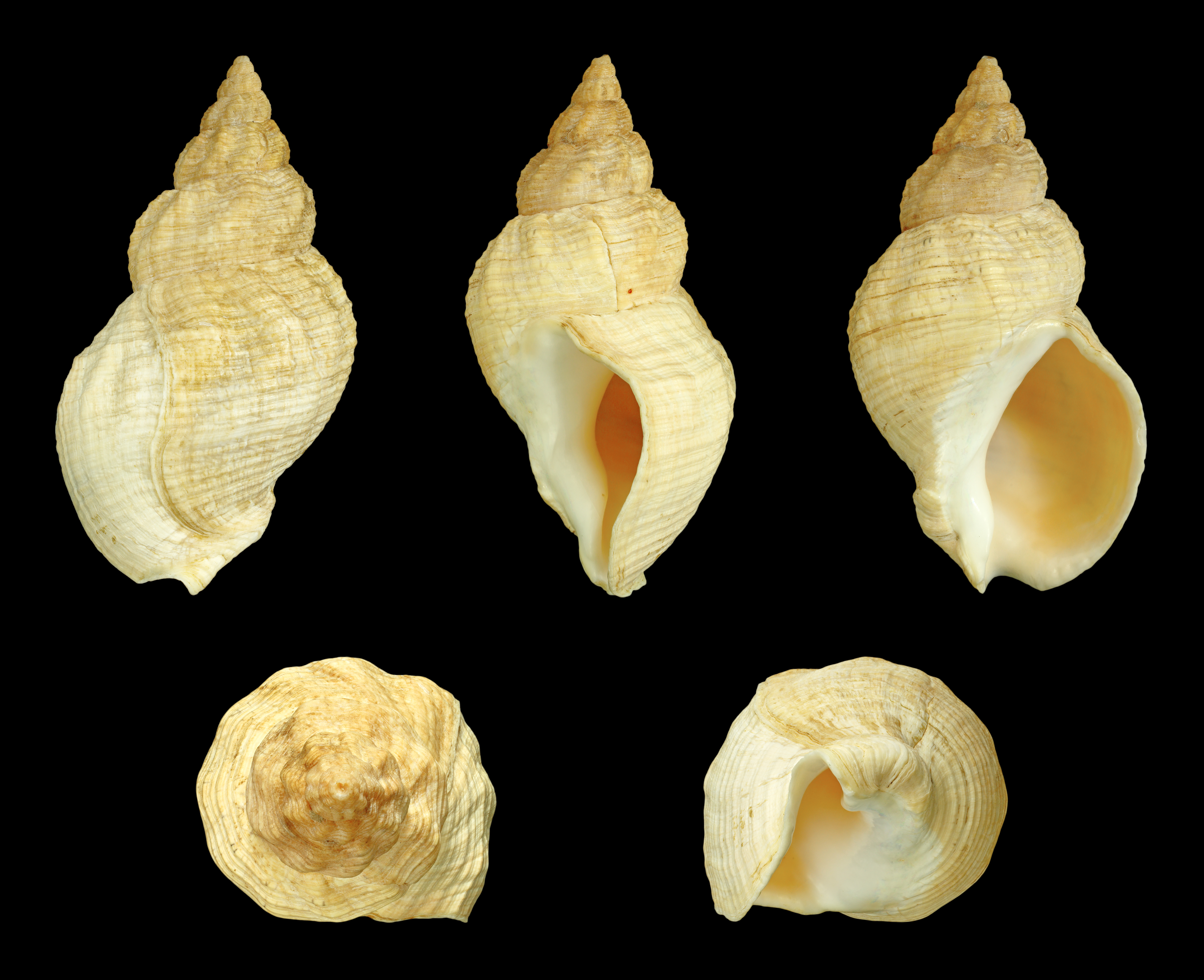
A shell of B. undatum

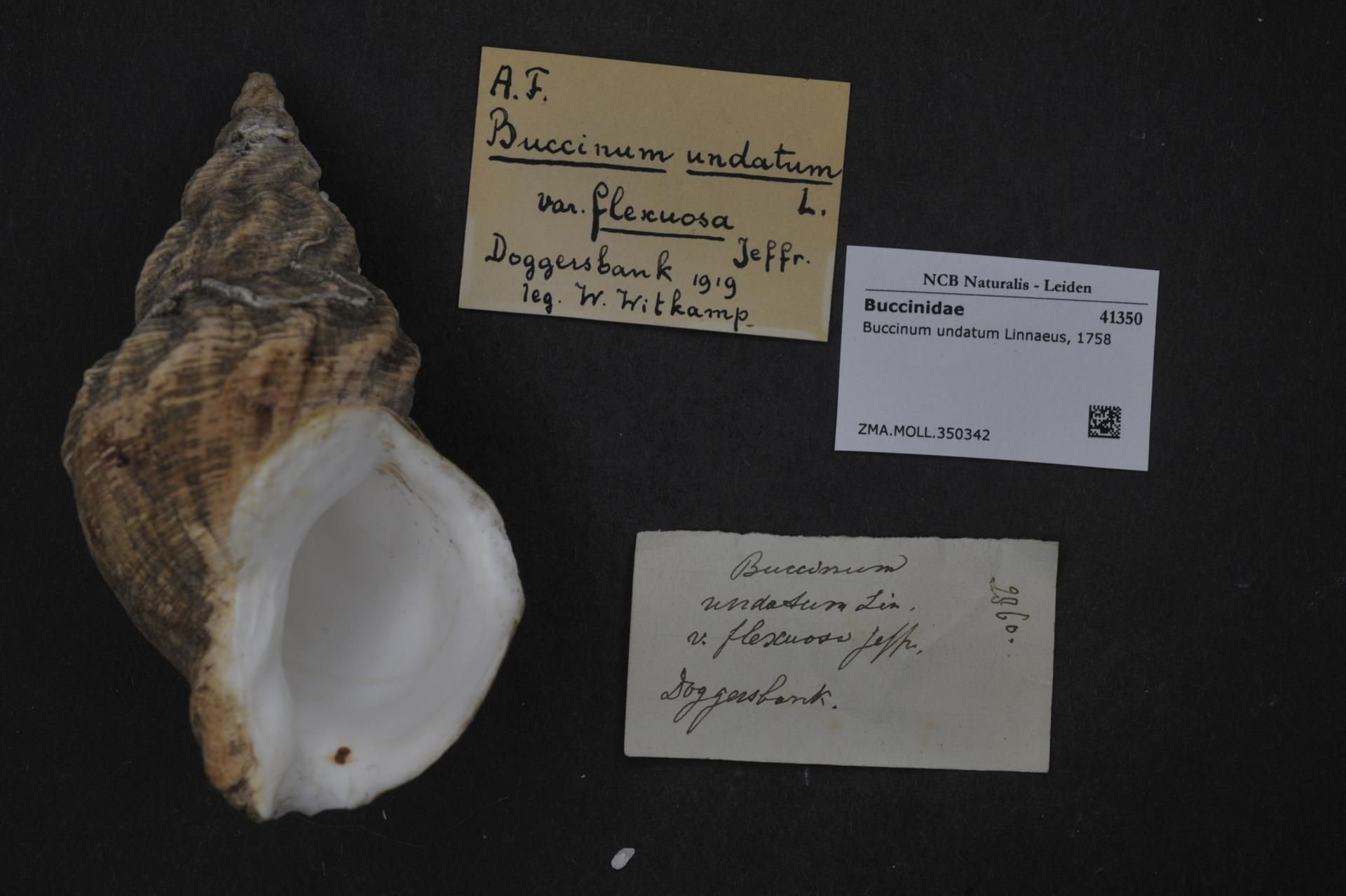
Buccinum undatum Linnaeus, 1758 – museum specimen

This species' solid, ovate-conical, ventricose shell is very pale, white, yellowish or reddish. In life, the shell is covered in a bright, yellowish-brown periostracum. The spire contains seven or eight whorls. These are convex and crossed by oblique folds, thick and waved. The shell surface has a sculpture of vertical, wavy folds (hence the name undatum, which means wavy). The wavy folds are crossed by numerous incised, very prominent spiral lines, some of which are paired. The white and very large aperture of the shell is broadly oval and tapers to a deeply notched siphonal canal. The outer lip is arched.

The maximum height of the shell is 10 cm (4 in) and the maximum width is 6 cm (2 1/2 in). The animal emits a thin and copious slime.

This species is very variable in size, and also in its form, which is more or less inflated. In many cases the oblique folds are not apparent, and sometimes the transverse striae have wholly disappeared. The epidermis is of a deep brown. It varies also in its coloring, which in some specimens is of a bright yellow or violet, surrounded with one or several reddish bands.

== Trophic connections ==
This species of whelk feeds on live bivalves, and are, in turn, preyed upon by several fish (cod, dogfish, etc.) and crustaceans. They may benefit from seastar feeding, by eating the extracted bivalve remains abandoned by the seastar.

== Parasites ==
Larval stages of Stephanostomum baccatum were found in the digestive gland of B. undatum.

== As a food item ==
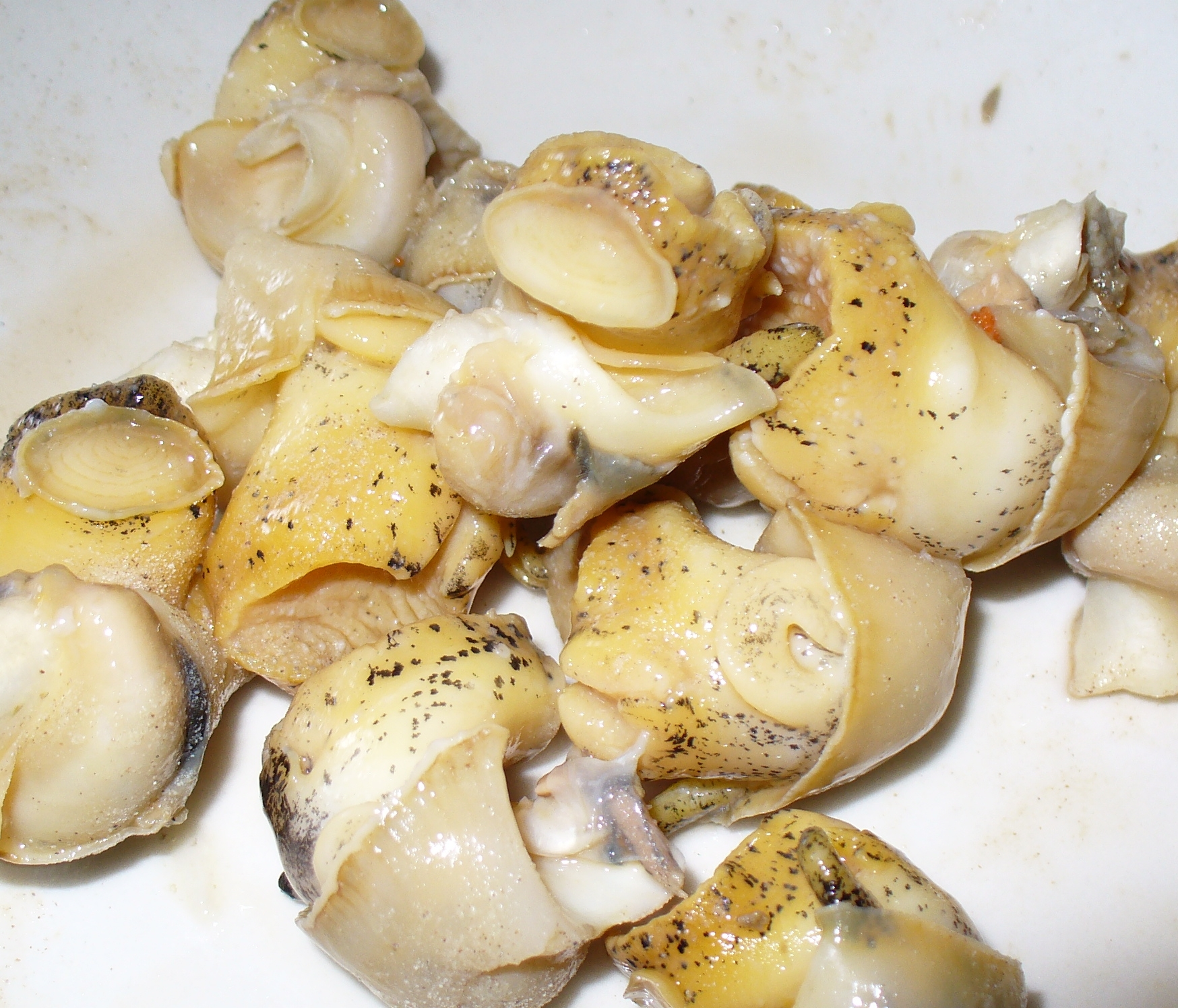
Cooked whelks removed from the shell

Buccinum undatum is eaten widely, sometimes referred to by its French name bulot. A strong fishery exists on many shores around the world. They are trapped in pots using dogfish and brown crab as bait. It can be confused with Neptunea antiqua (red whelk), which is poisonous to humans.

== Ecology and population decline ==
Disappearing or diminishing populations of whelks have been observed since the early 1970s, especially in the North Sea and the Wadden Sea. Additionally, vast beds of empty shells have been discovered where no living whelks are present. Imposex, the occurrence of male gonads on female whelks, has been detected since the early 1990s, and is thought to be a product of the shipping industry. Specifically, TBT has been shown to reduce viability of whelk populations. Common whelk egg cases can be found washed up on the intertidal zone of beaches, and are colloquially known as sea wash balls.
