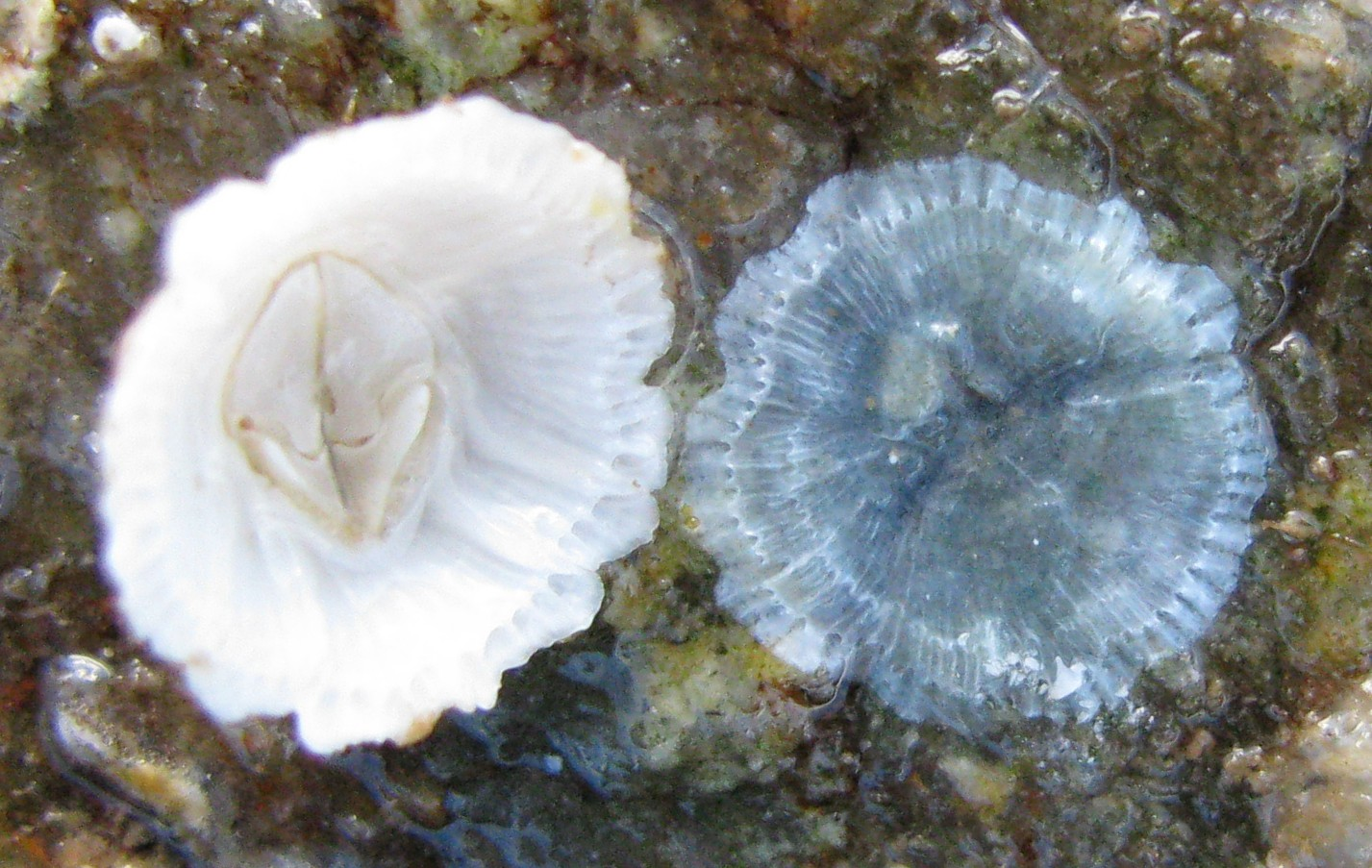

Scientific classification
- Kingdom: Animalia
- Phylum: Arthropoda
- Class: Thecostraca
- Subclass: Cirripedia
- Order: Balanomorpha
- Family: Balanidae
- Genus: Balanus
- Species: B. crenatus

Binomial name
- Balanus crenatus Bruguière, 1789

Subspecies
- B. c. crenatus; B. c. curviscutum; B. c. delicatus

= Balanus crenatus =

Balanus crenatus Temporal range: Pleistocene–Present

Species of barnacle

Balanus crenatus is a species of acorn barnacle in the Balanidae family. It is found in the North Pacific and the North Atlantic Ocean.

== Description ==
The shell of B. crenatus is made of six calcareous plates and grows up to 25 millimetres (0.98 in) across. The upper edge of the plates are toothed and the shell is often tilted to one side. The opercular aperture is diamond shaped and protected by two further plates which can slide across when the animal is not feeding.

== Distribution ==
This is a boreal species distributed in intertidal and sublittoral zones of the North Pacific and the North Atlantic. It has a similar distribution to Balanus balanus, a species with which it is often associated.

== Biology ==
This barnacle is a hermaphrodite and the reproductive organs develop during the winter. Individuals in a group fertilise each other and, after a period of maturation, nauplii are liberated into the water. After a number of moults, the larvae settle out of the zooplankton in about April and attach themselves to rocks and stones on the sea floor. B. crenatus is a fast-growing barnacle and can grow from a length of 3 millimetres (0.12 in) to 9 mm (0.35 in) in the month of May after settling. It is fully grown by August and ready to reproduce in its first winter.

== Ecology ==
This species is mainly found in the sublittoral zone but can sometimes be found under stones or overhangs on the lower shore. It colonises pebbles, bedrock, shells and artificial structures. It is found in both calm and exposed waters and can tolerate low salinity levels and is found at depths of up to 60 metres (200 ft). It seems to favour habitats with strong currents and when overcrowding occurs, may be distorted to fit the space available. It is often found growing alongside another species of barnacle, Balanus balanus.

The main predator is the juvenile common starfish (Asterias rubens). Medium sized barnacles seem to be at greatest risk. Small specimens are ignored while large specimens seem able to withstand attack but in some years, the population is decimated.
