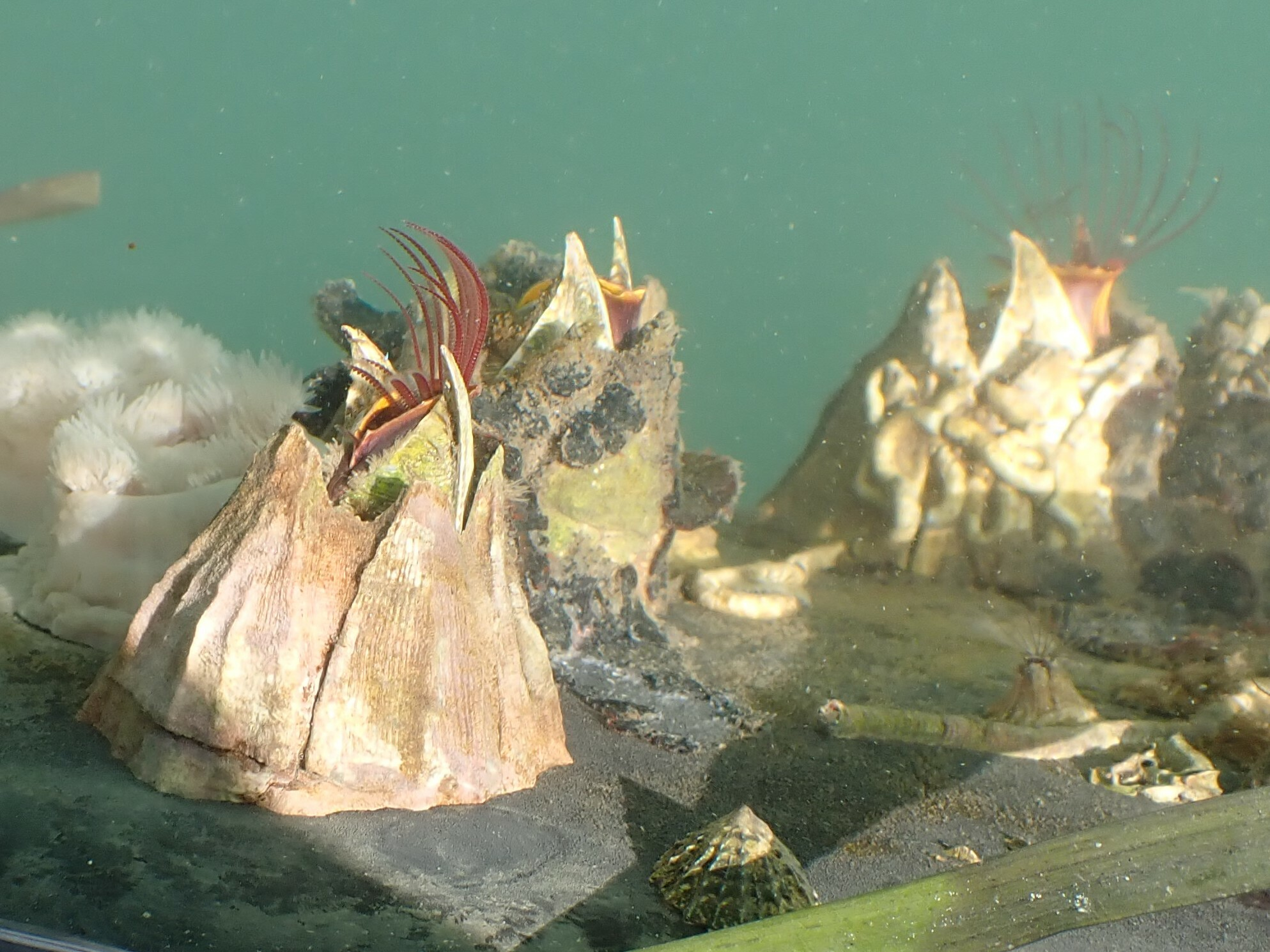
- Giant acorn barnacles with cirri extended for feeding

Scientific classification
- Kingdom: Animalia
- Phylum: Arthropoda
- Class: Thecostraca
- Subclass: Cirripedia
- Order: Balanomorpha
- Family: Balanidae
- Genus: Balanus
- Species: B. nubilus

Binomial name
- Balanus nubilus Darwin, 1854

= Balanus nubilus =

Species of barnacle

Balanus nubilus, commonly called the giant acorn barnacle, is the world's largest barnacle, reaching a diameter of 15 cm (6 in) and a height of up to 30 cm (12 in), and containing the largest known muscle fibres.

== Classification ==
Balanus nubilus was named by Charles Darwin, who described its appearance and noted its habitat. He wrote that the barnacles were found on rotting wood and were associated with Balanus glandula. Darwin said the barnacles were "very distinct" but thought that the species allied with Balanus balanus more closely "than to any other species", and also allied with B. cariosus.

== Ecology ==
Balanus nubilus is a northeast Pacific species that ranges from southern Alaska to Baja California. It is frequently found growing on rocks, pier pilings and hard-shelled animals at depths of up to 90 m (300 ft). Like other acorn barnacles, B. nubilus is a filter feeder; it, in turn, is sometimes eaten by sea otters, sea stars, crabs and the Native Americans of the Pacific Northwest. Abandoned shells of B. nubilus are used by the crab Glebocarcinus oregonensis for shelter.
