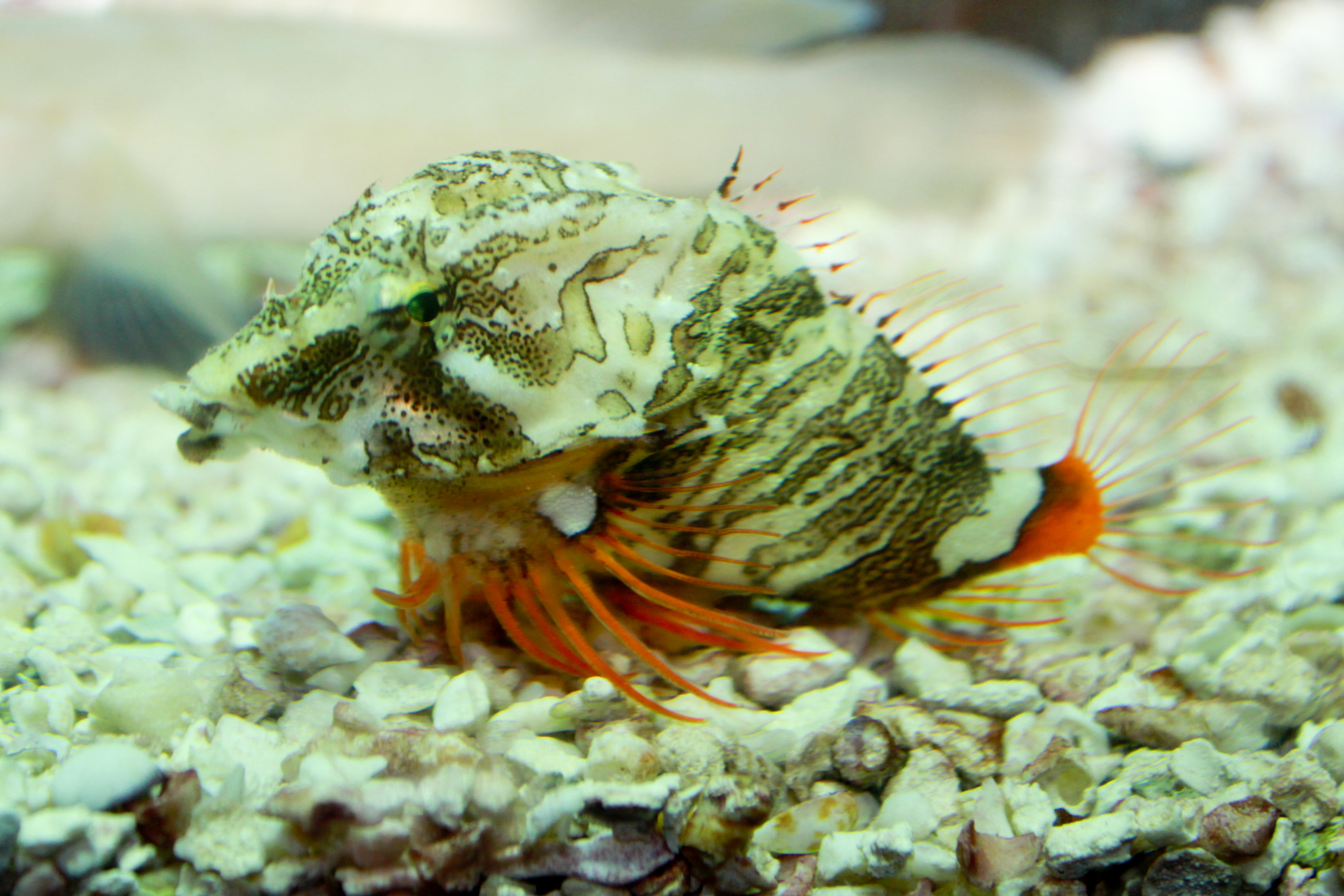
- Grunt sculpin (Rhamphocottus richardsonii)

Scientific classification
- Kingdom: Animalia
- Phylum: Chordata
- Class: Actinopterygii
- Order: Perciformes
- Suborder: Cottoidei
- Superfamily: Cottoidea
- Family: Rhamphocottidae; Jordan & Gilbert, 1883

Genera
- see text

Synonyms
- Ereuniidae Jordan & Snyder 1901

= Rhamphocottidae =

Family of fish

Rhamphocottidae is a family of ray-finned fishes belonging to the superfamily Cottoidea, the sculpins. The species in this family occur in the North Pacific Ocean.

== Taxonomy ==
Rhamphocottidae was first proposed as a family by the American ichthyologists David Starr Jordan and Charles Henry Gilbert in 1883. The family was regarded as monotypic until 2014 when the family Ereunidae was synonymised with it. This family is classified within the superfamily Cottoidea in the suborder Cottoidei in the order Scorpaeniformes in the 5th edition of Fishes of the World but other authorities states that if Scorpaeniformes is excluded from Perciformes then Perciformes is recovered as paraphyletic and so classify this family within the infraorder Cottales within the suborder Cottoidei of the Perciformes. Within the Cottoidea the Ramphocottidae is the sister taxon to all the other groups.

== Genera ==
Rhamphocottidae contains the following genera:

- Ereunias Jordan & Snyder, 1901
- Marukawichthys Sakamoto, 1931
- Rhamphocottus Günther, 1874

== Characteristics ==
Rhamphocottidae sculpins have a single pharyngobranchial bone. In the pectoral fins several of the lower pectoral rays are separated from the upper lobe and are free of the fin membrane. There are fin stays in the dorsal and anal fin. The tail has all parts of the hypural and parhypural fused into a single complex structure. The smallest species is the grunt sculpin (Rhamphocottus richardsonii) with a maximum published total length of 8.9 cm (3.5 in) while the largest is Ereunias grallator which reaches a maximum published total length of 30 cm (12 in).

== Distribution and habitat ==
Rhamphocottidae are found in the North Pacific Ocean where they are found from Japan along the Asian coasts to Alaska and south to California. These are demeral or bathydemersal fishes with the grunt sculpin being a species of intertidal and subtidal regions but they other species being deep water fishes.
