= Marukawichthys =

Scientific classification
- Kingdom: Animalia
- Phylum: Chordata
- Class: Actinopterygii
- Order: Perciformes
- Suborder: Cottoidei
- Family: Rhamphocottidae
- Genus: Marukawichthys; Ki. Sakamoto, 1931

Type species
- Marukawichthys ambulator Sakamoto, 1931

Genus of fishes

Marukawichthys is a small genus of marine ray-finned fishes belonging to the family Rhamphocottidae, the grunt sculpins and deepwater bullhead sculpins. These fishes are found in the northwestern Pacific Ocean near Japan.

== Species ==
There are currently two recognized species in this genus:

- Marukawichthys ambulator Ki. Sakamoto, 1931
- Marukawichthys pacificus Yabe, 1983
