= Gábor Kolosváry =

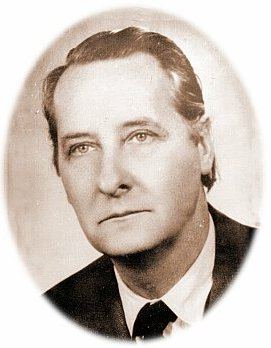

Gábor Kolosváry or Gabriel von Kolosvary (August 18, 1901 – December 23, 1968) was a Hungarian zoologist. He worked at the Hungarian National Museum and was a specialist on the arachnids as well as fossil cirripedes and other crustacea.

Kolosváry was born in the town of Kolozsvar, Transylvania, now known as Cluj-Napoca. His father Balint was a professor of civil law married to Alice Stein. Educated at Cluj for both school and university. He received a doctorate in zoology and geology in 1925. He joined the University of Szeged in 1923 as an assistant and in 1929 he became a keeper at the National Museum, in charge of the spider collections. He also worked on the paleontology collections and in 1954 he became director of the zoology institute of the University of Szeged. He studied the Echinodermata collected by the Hungarian Najade expedition. He took a special interest in the river Tisza and founded the magazine Tiscia in 1955 to cover research on its biology. Kolosváry was involved in the study of the marine fauna of the Adriatic sea and took a special interest in cirripede systematics (particularly the balanomorpha). He also studied madreporian corals. He also conducted experiments on color vision in rodents.

Kolosváry was elected to the hungarian Academy of Sciences in 1960. and was awarded the Bogdanffy Prize in 1965.
