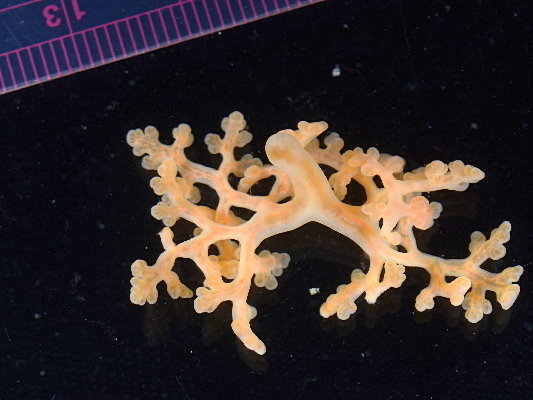
- A member of the Dendrogaster genus

Scientific classification
- Kingdom: Animalia
- Phylum: Arthropoda
- Clade: Pancrustacea
- Class: Thecostraca
- Subclass: Ascothoracida; Lacaze-Duthiers, 1880

Orders and families
- Dendrogastrida Grygier, 1987: Ascothoracidae Grygier, 1987; Ctenosculidae Thiele, 1925; Dendrogastridae Gruvel, 1905; Laurida Grygier, 1987: Lauridae Gruvel, 1905; Petrarcidae Gruvel, 1905; Synagogidae Gruvel, 1905

= Ascothoracida =

Group of crustaceans

Ascothoracida is a small group of parasitic marine crustaceans, comprising around 100 species and divided into Dendrogastrida and Laurida. They are found throughout the world on cnidarians and echinoderms. Dendrogastrida are parasites on echinoderms, and Laurida are parasites on cnidarians, except from the genus Waginella, which is also a parasite on echinoderms (crinoids). Piercing and sucking mouthparts are used for feeding, and more advanced forms also absorb nutrients through a modified integument of the carapace. More basal forms are ectoparasitic, but most genera are meso- and endoparasitic. The sexes are separate, except from secondary hermaphroditic species of the Petrarcidae. In many species the larger female often have smaller males living inside her mantle cavity.

Ascothoracida was previously ranked as an order within the infraclass Cirripedia (barnacles), but now both Ascothoracida and Cirripedia are considered separate subclasses. Those two subclasses, along with Facetotecta, make up the class Thecostraca.

The thorax of Ascothoracida species has six pair of biramous appendages, while the abdomen has four segments and a terminal telson with a caudal furca. This arrangement is similar to that seen in copepods. In addition, there is a bivalved carapace, which is expanded in females.
