= Dendrogaster antarctica =

Scientific classification
- Kingdom: Animalia
- Phylum: Arthropoda
- Class: Thecostraca
- Order: Dendrogastrida
- Family: Dendrogastridae
- Genus: Dendrogaster
- Species: D. antarctica

Binomial name
- Dendrogaster antarctica Grygier (1980)

Species of barnacle

Dendrogaster antarctica is an endoparasitic ascothoracid in the family Dendrogastridae that parasitizes on the common Antarctica cushion star, Odontaster validus. It has been found in several sites in Antarctica and was originally discovered by Mark J. Grygier in 1980. He then released an article in 1987 explaining the characteristics of a female member of the species. It was confirmed as an official species in 2003.

It has extremely small sperm. Their heads are 6–7 μm, long, The midpiece is as long as the head, and tapers to a flagellum 45–50 μm long. This sperm is the most primitive yet found in crustaceans.
