= Raillietiella teagueselfi =

Scientific classification
- Kingdom: Animalia
- Phylum: Arthropoda
- Clade: Pancrustacea
- Class: Ichthyostraca
- Order: Raillietiellida
- Family: Raillietiellidae
- Genus: Raillietiella
- Species: R. teagueselfi

Binomial name
- Raillietiella teagueselfi Riley, McAllister & Freed, 1988

Species of crustacean

Raillietiella teagueselfi is a species of parasitic crustacean. Raillietiella in general are found in tropical and sub-tropical regions and adults affect the lungs of reptiles and amphibians.

== Taxonomy ==
The species was discovered in Houston, Texas in 1987 by the parasitologist John Riley and his colleagues as they investigated rapid population increase of the host species Hemidactylus turcicus, a Mediterranean gecko, and found an abundance of an unknown species of pentastomids in the lungs. The species was named after Dr. John Teague Self, a zoologist from the University of Oklahoma, for his contributions on Pentastomida.

== Description ==
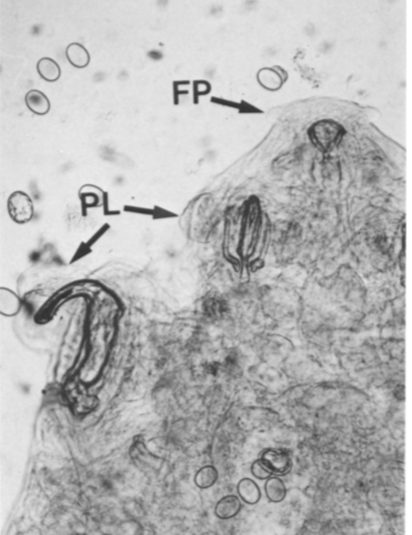
Cephalothorax of a female with a cone- shaped mouth and hooks.

Females have a genital pore on their anterior ends, as well as pointed hooks. They also have hooks on their posterior ends but they are larger and have rounded tips instead of pointed tips. During the dissection, they examined some eggs within the female, and contained larvae with hooks that were fully developed.

Mature males have hooks with blunt tips on their posterior ends. Its body is wider on the upper half of its body and has an annulated abdomen. They also contain hooked copulatory spicules that aid in mating.

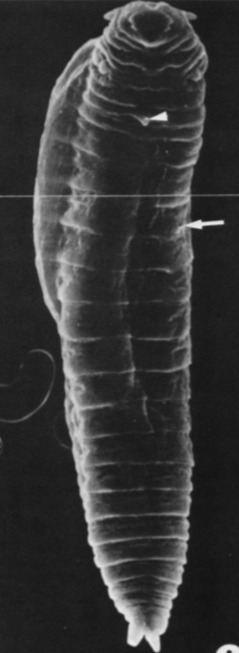
Male anatomy

== Behaviour and ecology ==
=== Life cycle ===
Raillietiella teagueselfi belongs to a group of pentastomids that have an indirect life cycle and usually have hosts that are vertebrates. Species in this subclass generally have reptiles as their definitive host. The adult stage of pentastomids are found in the lungs. Once the eggs of the parasite are in the lungs, then they are coughed up, then swallowed back into the host and end in their feces. Once the eggs are fertilized, the formation of an embryo or embryogenesis lasts about 3–4 weeks. Afterwards, the fully developed larva waits for an intermediate host. Then after 4 weeks, it enters the intermediate host. After being in the host for 6–8 weeks, the larvae are now infectious and go into the definitive host and stay there for 8–10 weeks, which then become adults. After approximately 14–18 weeks, the larvae reaches sexual maturity.

=== Transmission ===
Due to the intensity of infection in this species, it is believed that this parasite adapted to an insect as an intermediate host, but since they only found the parasite in this one specific site, they are still unsure on the transmission of it and its factors.
