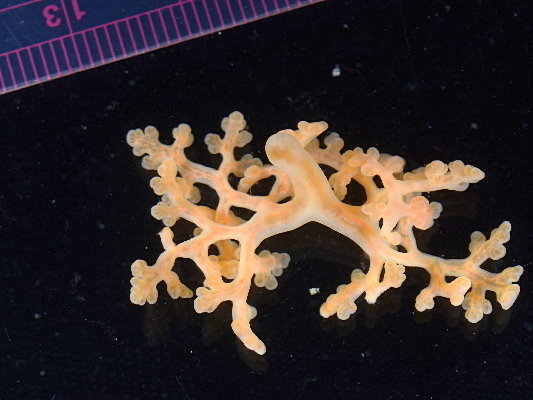

Scientific classification
- Kingdom: Animalia
- Phylum: Arthropoda
- Clade: Pancrustacea
- Class: Thecostraca
- Order: Dendrogastrida
- Family: Dendrogastridae
- Genus: Dendrogaster; Knipovich, 1890

Species
- (See text)

= Dendrogaster =

Genus of crustaceans

Dendrogaster is a genus of endoparasitic crustaceans belonging to the family Dendrogastridae. Its habitat depth varies widely, ranging from the intertidal zone to approximately 2,500 m.

The genus has cosmopolitan distribution. They parasitize the coelom of asteroids (sea stars). At present, Dendrogaster have been discovered in eighteen families of sea stars, implying a non-specific host preference.

== Species ==
- D. adhaerens
- D. antarctica Grygier, 1980
- D. arborescens Le Roi, 1905
- D. arbusculus Fisher, 1911
- D. arctica
- D. argentinensis
- D. astericola
- D. asterinae
- D. astropectinis
- D. beringensis
- D. danni
- D. deformator
- D. dichotoma
- D. dogieli
- D. elegans
- D. fisheri
- D. hymenasteri
- D. iwanowi
- D. jinshomaruae
- D. komatsuae Saito, Wakabayashi & Moritaki, 2020
- D. leptasteriae
- D. ludwigi
- D. murmanensis
- D. nagasakimaruae Saito, Wakabayashi & Moritaki, 2020
- D. nike
- D. okadai
- D. orientalis
- D. otagoensis
- D. punctata
- D. tobasuii Saito, Wakabayashi & Moritaki, 2020
- D. usarporum
