= Lepidurus cryptus =

Conservation status
- Vulnerable (NatureServe)

Scientific classification
- Kingdom: Animalia
- Phylum: Arthropoda
- Class: Branchiopoda
- Order: Notostraca
- Family: Triopsidae
- Genus: Lepidurus
- Species: L. cryptus

Binomial name
- Lepidurus cryptus Rogers, 2001

Species of Crustacean

Lepidurus cryptus, or the cryptic tadpole shrimp, is a relatively small species of freshwater crustacean endemic to California and Oregon. The name "cryptus" is derived from its role as a cryptic species, being visually indistinguishable from Lepidurus packardi. Though its range is large, it remains uncommon, and is considered a vulnerable species by NatureServe. It lives in temporary pools of water throughout its range, which may be filled with aquatic plants.

== Taxonomy ==
Lepidurus cryptus was originally discovered in 1998, though it was thought to be a separate population of Lepidurus couesii. In 2001, D. Christopher Rogers described the animal as its own species based on both field and museum specimens. The type locality, or where the species was originally found, is Poison Lake in Lassen County, California.

The name "cryptus" is based on the Latin word for "cryptic", as this species is a cryptic species of Lepidurus packardi, meaning the two cannot be distinguished by their physical appearance. Instead, this species is distinguished by its DNA.

The holotype (primary specimen used to describe the species) is a female, and was collected from the type locality in 1998. This specimen, along with several paratypes, are located at the Bohart Museum of Entomology at the University of California, Davis. Other paratypes are located in the collections of the Smithsonian and the California Academy of Sciences, respectively.

== Distribution ==
Lepidurus cryptus may be found anywhere in the Great Basin regions of northern California, with its range extending into southern and eastern Oregon. In California, specific occurrences have been recorded in Plumas, Lassen, Shasta, and Siskiyou County. In Oregon, the species has been observed in Lake, Harney, and Klamath County. Some specimens were found within 0.5 mi (0.80 km) of the California/Nevada border, though no occurrences within the state of Nevada have been recorded. One source records the species as far north as the states of Washington and Idaho. Though its range is large, the species remains uncommon.

== Description ==
Lepidurus cryptus grows to a length of about 15 to 60 mm (0.59 to 2.36 in) as adults, measured from the tip of the carapace (body shell) to the tip of the caudal lamina. Its color is highly variable, and can be a very translucent yellow, light or dark green, light or dark brown, and even black, with additional mottling found in many more colors. Like other Lepidurus species, L. cryptus has between 24 and 29 body rings and 30–35 pairs of legs. These legs have at least 5 inward-facing projections called endites, the last 3 of which extend past the edge of the carapace. A line that runs between the tops of the eyes is intersected by the nuchal organ, a light-sensitive organ that is formed from the embryonic (naupliar) eye. The posterior end of the carapace, called the sulcus, is covered in triangular spines. As adults, these spines are about the same relative length and width. However, smaller individuals may have spines that are 1.2–1.5 times as long as they are wide, and old individuals may have rounded spines instead. Each spine is separated by a gap of about 2 spine lengths. Each gap contains many smaller spines that have a more variable shape. The presence of these smaller spines distinguish the species from its relative Lepidurus couesii. The caudal lamina (supra-anal plate), a structure at the base of the tail, is truncate and is between 0.1 and 0.3 times the length of the carapace.

This species is indistinguishable from Lepidurus packardi based on its visible features alone, and was originally described based on DNA sequences and allozyme analyses.

== Ecology and habitat ==
Lepidurus cryptus lives in temporary pools of fresh water, including vernal pools. The water which it inhabits may range in pH from slightly acidic to slightly basic. The species was originally described from Poison Lake in California at an elevation of 1.53 km (0.95 mi). This lake is temporary, only containing water from November to August, and is also highly vegetated, especially with the genus Eleocharis.

This species shares its habitat with several other species, including the crustaceans Streptocephalus sealii, Eubranchipus serratus, Branchinecta coloradensis, Lynceus brachyrurus, along with copepods, ostracods, and cladocerans. Salamanders and predaceous diving beetles have been observed to bite off parts of the legs of this species.
