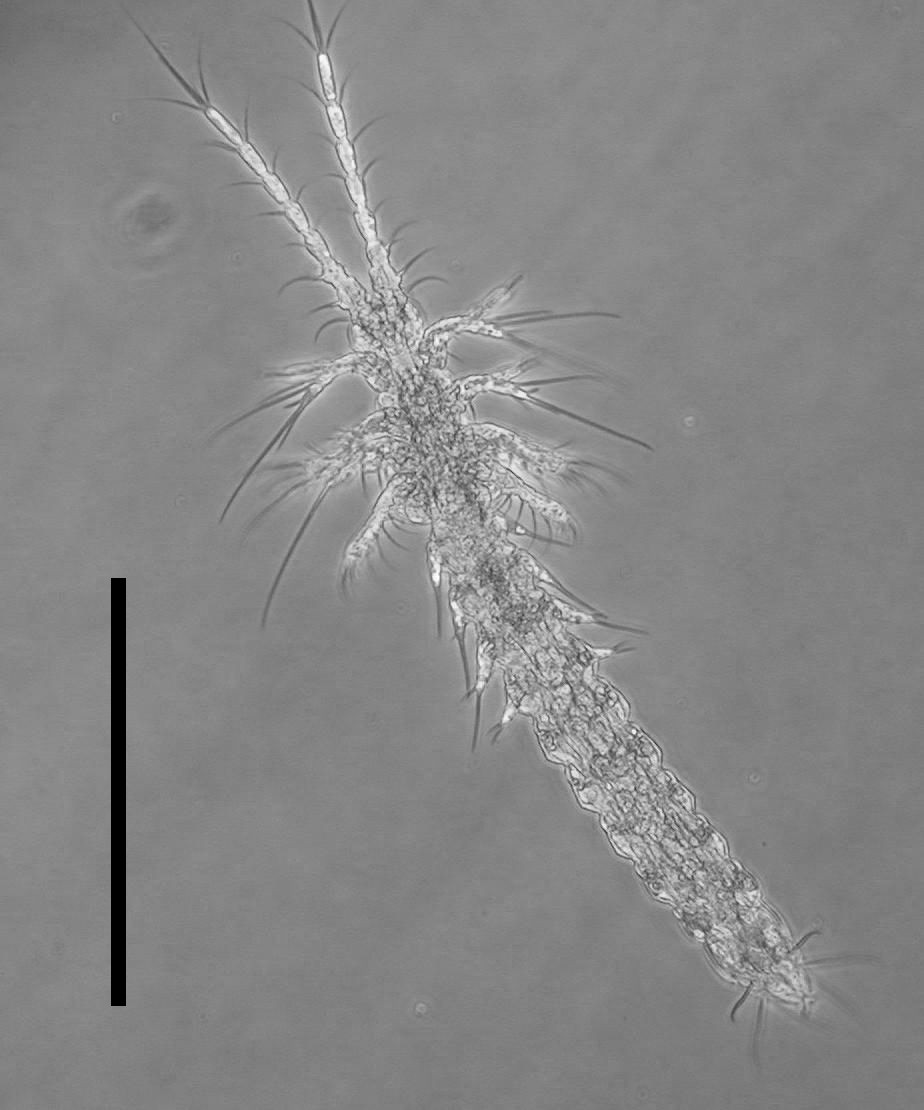

Scientific classification
- Kingdom: Animalia
- Phylum: Arthropoda
- Order: Mystacocaridida
- Family: Derocheilocarididae
- Genus: Ctenocheilocaris
- Species: C. galvarini

Binomial name
- Ctenocheilocaris galvarini (Dahl, 1952)

= Ctenocheilocaris galvarini =

Species of crustacean

Ctenocheilocaris galvarini is a species of marine crustacean found in the intertidal zones on the Chilean coast. It is part of the family Derocheilocarididae.
