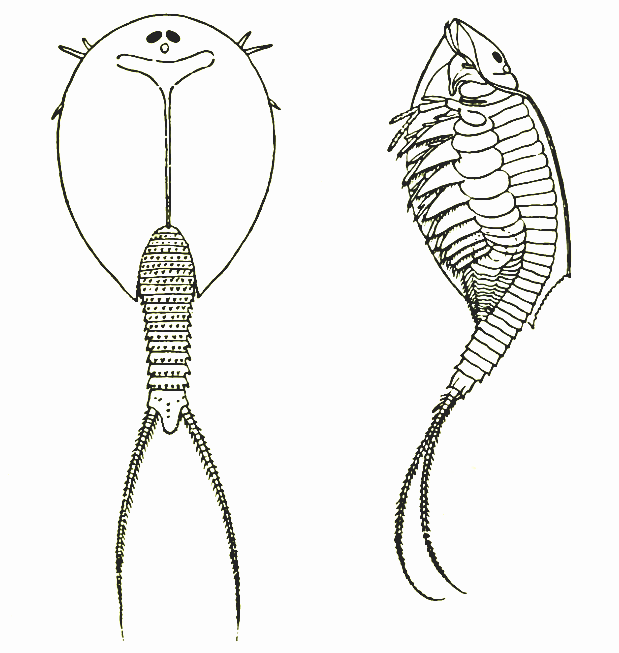
- Lepidurus arcticus

Scientific classification
- Kingdom: Animalia
- Phylum: Arthropoda
- Clade: Pancrustacea
- Class: Branchiopoda
- Order: Notostraca
- Family: Triopsidae
- Genus: Lepidurus; Leach, 1819

Species
- See text

Synonyms
- Bilobus Sidirov, 1924; junior subjective synonym

= Lepidurus =

Lepidurus Temporal range: Early Jurassic–Present

Genus of tadpole shrimp

Lepidurus is a genus of small crustaceans in the order Notostraca (tadpole shrimp). It is the larger of the two extant genera of the tadpole shrimps, the other being Triops. They are commonly found in vernal pools and survive dry periods with the help of long lasting resting eggs.

== Species ==
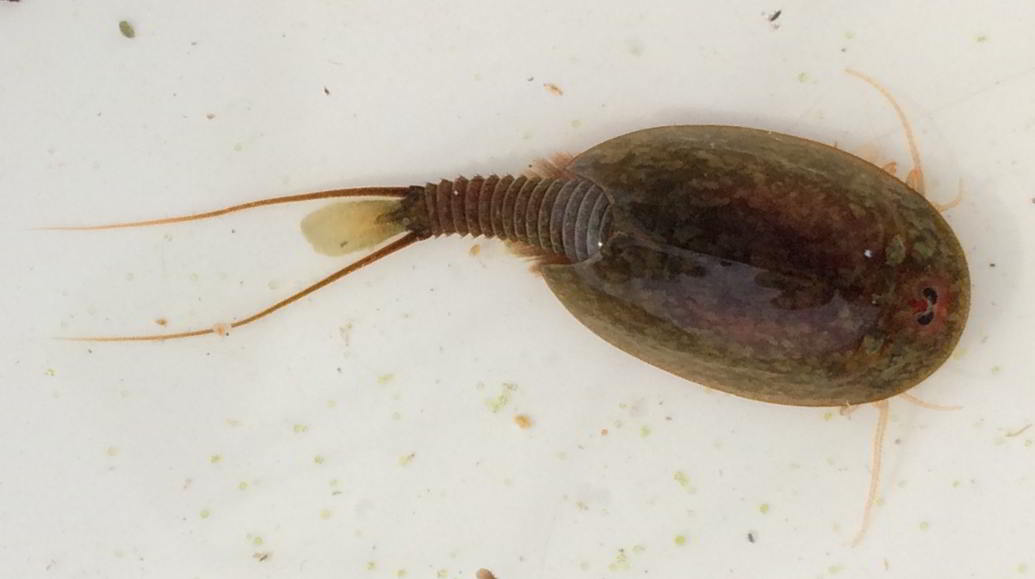
Adult freshwater crustacean of the genus Lepidurus.

The genus contains the following species:

- Lepidurus apus (Linnaeus, 1758)
- Lepidurus arcticus (Pallas, 1793)
- Lepidurus batesoni Longhurst, 1955
- Lepidurus bilobatus Packard, 1883
- Lepidurus couesii Packard, 1875 [*Note]
- Lepidurus cryptus Rogers, 2001
- Lepidurus lemmoni Holmes, 1894
- Lepidurus lubbocki Brauer, 1873
- Lepidurus mongolicus Vekhoff, 1992
- Lepidurus packardi Simon, 1886
- Lepidurus patagonicus Berg, 1900
- Lepidurus viridis Baird, 1850

[*Note: Contra "couessii" as unavailable subsequent spelling in some databases]

=== Species brought into synonymy ===
All listed synonyms are junior subjective synonyms.

- Lepidurus angasi Baird, 1866; accepted as Lepidurus apus Linnaeus, 1758
- Lepidurus barcaeus Ghigi, 1921; accepted as Lepidurus apus Linnaeus, 1758
- Lepidurus compressus Thompson, 1879; accepted as Lepidurus apus Linnaeus, 1758
- Lepidurus glacialis Packard, 1883; accepted as Lepidurus arcticus Pallas, 1793
- Lepidurus hatcheri Ortmann, 1911; accepted as Lepidurus apus Linnaeus, 1758
- Lepidurus kirki Thompson, 1879; accepted as Lepidurus apus Linnaeus, 1758
- Lepidurus lynchi Linder, 1952; accepted as Lepidurus lemmoni Holmes, 1894 fide Rogers, 2001
- Lepidurus macrourus Ghigi, 1921; accepted as Lepidurus apus Linnaeus, 1758
- Lepidurus productus Leach, 1819; accepted as Lepidurus apus Linnaeus, 1758
- Lepidurus spitzbergensis Bernard, 1892; accepted as Lepidurus arcticus Pallas, 1793
- Lepidurus ussuriensis Sidorov, 1927; accepted as Lepidurus arcticus Pallas, 1793
- Lepidurus viridulus Tate, 1879; accepted as Lepidurus apus Linnaeus, 1758
