= Ctenocheilocaris =

Scientific classification
- Domain: Eukaryota
- Kingdom: Animalia
- Phylum: Arthropoda
- Order: Mystacocaridida
- Family: Derocheilocarididae
- Genus: Ctenocheilocaris; Renaud-Mornant, 1976

Genus of crustaceans

Ctenocheilocaris is a genus of marine crustacean. It is part of the family Derocheilocarididae and contains five species:

- Ctenocheilocaris armata
- Ctenocheilocaris claudiae
- Ctenocheilocaris enochra
- Ctenocheilocaris galvarini
- Ctenocheilocaris minor
