= Gorgonolaureus =

Gorgonolaureus muzikae

Scientific classification
- Domain: Eukaryota
- Kingdom: Animalia
- Phylum: Arthropoda
- Class: Thecostraca
- Order: Laurida
- Family: Synagogidae
- Genus: Gorgonolaureus
- Species: G. muzikae

Binomial name
- Gorgonolaureus muzikae Grygier, 1981

Species of crustacean

Gorgonolaureus is a monotypic genus of crustacean with only one species, Gorgonolaureus muzikae.
