= Laura (crustacean) =

Scientific classification
- Domain: Eukaryota
- Kingdom: Animalia
- Phylum: Arthropoda
- Class: Thecostraca
- Order: Laurida
- Family: Lauridae
- Genus: Laura; Lacaze-Duthiers, 1865

Genus of crustaceans

Laura is a genus of crustacean with two species: Laura bicornuta and Laura dorsalis. It is in the family Lauridae.
