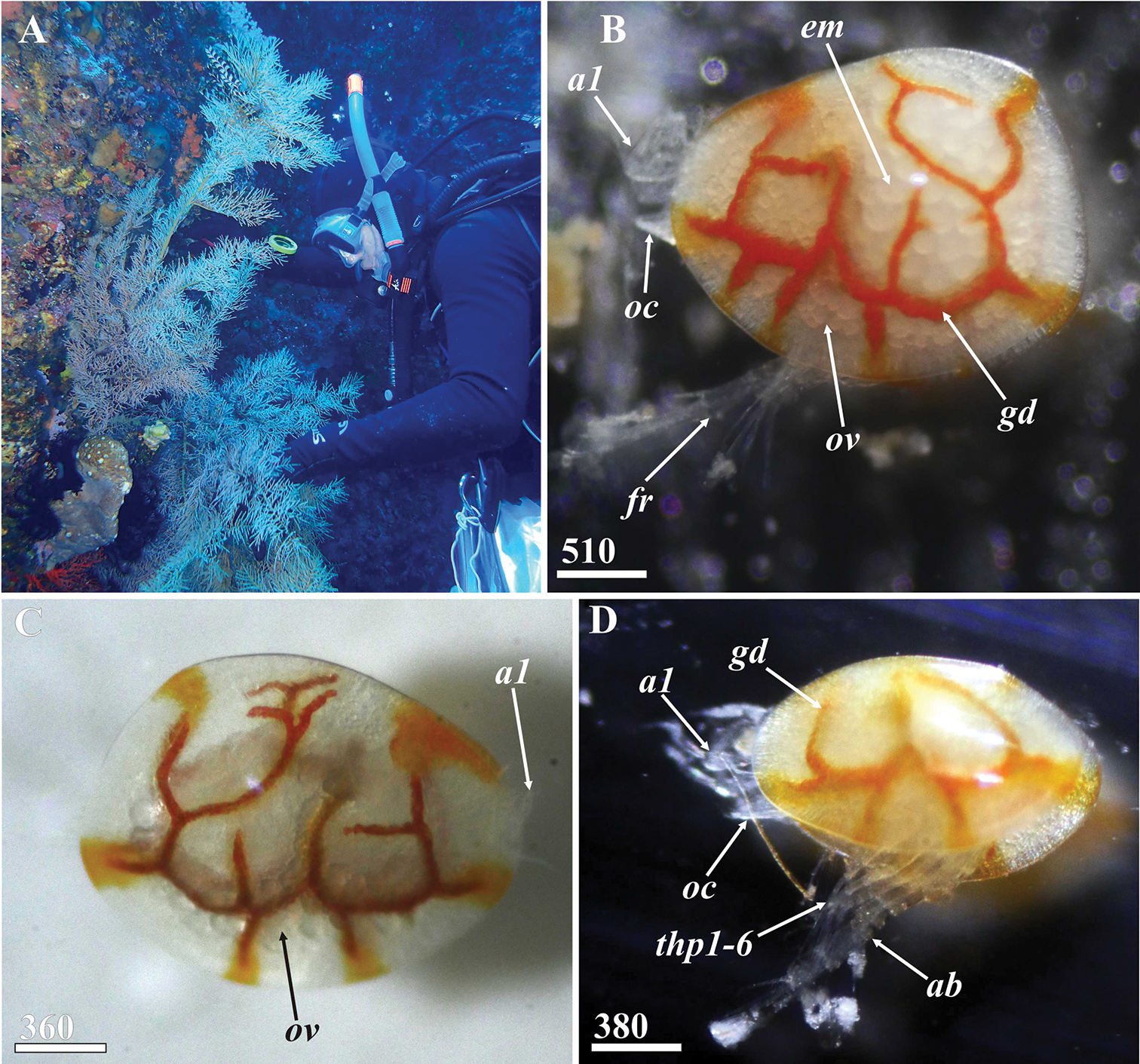
- Synagoga arabesque

Scientific classification
- Domain: Eukaryota
- Kingdom: Animalia
- Phylum: Arthropoda
- Class: Thecostraca
- Order: Laurida
- Family: Synagogidae

= Synagogidae =

Family of crustaceans

Synagogidae is a family of crustaceans belonging to the order Laurida.

Genera:

- Cardomanica Lowry, 1985
- Flatsia Grygier, 1991
- Gorgonolaureus Utinomi, 1962
- Isidascus Moyse, 1983
- Parasothorax Wagin, 1964
- Sessilogoga Grygier, 1990
- Synagoga Norman, 1888
- Thalassomembracis Grygier, 1984
- Waginella Grygier, 1983
