= Ascothoracidae =

Scientific classification
- Domain: Eukaryota
- Kingdom: Animalia
- Phylum: Arthropoda
- Class: Thecostraca
- Order: Dendrogastrida
- Family: Ascothoracidae; Grygier, 1987

Family of crustaceans

Ascothoracidae is a family of crustaceans belonging to the order Dendrogastrida.

Genera:

- Ascothorax Djakonov, 1914
- Cardiosaccus Kolbasov & Petrunina, 2018
