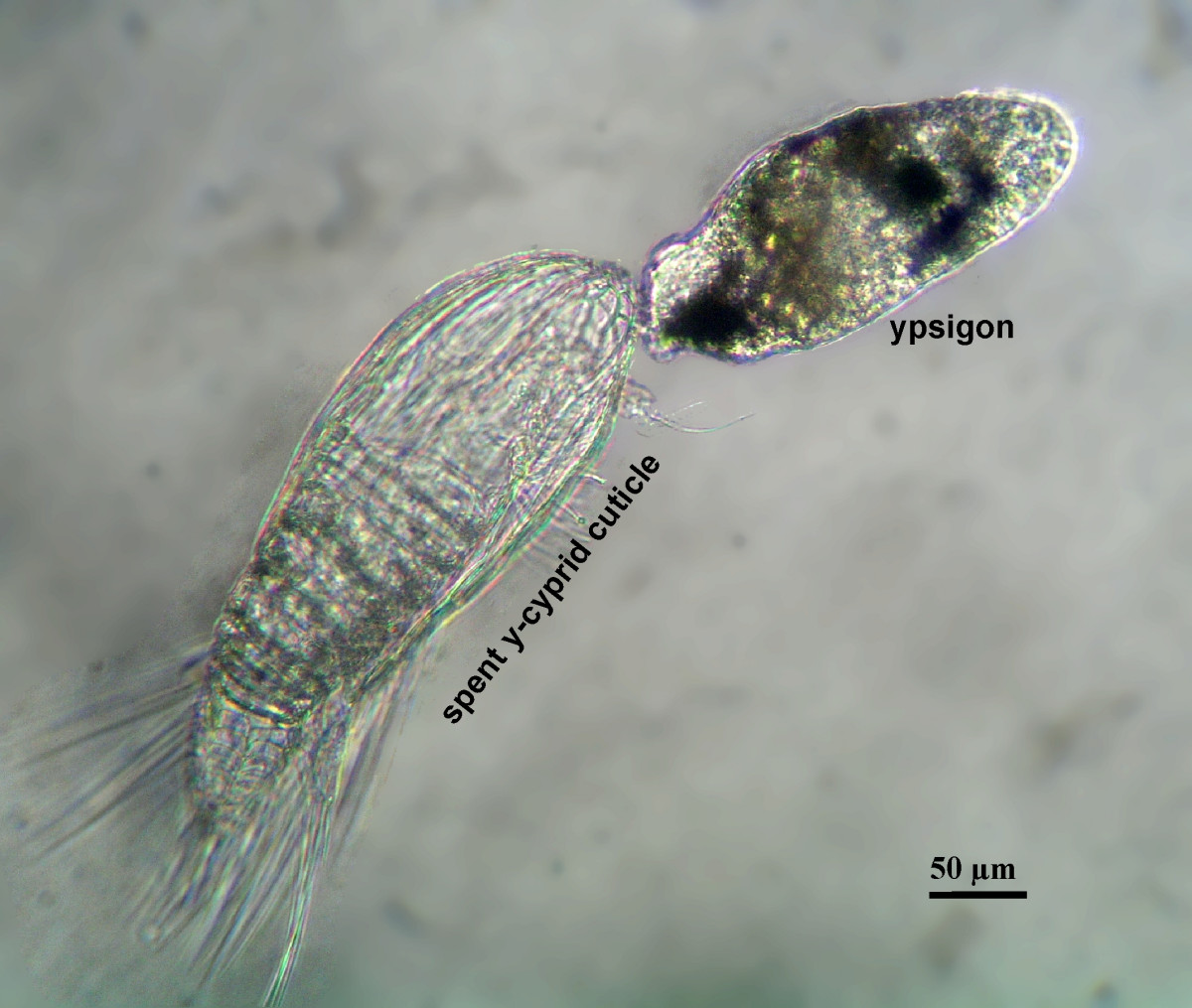
- A Y-psigon escaping from its y-cyprid

Scientific classification
- Kingdom: Animalia
- Phylum: Arthropoda
- Clade: Pancrustacea
- Class: Thecostraca
- Subclass: Facetotecta; Grygier, 1985
- Family: Hansenocarididae; Itô, 1985
- Genus: Hansenocaris; Itô, 1985

Species
- See text

= Facetotecta =

Genus of crustaceans

Facetotecta is a poorly known subclass of thecostracan crustaceans. The adult forms have never been recognized, and the group is known only from its larvae, the "y-nauplius" and "y-cyprid" larvae. The only known genus is Hansenocaris in the family Hansenocarididae. They are mostly found in the north Atlantic Ocean, neritic waters around Japan, and the Mediterranean Basin, where they also survive in brackish water. The adults are probably endoparasites of unknown hosts.

== History ==
The German zoologist Christian Andreas Victor Hensen first collected facetotectans from the North Sea in 1887 but assigned them to the copepod family Corycaeidae; later Hans Jacob Hansen named them "y-nauplia", assuming them to be the larvae of unidentified barnacles. More recently, it has been suggested that, since there is a potential gap in the tantulocarid life cycle, y-larvae may be the larvae of tantulocarids. However, this would be "a very tight fit", and it is more likely that the adult forms have not yet been seen. Genetic analysis using 18S ribosomal DNA reveal Facetotecta to be the sister group to the remaining Thecostraca (Ascothoracida and Cirripedia).

== Life cycle ==
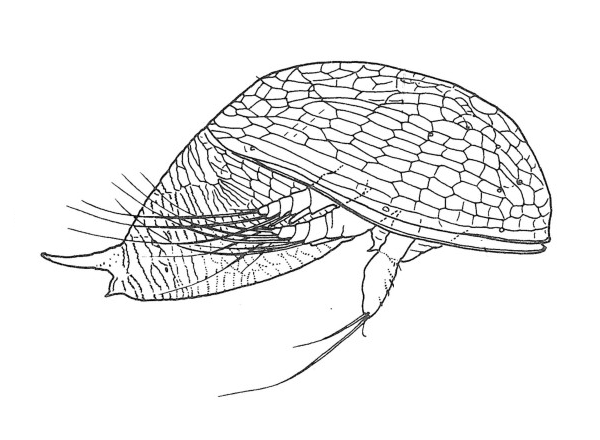
Y-nauplius illustration

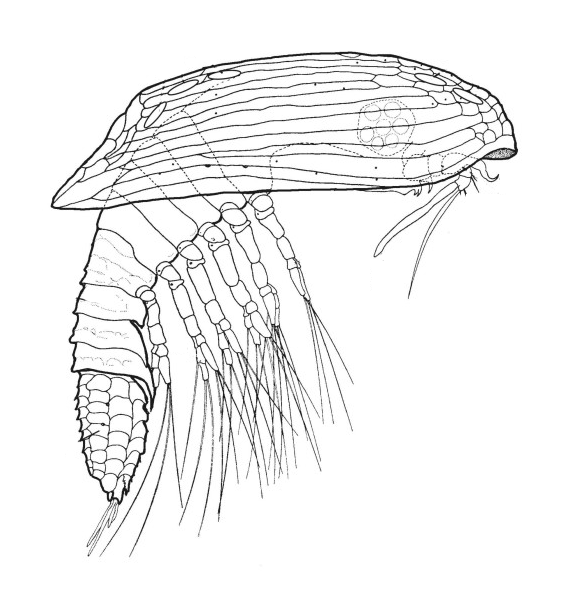
Y-cyprid illustration

The known larval stages of facetotectans closely resemble those of parasitic rhizocephalan barnacles, though this is thought to be an example of convergent evolution rather than a common origin.

=== Nauplius ===
Y-nauplii are 250–620 micrometres (0.010–0.024 in) long, with a faceted cephalic shield, from which the group derives its name. The abdomen is relatively long, and also ornamented. In common with other thecostracans, Facetotecta pass through five naupliar instars before undergoing a single cyprid phase.

=== Cyprid ===
The presence of a distinctive cyprid larva indicates that the Facetotecta is a member of the Thecostraca. A number of species have been described on the basis of a y-cyprid alone. As in barnacles, the cyprid is adapted to seeking a place to settle as an adult. It has compound eyes, can walk using its antennae, and is capable of producing an adhesive glue.

=== Juvenile ===
In 2008, a juvenile form was artificially produced by treating y-larvae with the hormone 20-hydroxyecdysone, which stimulated ecdysis and the transition to a new life phase. The resulting animal, named the y-psigon, was slug-like, apparently unsegmented, and limbless.

=== Adults ===
While they have never been seen, the adult facetotectans are hypothesised to be endoparasites of unknown host animals, some of which could be inhabitants of coral reefs.

== Species ==
Eleven species are currently recognised, while one species which is assigned to Hansenocaris – H. hanseni (Steuer, 1905) – is of uncertain affinities:

- Hansenocaris acutifrons Itô, 1985
- Hansenocaris corvinae Belmonte, 2005
- Hansenocaris furcifera Itô, 1989
- Hansenocaris itoi Kolbasov & Høeg, 2003
- Hansenocaris leucadea Belmonte, 2005
- Hansenocaris mediterranea Belmonte, 2005
- Hansenocaris pacifica Itô, 1985
- Hansenocaris papillata Kolbasov & Grygier, 2007
- Hansenocaris rostrata Itô, 1985
- Hansenocaris salentina Belmonte, 2005
- Hansenocaris tentaculata Itô, 1986
