= Lauridae =

Scientific classification
- Domain: Eukaryota
- Kingdom: Animalia
- Phylum: Arthropoda
- Class: Thecostraca
- Order: Laurida
- Family: Lauridae

Family of crustaceans

Lauridae is a family of crustaceans belonging to the order Laurida.

Genera:

- Baccalaureus Broch, 1929
- Gorganolaureus Utinomi, 1962
- Laura Lacaze-Duthiers, 1865
- Polymarsypus Grygier, 1985
- Zoanthoecus Grygier, 1985
