= Raillietiella =

Scientific classification
- Kingdom: Animalia
- Phylum: Arthropoda
- Clade: Pancrustacea
- Class: Ichthyostraca
- Order: Raillietiellida
- Family: Raillietiellidae
- Genus: Raillietiella; Sambon, 1910

Genus of pentastomids

Raillietiella is a genus of pentastomids in the family Raillietiellidae. It contains 42 species.

== Species ==
Raillietiella contains the following species:

- Raillietiella aegypti Ali, Riley & Self, 1982
- Raillietiella affinis Bovien, 1927
- Raillietiella agcoi Tubangui & Masiluñgan, 1936
- Raillietiella ampanihyensis Gretillat, Brygoo & Domergue, 1962
- Raillietiella amphiboluri Mahon, 1954
- Raillietiella belohaensis McAllister, Riley, Freed & Freed, 1993
- Raillietiella bicaudata Heymons & Vitzthum, 1935
- Raillietiella bifurcaudata Lakshmipyari & Gambhir, 2012
- Raillietiella boulengeri (Vaney & Sambon, 1910)
- Raillietiella bufonis Ali, Riley & Self, 1982
- Raillietiella cartagenensis Ali, Riley & Self, 1985
- Raillietiella chamaeleonis Gretillat & Brygoo, 1959
- Raillietiella colubrilineati (Leuckart, 1860)
- Raillietiella congolensis Fain, 1961
- Raillietiella crotali Ali, Riley & Self, 1984
- Raillietiella freitasi (Motta & Gomes, 1968)
- Raillietiella furcocercum (Diesing, 1836)
- Raillietiella gehyrae Bovien, 1927
- Raillietiella gigliolii Hett, 1924
- Raillietiella gowrii Rajalu & Rajendran, 1970
- Raillietiella hemidactyli Hett, 1934
- Raillietiella indica Gedoelst, 1921
- Raillietiella kochi Heymons, 1926
- Raillietiella mabuiae Heymons, 1922
- Raillietiella maculatus Rao & Hiregaudar, 1962
- Raillietiella maculilabris Ali, Riley & Self, 1984
- Raillietiella madagascariensis McAllister, Riley, Freed & Freed, 1993
- Raillietiella mediterranea (Hett, 1915)
- Raillietiella monarchus Ali, Riley & Self, 1984
- Raillietiella morenoi Abreu-Acosta, Foronda Rodriguez, Valladares & Casanova, 2006
- Raillietiella mottae Almeida, Freire & Lopes, 2008
- Raillietiella namibiensis Riley & Heideman, 1998
- Raillietiella orientalis (Hett, 1915)
- Raillietiella piscator Nair, 1967
- Raillietiella rileyi Krishnasamy, Jeffery, Inder Singh & Oothuman, 1995
- Raillietiella schoutedeni Fain, 1960
- Raillietiella scincoides Ali, Riley & Self, 1984
- Raillietiella spiralis Hett, 1924
- Raillietiella teagueselfi Riley, McAllister & Freed, 1988
- Raillietiella tetrapoda (Gretillat, Brygoo & Domergue, 1962)
- Raillietiella trachea Riley, Oaks & Gilbert, 2003
- Raillietiella venteli (Motta, 1965)
