= Ctenosculidae =

Scientific classification
- Domain: Eukaryota
- Kingdom: Animalia
- Phylum: Arthropoda
- Class: Thecostraca
- Order: Dendrogastrida
- Family: Ctenosculidae

Family of crustaceans

Ctenosculidae is a family of crustaceans belonging to the order Dendrogastrida.

Genera:

- Ctenosculum Heath, 1910
- Endaster Grygier, 1985
- Gongylophysema Grygier, 1987
