= Laurida =

Scientific classification
- Kingdom: Animalia
- Phylum: Arthropoda
- Class: Thecostraca
- Subclass: Ascothoracida
- Order: Laurida; Grygier, 1987

Order of crustaceans

Laurida is an order of crustacean in the infraclass Ascothoracida. It consists of the following families and genera:

- Lauridae Gruvel, 1905
  - Baccalaureus Broch, 1929
  - Laura Lacaze-Duthiers, 1865
  - Polymarsypus Grygier, 1985
  - Zoanthoecus Grygier, 1985
- Petrarcidae Gruvel, 1905
  - Introcornia Grygier, 1983
  - Petrarca G. H. Fowler, 1889
  - Zibrowia Grygier, 1985
- Synagogidae Gruvel, 1905
  - Cardomanica Lowry, 1985
  - Flatsia Grygier, 1991
  - Gorgonolaureus Utinomi, 1962
  - Isidascus Moyse, 1983
  - Sesillogoga Grygier, 1990
  - Synagoga Norman, 1888
  - Thalassomembracis Grygier, 1984
  - Waginella Grygier, 1983
