= Petrarcidae =

Scientific classification
- Domain: Eukaryota
- Kingdom: Animalia
- Phylum: Arthropoda
- Class: Thecostraca
- Order: Laurida
- Family: Petrarcidae

Family of crustaceans

Petrarcidae is a family of crustaceans belonging to the order Laurida.

Genera:

- Introcornia Grygier, 1983
- Petrarca Fowler, 1889
- Zibrowia Grygier, 1985
