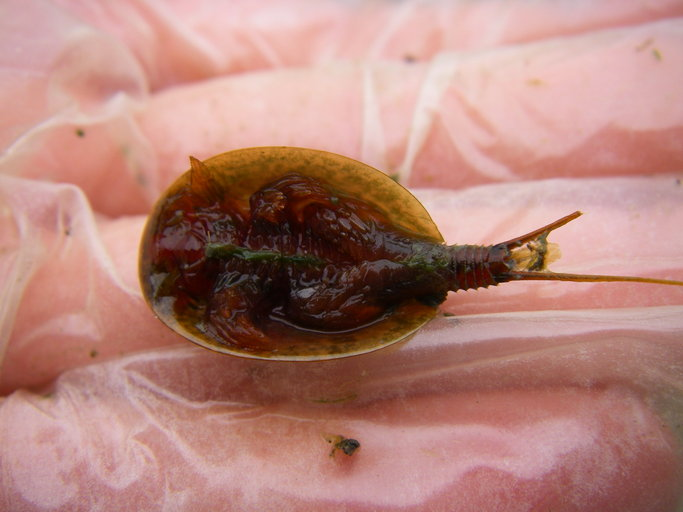

Conservation status
- Endangered (IUCN 2.3)

- Endangered (ESA)

Scientific classification
- Kingdom: Animalia
- Phylum: Arthropoda
- Class: Branchiopoda
- Order: Notostraca
- Family: Triopsidae
- Genus: Lepidurus
- Species: L. packardi

Binomial name
- Lepidurus packardi Simon, 1886
- Lepidurus packardi current range, estimated with the iNaturalist Geomodel, 2025

= Lepidurus packardi =

Species of small freshwater animal

Lepidurus packardi, the vernal pool tadpole shrimp, is a small, rare species of tadpole shrimp (Notostraca) found in temporary ponds of the western United States.

== Distribution ==
The freshwater crustacean is endemic to California, where it lives in the endangered vernal pool type of habitat, and other freshwater aquatic habitats including ponds, reservoirs, ditches, road ruts, and other natural and artificial temporary water bodies.

The animal is found in several regions of California, including the Central Coast, Sacramento Valley, San Joaquin Valley, and southern Sierra Nevada foothills.

The southeastern Sacramento Valley contains about 15% of the remaining vernal pool grassland habitat in the state, and it has about 35% of the known occurrences of L. packardi. 28% of all occurrences are in Sacramento County, California. Other areas with occurrences include the Don Edwards San Francisco Bay National Wildlife Refuge, several preserves in Tehama County, and the vicinity of the cities of Chico, Redding, and Red Bluff. It has been noted at the Sacramento National Wildlife Refuge, Travis Air Force Base, and the Jepson Prairie Preserve. In the San Joaquin Valley it has been noted at the Merced and San Luis National Wildlife Refuges. There are occurrences in the Sierra foothills region in Tulare, Fresno, Merced, and Stanislaus Counties. It occurs outside California in the Agate Desert of Oregon.

== Description ==
Lepidurus packardi is about 5 centimeters (2.0 in) long. It has a shield-like carapace up to 3.5 cm (1.4 in) long. It has compound eyes, up to 48 pairs of phyllopods (swimming appendages), and two cercopods, pincer-like appendages at the end of its telson, or tail segment. It is similar to, but distinct from, the related species Lepidurus couesii. The sexes can be distinguished by noting the egg sacs attached to the eleventh phyllopods of the female.

The adult is omnivorous, collecting food items with its phyllopods as it swims, climbs on vegetation, or digs in sediment. It is an ecosystem engineer in that it causes bioturbation, producing so much turbidity when it digs through the sediment that it may alter the ecology of its pool habitat by reducing plant cover.

Reproduction occurs when temporary pools fill with water. Larger females have higher fecundity, the clutch size ranging from eight to 61 eggs. The eggs can withstand a period of desiccation when the pool is dry; they will then hatch within three weeks of the pool refilling, often much more quickly. Desiccation is not required for hatching, however. The larva hatches as a metanauplius. It undergoes ecdysis, or molting, several times, growing more phyllopods each time. L. packardi takes about 38 days to mature, reproduces around its 54th day of life, and lives about 144 days. It is sexually mature when it is 10–12 mm (0.4–0.5 in) in carapace length. Fecundity is much reduced in individuals which are infested with a parasitic echinostome fluke.

== Conservation ==
Lepidurus packardi is a listed federally as an endangered species and by the IUCN RedList.

Threats to L. packardi include anything that destroys, degrades, or fragments its ephemeral pool habitat. Nine percent of historical vernal pool habitat remains today, and it is fragmented and isolated. Expanding urban development is the cause of habitat destruction in many areas. Agricultural development is another cause. The construction of the University of California, Merced, campus was scheduled to alter the habitat in the area, but it also included plans for protection of over 20,000 acres (8,100 ha).

Habitat can also be degraded when the local hydrology is altered, making the land too dry or permanently wet. There are many local conservation projects tailored to the needs of each region.
