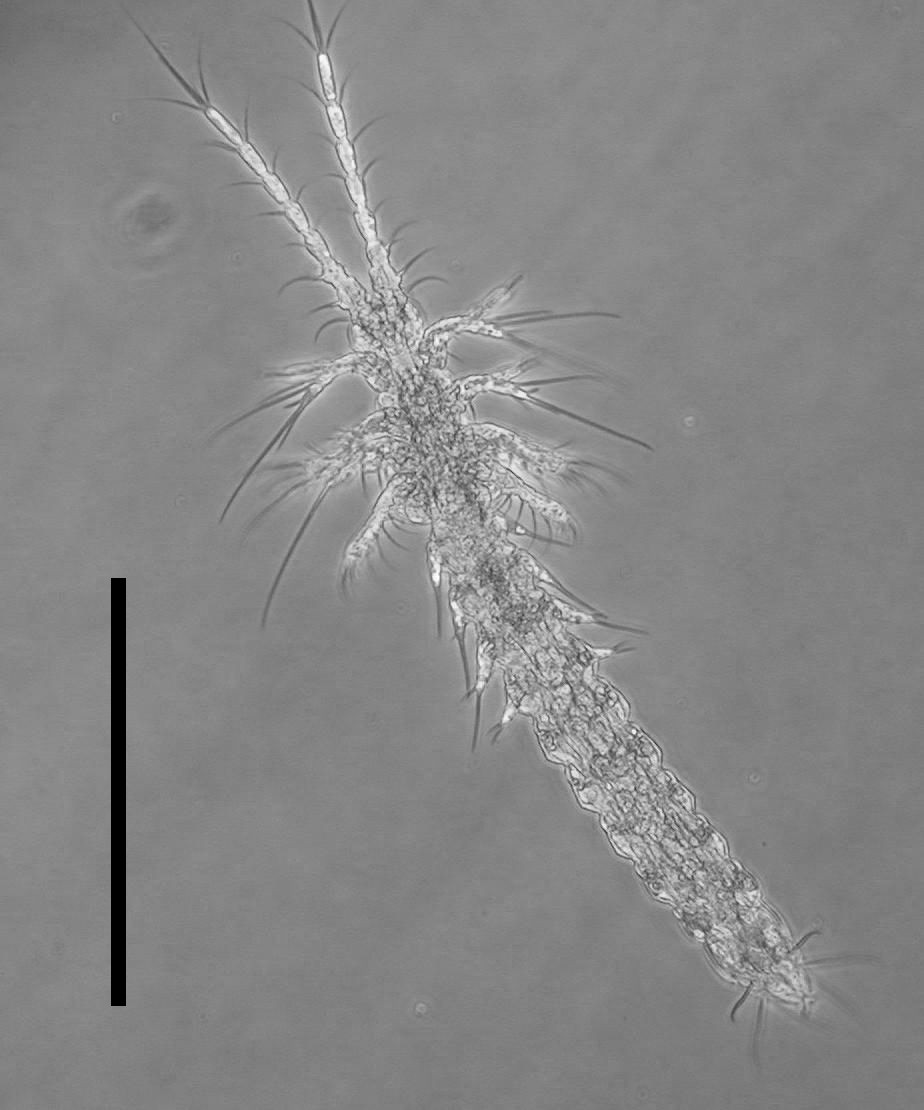
- Ctenocheilocaris galvarini

Scientific classification
- Kingdom: Animalia
- Phylum: Arthropoda
- Clade: Pancrustacea
- Superclass: Oligostraca
- Subclass: Mystacocarida; Pennak & Zinn, 1943
- Order: Mystacocaridida; Pennak & Zinn, 1943
- Family: Derocheilocarididae; Pennak & Zinn, 1943

Genera
- Ctenocheilocaris; Derocheilocaris

= Derocheilocarididae =

Subclass of crustaceans

Derocheilocarididae is a family of marine crustaceans that form part of the meiobenthos. It is the only family in the monotypic order Mystacocaridida, and the monotypic subclass Mystacocarida. These mystacocarids are less than 1 mm (0.04 in) long, and live interstitially in the intertidal zones of sandy beaches.

== Taxonomy ==
The taxonomy of the mystacocarids is extremely conservative, since all mystacocarids look superficially alike. As of December 2022, the 13 described species are divided between two genera, Derocheilocaris (eight species) and Ctenocheilocaris (five species). The first mystacocarids to be found were discovered on a beach in southern New England in 1939.

== Distribution ==
Mystacocarids occur along the coasts of South and North America, southern Africa, and the western Mediterranean. The lack of records from other parts of the world is "almost certainly" due to a lack of appropriate sampling, rather than a true absence.

== Description ==
Mystacocarids are tiny pigmentless crustaceans, less than 1 mm (0.039 in) long, that live in the spaces between sand grains on intertidal beaches. They have a cylindrical body, with five thoracic and five abdominal segments.

The appendages of the head—two pairs of long antennae, a pair of limb-like mandibles and two pairs of maxillae—are much longer than those on the thorax and have a number of fine hairs that the animal uses to strain detritus from the water to feed on. Also a labrum is present. The head is relatively large and divided into two by a stricture, so that the larger posterior part gives the appearance of being the thorax. The actual thorax has five pairs of thoracic limbs. The pair on the first segment has been modified into maxillipeds, which collaborates with the maxillae in the feeding process, but is not fused with the head. These three pairs of limbs looks similar, but the maxillipeds can be distinguished from the maxillae in the form of a vestigial exopod. The remaining four thoracic pairs of limbs has been reduced to small, unsegmented lobes, but the last pair is slightly modified in males. Their limbless abdomen ends in a supra-anal plate, a telson and a pair of large, pincer-like furca which on the ventral surface bears two sets of combs with setae. Because of their small size, there is no circulatory or respiratory system. A nauplius eye is completely absent. After mating, mystacocarids lay tiny eggs which hatch into a nauplius or metanauplius larva. Like the adults, the larvae are benthic.
