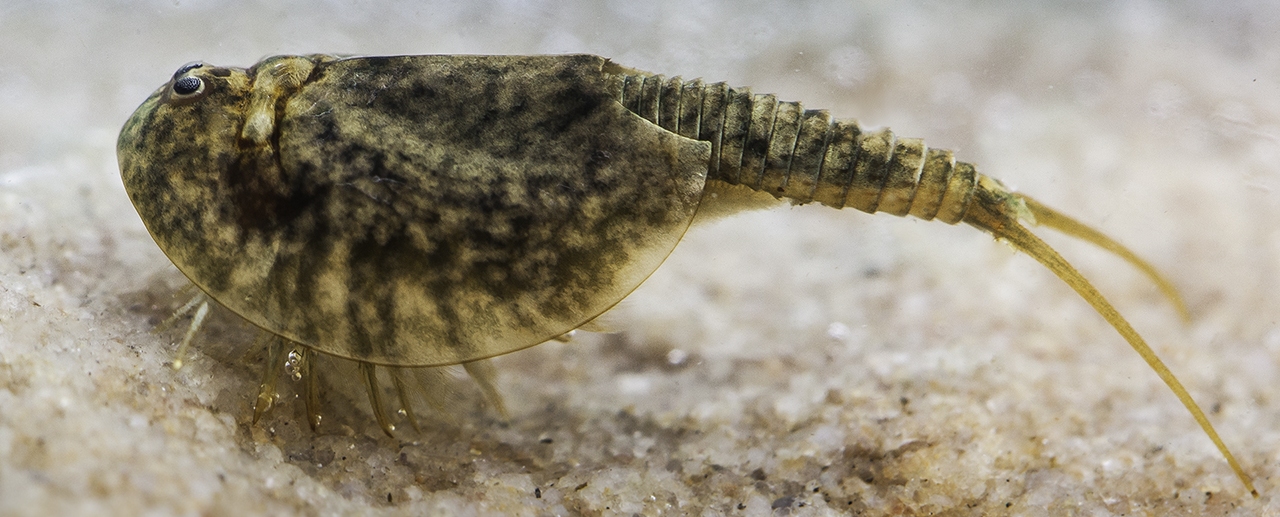

Scientific classification
- Kingdom: Animalia
- Phylum: Arthropoda
- Class: Branchiopoda
- Order: Notostraca
- Family: Triopsidae
- Genus: Lepidurus
- Species: L. arcticus

Binomial name
- Lepidurus arcticus (Pallas, 1793)

= Lepidurus arcticus =

Species of small freshwater animal

Lepidurus arcticus is a species of tadpole shrimp which inhabits ephemeral pools, ponds or permanent freshwater lakes of Finland, Norway, Sweden, Svalbard, Greenland, Iceland, Russia and the Kuril Islands.

Unlike other species of tadpole shrimp, Lepidurus arcticus is known to coexist with fish, such as Arctic char, brown trout and European whitefish. Furthermore, they exist in water temperatures much colder (4–7 °C or 39–45 °F) than the other species of its order. About 14 °C seems to be the upper thermal threshold for where in which waters it can live. It is a common predator of Daphnia pulex.
