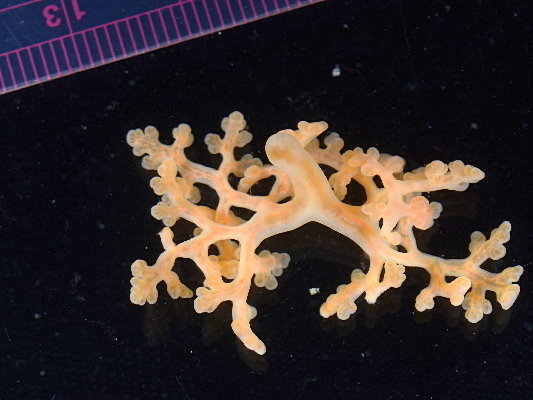
- Dendrogaster sp.

Scientific classification
- Domain: Eukaryota
- Kingdom: Animalia
- Phylum: Arthropoda
- Class: Thecostraca
- Order: Dendrogastrida
- Family: Dendrogastridae

= Dendrogastridae =

Family of crustaceans

Dendrogastridae is a family of crustaceans belonging to the order Dendrogastrida.

== Genera ==
- Bifurgaster Stone & Moyse, 1985
- Dendrogaster Knipovich, 1890
- Laocoon Nierstrasz & Entz, 1922
- Ulophysema Brattström, 1936
