= Raillietiellidae =

Scientific classification
- Kingdom: Animalia
- Phylum: Arthropoda
- Clade: Pancrustacea
- Class: Ichthyostraca
- Subclass: Pentastomida
- Order: Raillietiellida; Almeida & Christoffersen, 1999
- Family: Raillietiellidae; Sambon, 1922

Family of pentastomids

Raillietiellidae is a family of pentastomids and the only member of the monotypic order Raillietiellida. It contains two genera.

== Genera ==
Raillietiellidae contains the following genera:

- Raillietiella Sambon, 1910
- Yelirella Spratt, 2010
