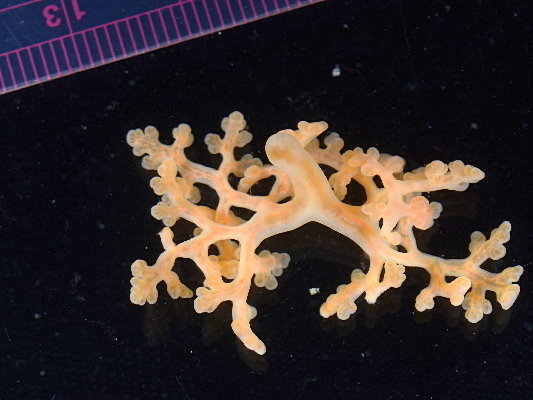
- Dendrogaster sp.

Scientific classification
- Kingdom: Animalia
- Phylum: Arthropoda
- Class: Thecostraca
- Subclass: Ascothoracida
- Order: Dendrogastrida; Grygier, 1987

Families
- Ascothoracidae; Ctenosculidae; Dendrogastridae

= Dendrogastrida =

Order of crustaceans

Dendrogastrida is an order of crustaceans belonging to the subclass Ascothoracida.
