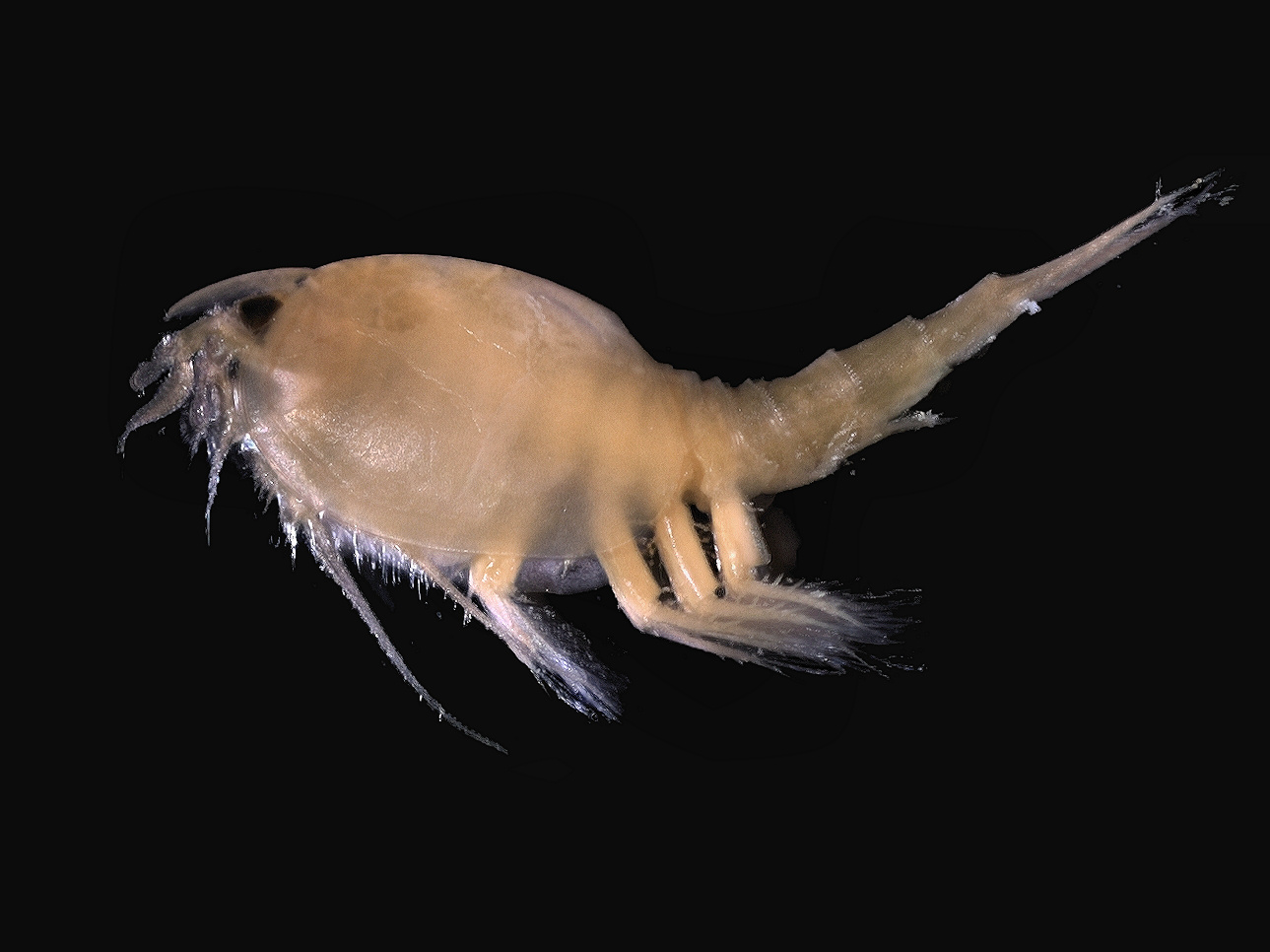
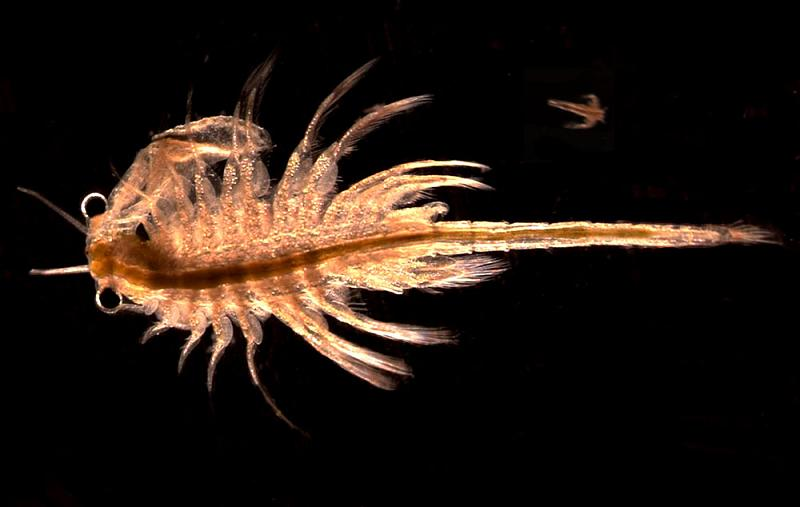
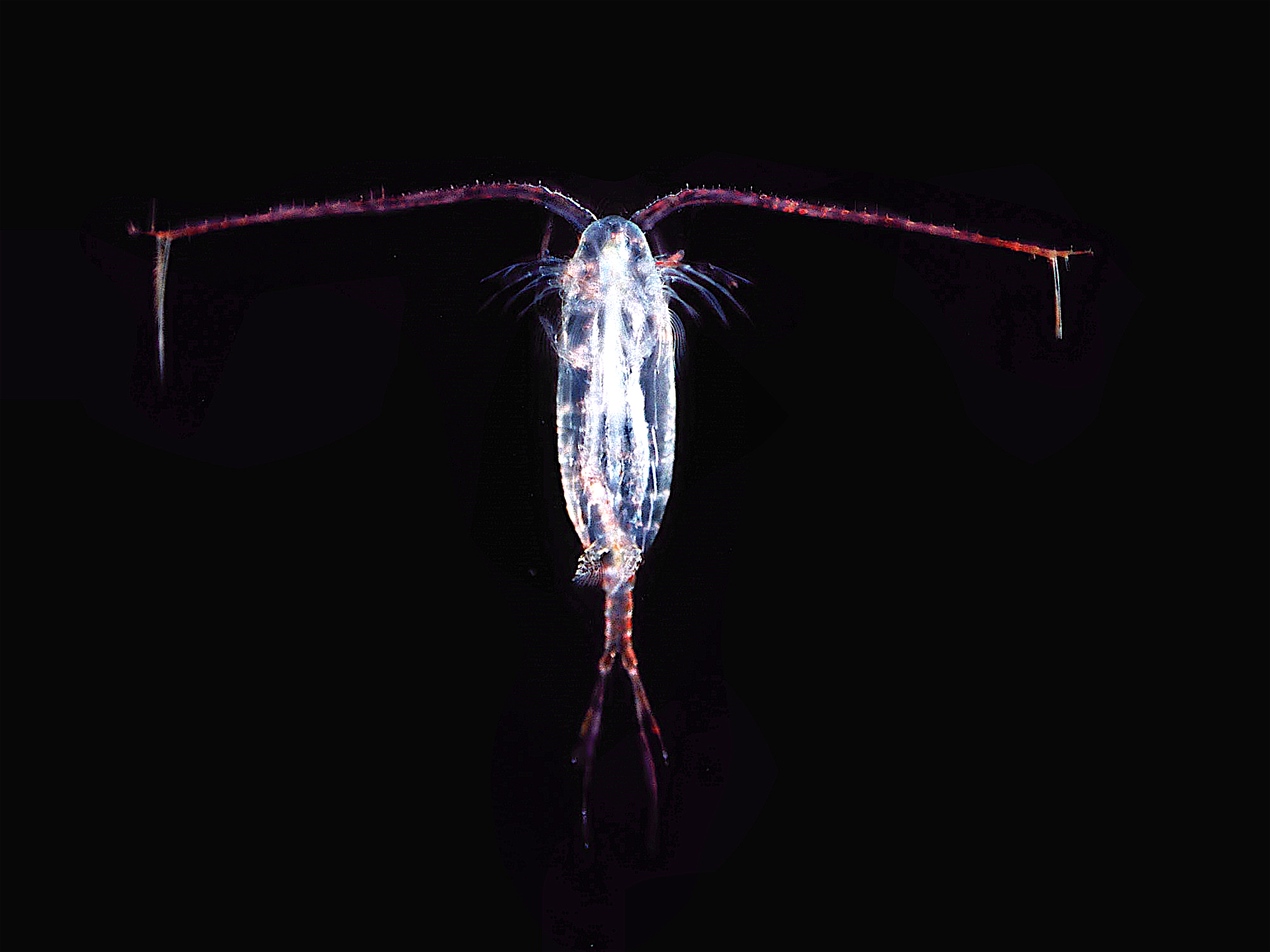
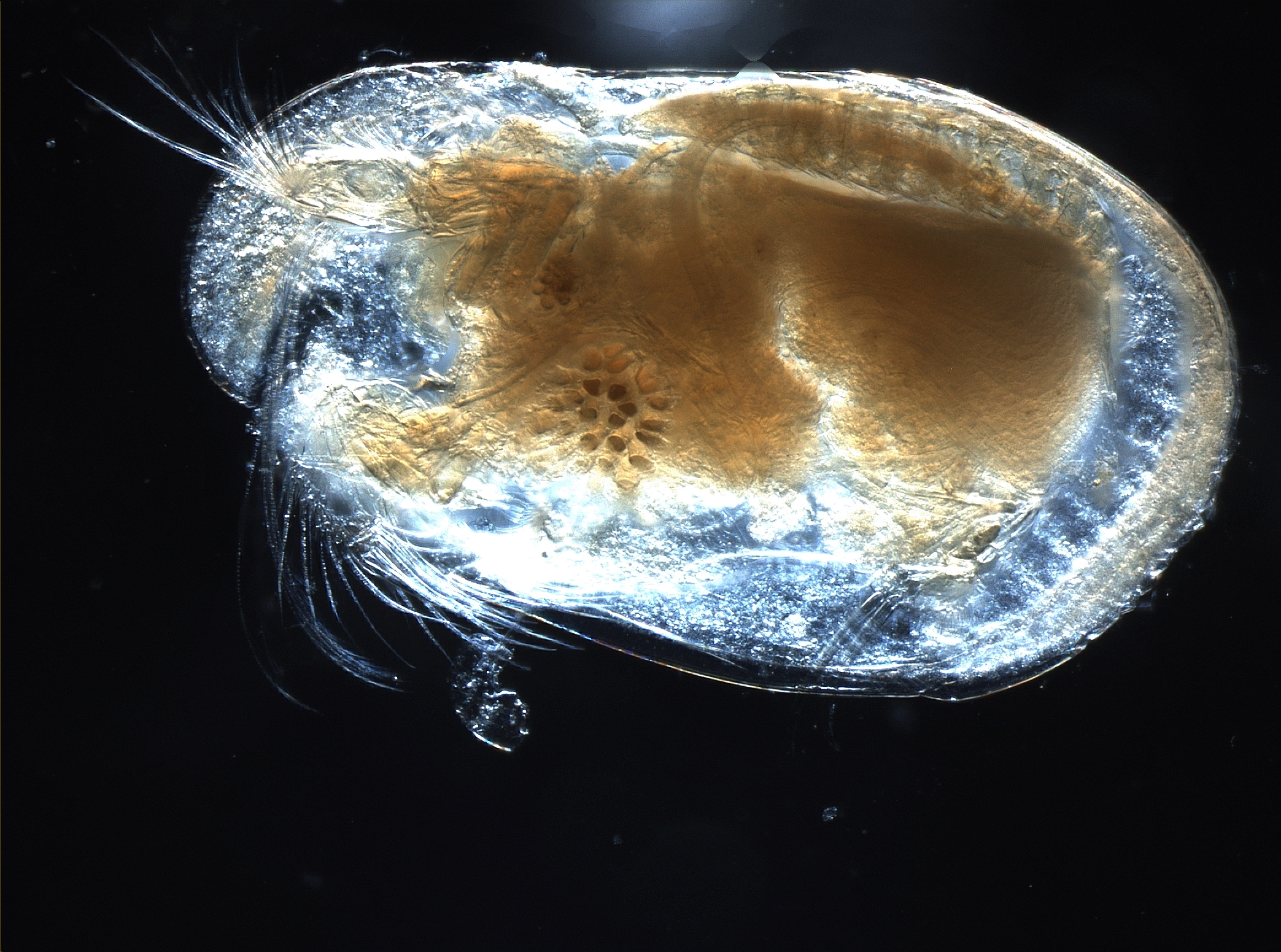
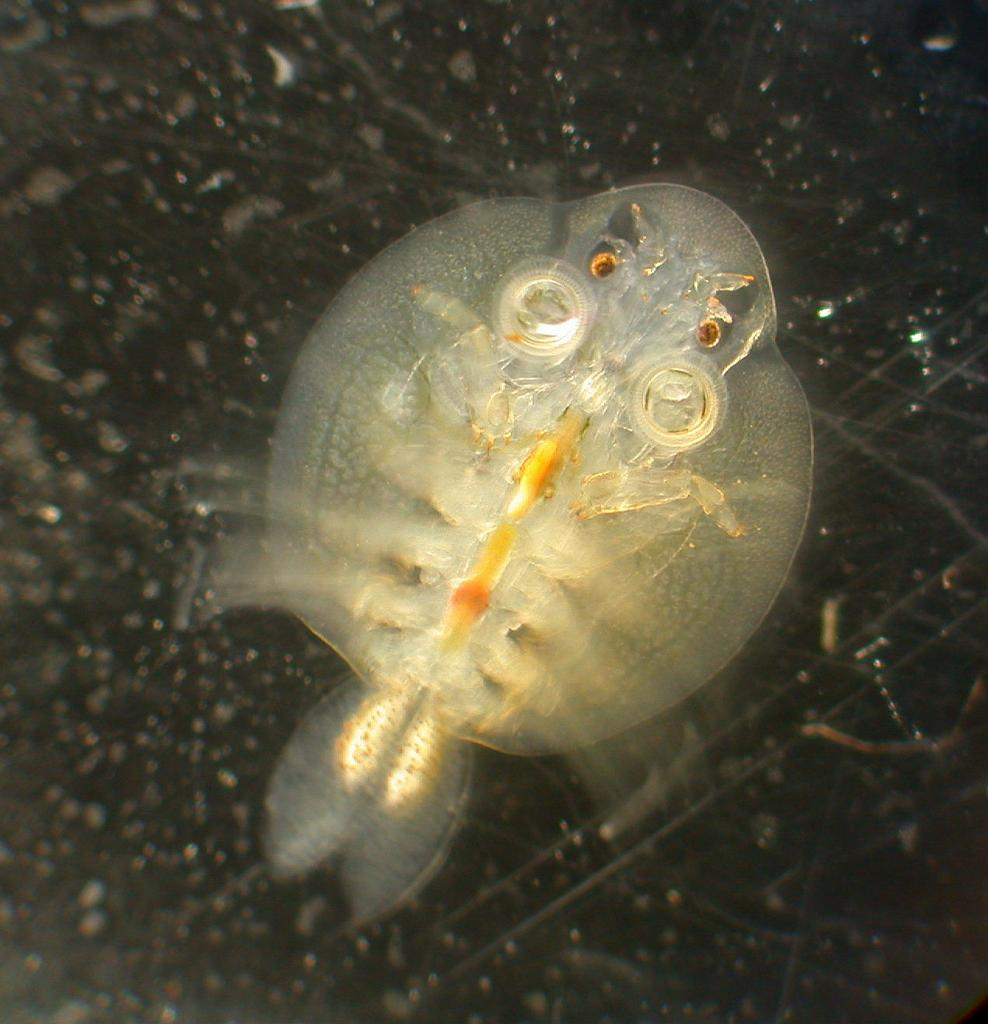
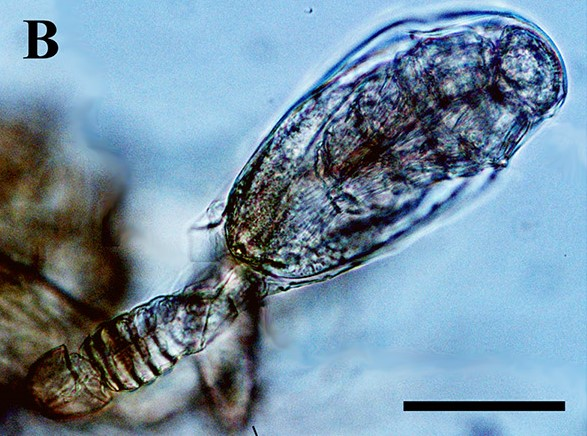
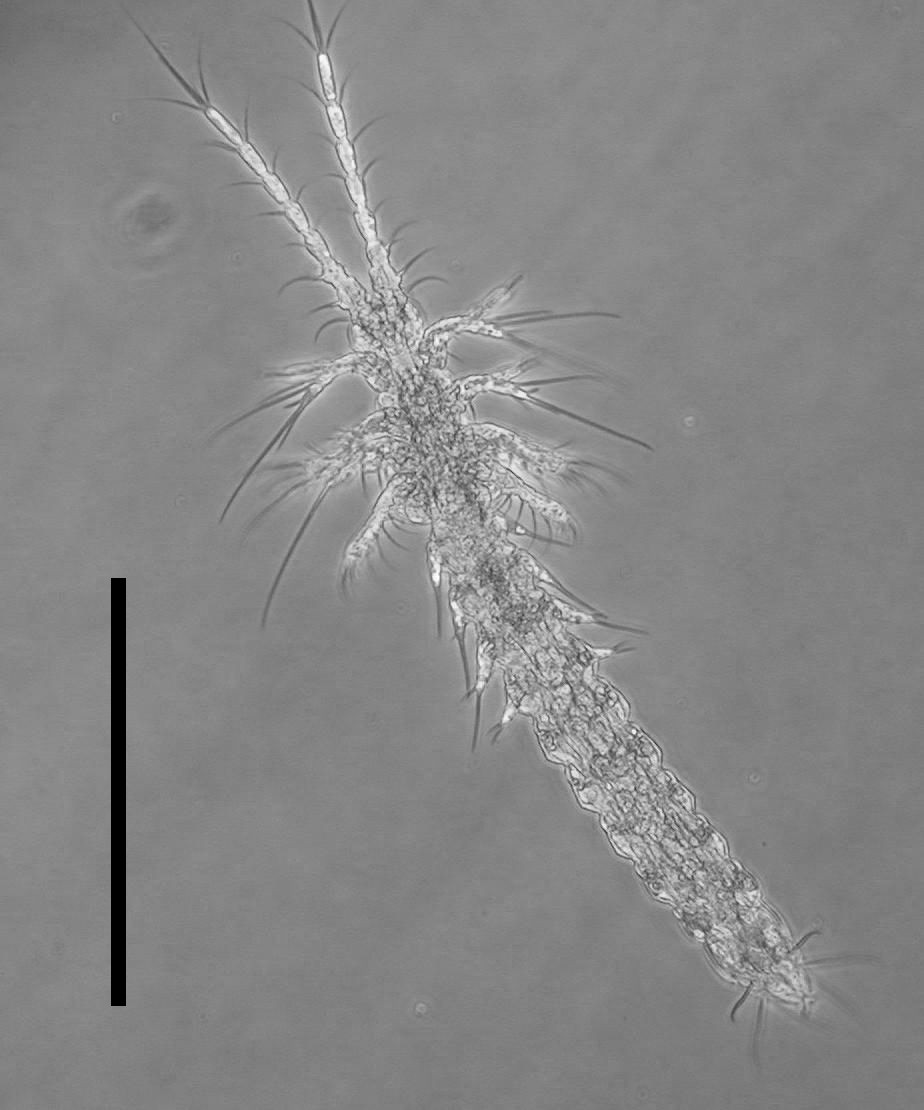
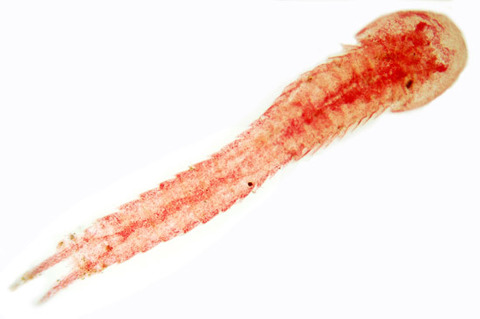
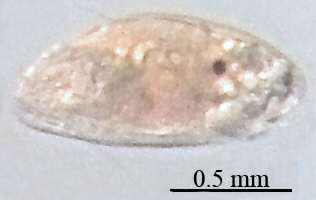
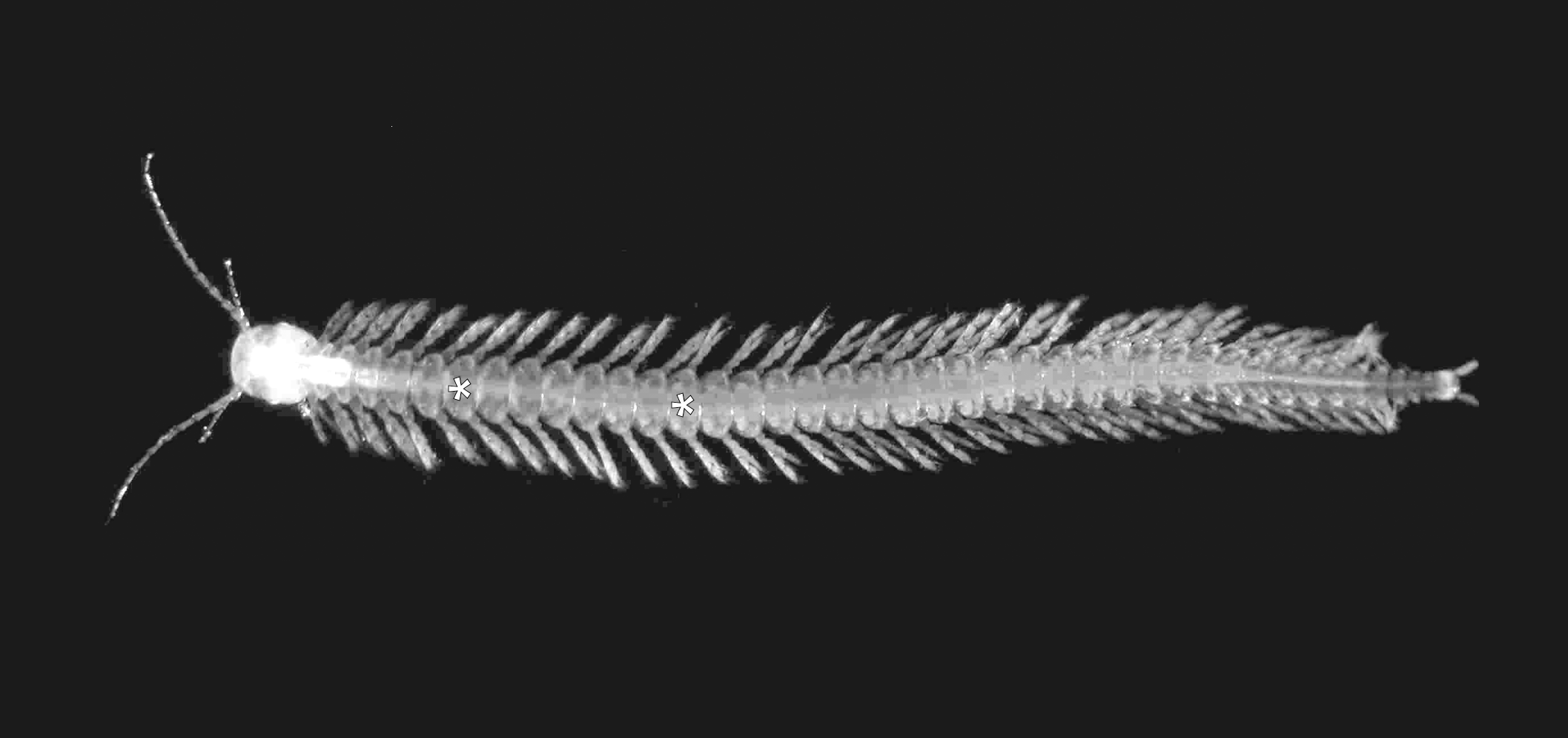
- Malacostraca Branchiopoda Copepoda Ostracoda Ichthyostraca Tantulocarida Mystacocarida Cephalocarida Thecostraca Remipedia

Scientific classification
- Kingdom: Animalia
- Phylum: Arthropoda
- Clade: Pancrustacea
- Subphylum: Crustacea; Brünnich, 1772

Groups included
- Oligostraca; Ichthyostraca; Mystacocarida; Ostracoda; Multicrustacea; †Cyclida; †Thylacocephala; Copepoda; Thecostraca; Malacostraca; Tantulocarida; †Priscansermarinidae; Allotriocarida (in part); Branchiopoda; Cephalocarida; Remipedia; †Waterstonellidea-incertae sedis

Cladistically included but traditionally excluded taxa
- Hexapoda

= Crustacean =

Crustaceans Temporal range: 517–0 Ma Cambrian to present

Group of arthropods

Crustaceans (from Latin word "crustacea" meaning: "those with shells" or "crusted ones") are mandibulate arthropods that are traditionally a part of the paraphyletic subphylum Crustacea (/krəˈsteɪʃə/). Crustaceans are mainly aquatic, including decapods (shrimps, prawns, crabs, lobsters, and crayfish), seed shrimps, branchiopods, fish lice, krill, remipedes, isopods, barnacles, copepods, opossum shrimps, amphipods and mantis shrimp. It is now well accepted that hexapods (insects and entognathans) are cladistically crustaceans, with the two groups now combined in the monophyletic clade Pancrustacea. The three classes Cephalocarida, Branchiopoda, and Remipedia are more closely related to the hexapods than they are to any other crustaceans (oligostracans and multicrustaceans).

The 67,000 described species range in size from Stygotantulus stocki at 0.1 mm (0.004 in), to the Japanese spider crab with a leg span of up to 3.8 m (12.5 ft) and a mass of 20 kg (44 lb). Like other arthropods, crustaceans have an exoskeleton, which they moult to grow. They are distinguished from other groups of arthropods, such as insects, myriapods and chelicerates, by the possession of biramous (two-parted) limbs, and by their larval forms, such as the nauplius stage of branchiopods and copepods.

Most crustaceans are free-living aquatic animals, but some are terrestrial (e.g. woodlice, sandhoppers), some are parasitic (e.g. Rhizocephala, fish lice, tongue worms) and some are sessile (e.g. barnacles). The group has an extensive fossil record, reaching back to the Cambrian. More than 7.9 million tons of crustaceans per year are harvested by fishery or farming for human consumption, consisting mostly of shrimp and prawns. Krill and copepods are not as widely fished, but may be the animals with the greatest biomass on the planet, and form a vital part of the food chain. The scientific study of crustaceans is known as carcinology (alternatively, malacostracology, crustaceology or crustalogy), and a scientist who works in carcinology is a carcinologist.

== Anatomy ==
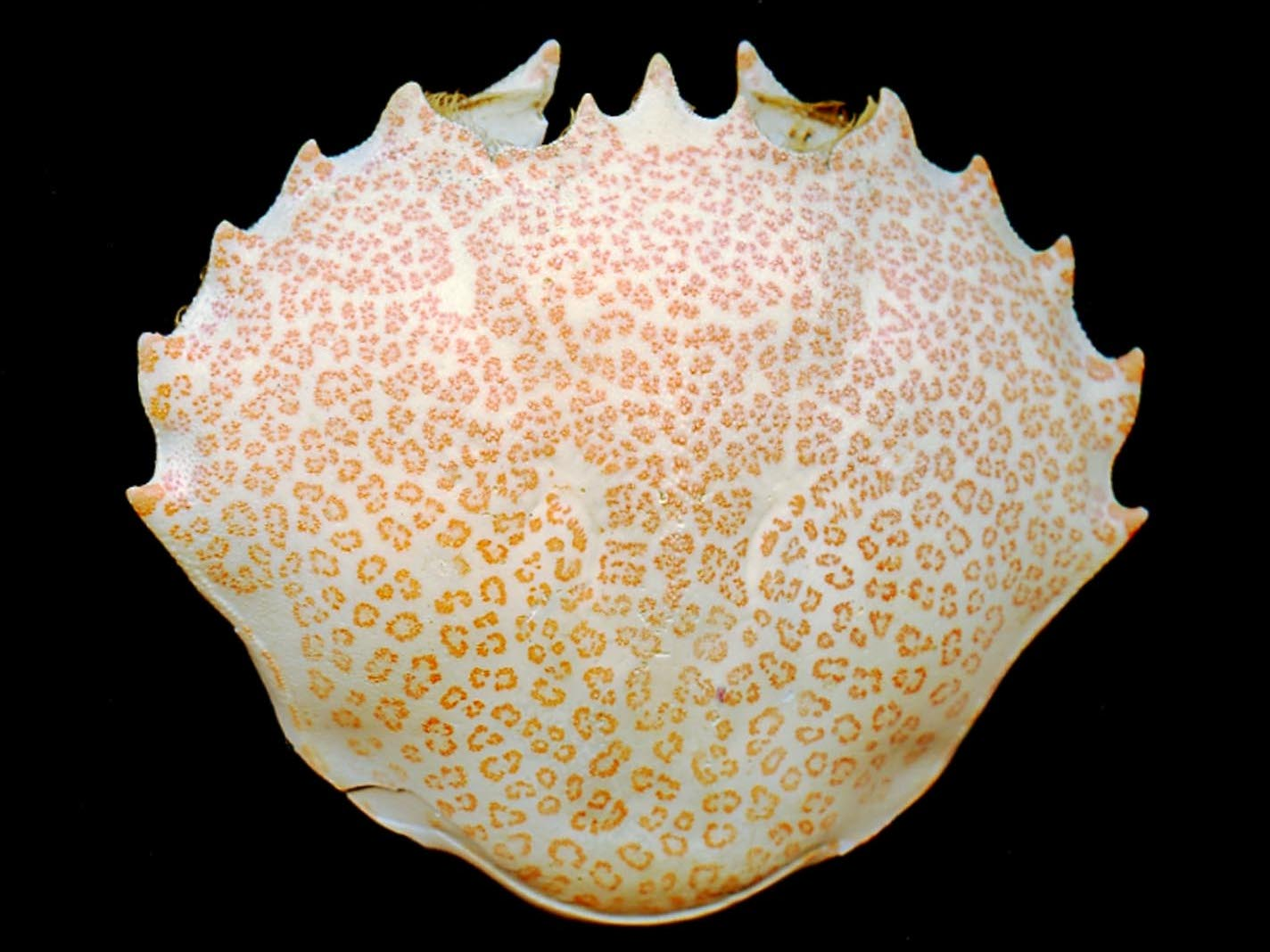
A shed carapace of a lady crab, part of the hard exoskeleton

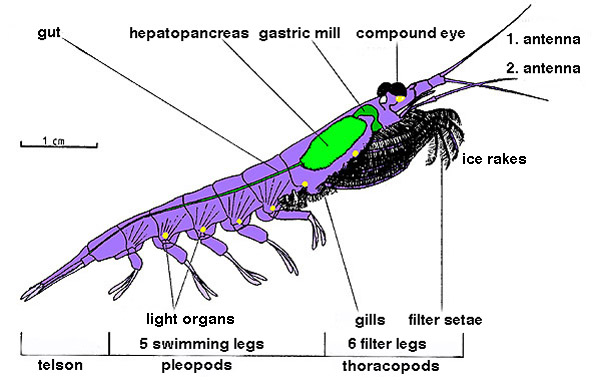
Body structure of a typical crustacean – krill

The body of a crustacean is composed of segments, which are grouped into three regions: the cephalon or head, the pereon or thorax, and the pleon or abdomen. The head and thorax may be fused together to form a cephalothorax, which may be covered by a single large carapace. The crustacean body is protected by the hard exoskeleton, which must be moulted for the animal to grow. The shell around each somite can be divided into a dorsal tergum, ventral sternum and a lateral pleuron. Various parts of the exoskeleton may be fused together.

Each somite, or body segment can bear a pair of appendages: on the segments of the head, these include two pairs of antennae, the mandibles and maxillae; the thoracic segments bear legs, which may be specialised as pereiopods (walking legs) and maxillipeds (feeding legs). Malacostraca and Remipedia (and the hexapods) have abdominal appendages. All other classes of crustaceans have a limbless abdomen, except from a telson and caudal rami which is present in many groups. The abdomen in malacostracans bears pleopods, and ends in a telson, which bears the anus, and is often flanked by uropods to form a tail fan. The number and variety of appendages in different crustaceans may be partly responsible for the group's success.

Crustacean appendages are typically biramous, meaning they are divided into two parts; this includes the second pair of antennae, but not the first, which is usually uniramous, the exception being in the class Malacostraca where the antennules may be generally biramous or even triramous. It is unclear whether the biramous condition is a derived state which evolved in crustaceans, or whether the second branch of the limb has been lost in all other groups. Trilobites, for instance, also possessed biramous appendages.

The main body cavity is an open circulatory system, where blood is pumped into the haemocoel by a heart located near the dorsum. Malacostraca have haemocyanin as the oxygen-carrying pigment, while copepods, ostracods, barnacles and branchiopods have haemoglobins. The alimentary canal consists of a straight tube that often has a gizzard-like "gastric mill" for grinding food and a pair of digestive glands that absorb food; this structure goes in a spiral format. Structures that function as kidneys are located near the antennae. A brain exists in the form of ganglia close to the antennae, and a collection of major ganglia is found below the gut.

In many decapods, the first (and sometimes the second) pair of pleopods are specialised in the male for sperm transfer. Many terrestrial crustaceans (such as the Christmas Island red crab) mate seasonally and return to the sea to release the eggs. Others, such as woodlice, lay their eggs on land, albeit in damp conditions. In most decapods, the females retain the eggs until they hatch into free-swimming larvae.

== Ecology ==
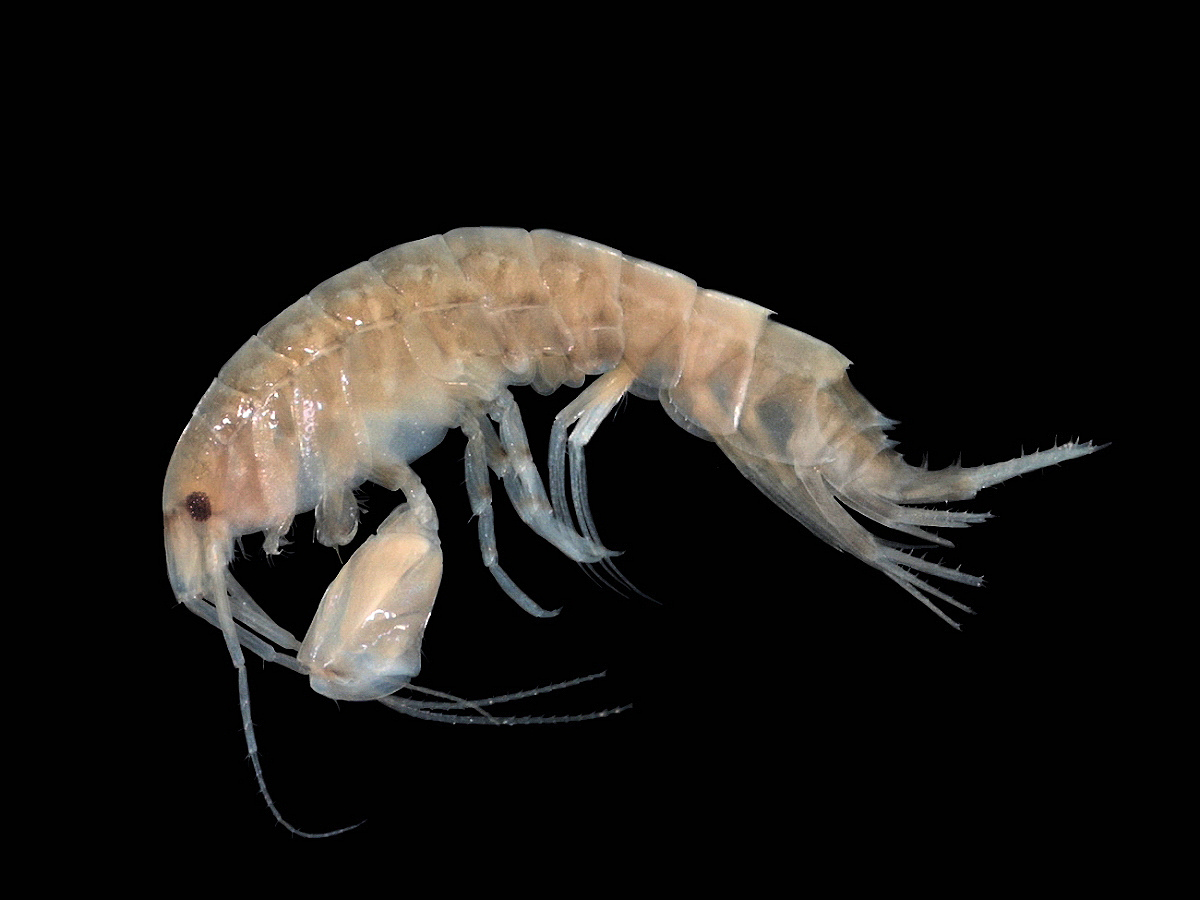
Abludomelita obtusata, an amphipod

Most crustaceans are aquatic, living in either marine or freshwater environments, but a few groups have adapted to life on land, such as terrestrial crabs, terrestrial hermit crabs, and woodlice. Marine crustaceans are as ubiquitous in the oceans as insects are on land. Most crustaceans are also motile, moving about independently, although a few taxonomic units are parasitic and live attached to their hosts (including sea lice, fish lice, whale lice, tongue worms, and Cymothoa exigua, all of which may be referred to as "crustacean lice"), and adult barnacles live a sessile life – they are attached headfirst to the substrate and cannot move independently. Some branchiurans are able to withstand rapid changes of salinity and will also switch hosts from marine to non-marine species. Krill are the bottom layer and most important part of the food chain in Antarctic animal communities. Some crustaceans are significant invasive species, such as the Chinese mitten crab, Eriocheir sinensis, and the Asian shore crab, Hemigrapsus sanguineus. Since the opening of the Suez Canal, close to 100 species of crustaceans from the Red Sea and the Indo-Pacific realm have established themselves in the eastern Mediterranean sub-basin, with often significant impact on local ecosystems.

== Life cycle ==
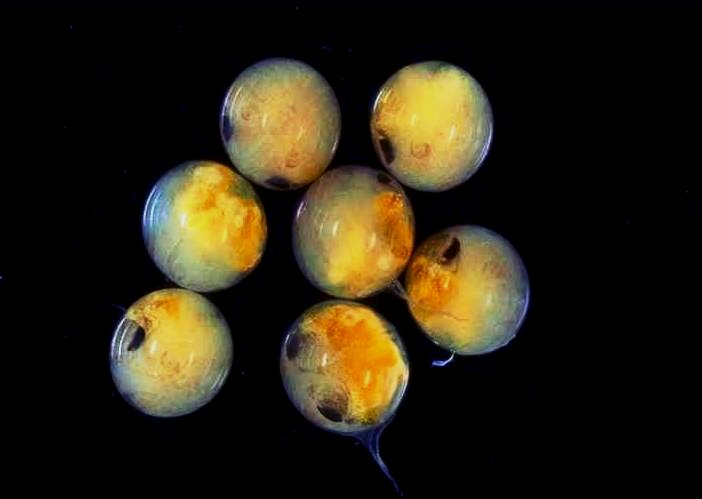
Eggs of Potamon fluviatile, a freshwater crab

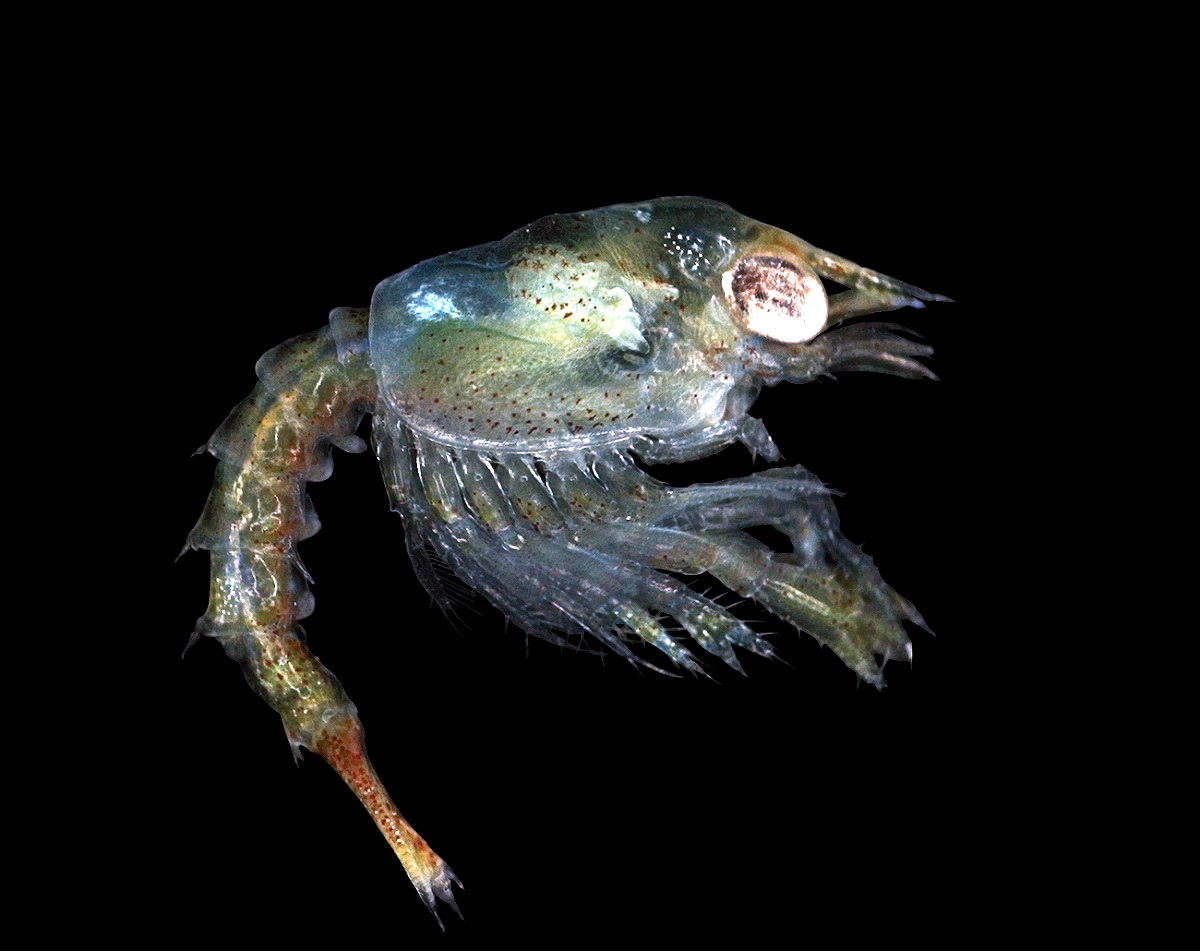
Zoea larva of the European lobster, Homarus gammarus

=== Mating system ===
Most crustaceans have separate sexes, and reproduce sexually. In fact, a recent study explains how the male T. californicus decide which females to mate with by dietary differences, preferring when the females are algae-fed instead of yeast-fed. A small number are hermaphrodites, including barnacles, remipedes, and Cephalocarida. Some may even change sex during the course of their life. Parthenogenesis is also widespread among crustaceans, where viable eggs are produced by a female without needing fertilisation by a male. This occurs in many branchiopods, some ostracods, some isopods, and certain "higher" crustaceans, such as the Marmorkrebs crayfish.

=== Eggs ===
In many crustaceans, the fertilised eggs are released into the water column, while others have developed a number of mechanisms for holding on to the eggs until they are ready to hatch. Most decapods carry the eggs attached to the pleopods, while peracarids, notostracans, anostracans, and many isopods form a brood pouch from the carapace and thoracic limbs. Female Branchiura do not carry eggs in external ovisacs but attach them in rows to rocks and other objects. Most leptostracans and krill carry the eggs between their thoracic limbs; some copepods carry their eggs in special thin-walled sacs, while others have them attached together in long, tangled strings.

=== Larvae ===
Crustaceans exhibit a number of larval forms, of which the earliest and most characteristic is the nauplius. This has three pairs of appendages, all emerging from the young animal's head, and a single naupliar eye. In most groups, there are further larval stages, including the zoea (pl. zoeæ or zoeas). This name was given to it when naturalists believed it to be a separate species. It follows the nauplius stage and precedes the post-larva. Zoea larvae swim with their thoracic appendages, as opposed to nauplii, which use cephalic appendages, and megalopa, which use abdominal appendages for swimming. It often has spikes on its carapace, which may assist these small organisms in maintaining directional swimming. In many decapods, due to their accelerated development, the zoea is the first larval stage. In some cases, the zoea stage is followed by the mysis stage, and in others, by the megalopa stage, depending on the crustacean group involved.

Providing camouflage against predators, the otherwise black eyes in several forms of swimming larvae are covered by a thin layer of crystalline isoxanthopterin that gives their eyes the same color as the surrounding water, while tiny holes in the layer allow light to reach the retina. As the larvae mature into adults, the layer migrates to a new position behind the retina where it works as a backscattering mirror that increases the intensity of light passing through the eyes, as seen in many nocturnal animals.

=== DNA repair ===
In an effort to understand whether DNA repair processes can protect crustaceans against DNA damage, basic research was conducted to elucidate the repair mechanisms used by Penaeus monodon (black tiger shrimp). Repair of DNA double-strand breaks was found to be predominantly carried out by accurate homologous recombinational repair. Another, less accurate process, microhomology-mediated end joining, is also used to repair such breaks. The expression pattern of DNA repair related and DNA damage response genes in the intertidal copepod Tigriopus japonicus was analyzed after ultraviolet irradiation. This study revealed increased expression of proteins associated with the DNA repair processes of non-homologous end joining, homologous recombination, base excision repair and DNA mismatch repair.

== Classification and phylogeny ==
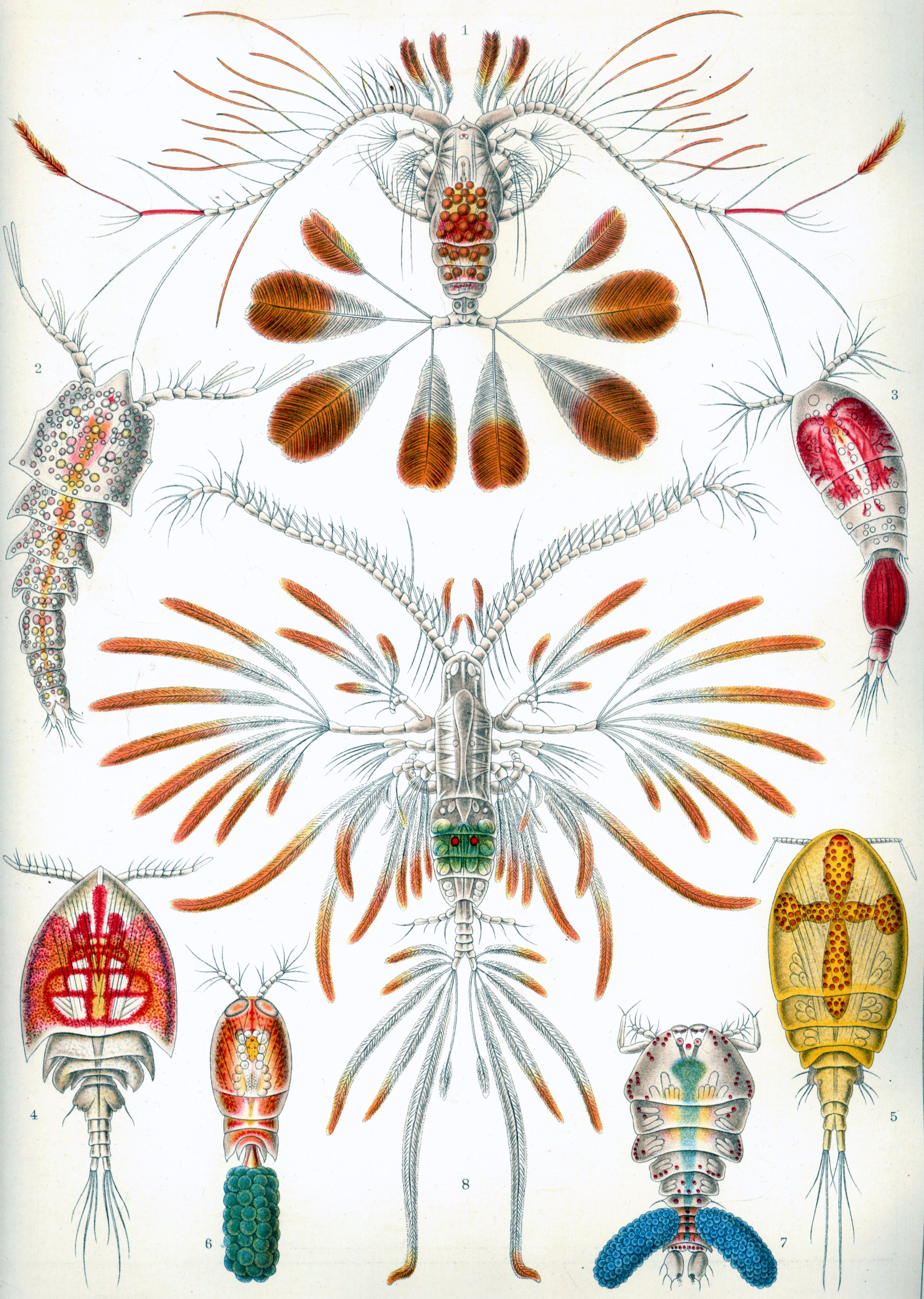
Copepods, from Ernst Haeckel's 1904 work Kunstformen der Natur

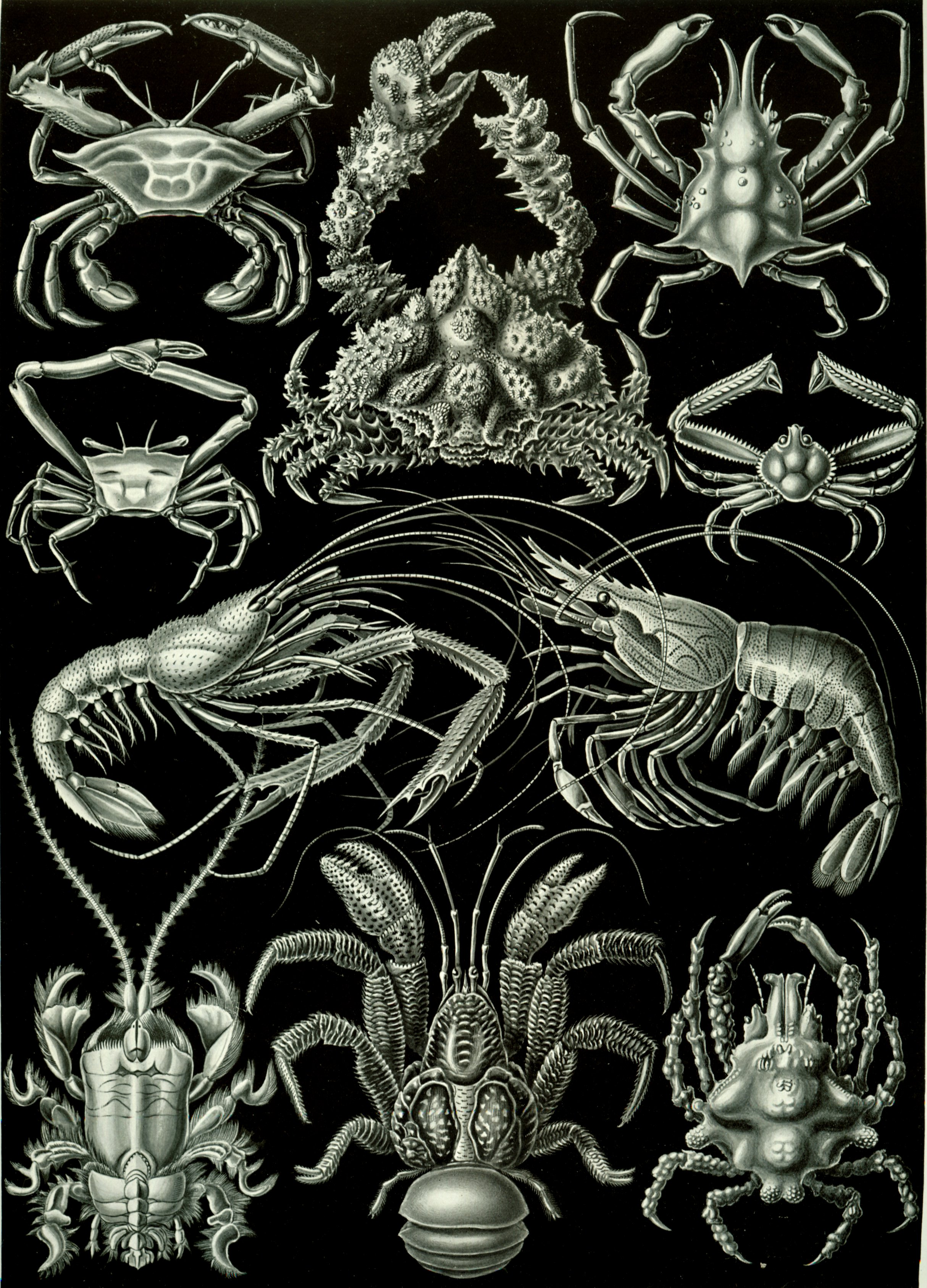
Decapods, from Ernst Haeckel's 1904 work Kunstformen der Natur

The name "crustacean" dates from the earliest works to describe the animals, including those of Pierre Belon and Guillaume Rondelet, but the name was not used by some later authors, including Carl Linnaeus, who included crustaceans among the "Aptera" in his Systema Naturae. The earliest nomenclatural valid work to use the name "Crustacea" was Morten Thrane Brünnich's Zoologiæ Fundamenta in 1772, although he also included chelicerates in the group.

The subphylum Crustacea comprises almost 67,000 described species, which is thought to be just 1/10 to 1/100 of the total number as most species remain as yet undiscovered. Although most crustaceans are small, their morphology varies greatly and includes both the largest arthropod in the world – the Japanese spider crab with a leg span of 3.7 metres (12 ft) – and some of the smallest, such as Tantulacus dieteri, with a total body length of only 85 micrometres (0.0033 in). Despite their diversity of form, crustaceans are united by the special larval form known as the nauplius.

The exact relationships of the Crustacea to other taxa are not completely settled as of April 2012. Studies based on morphology led to the Pancrustacea hypothesis, in which Crustacea and Hexapoda (insects and allies) are sister groups. More recent studies using DNA sequences suggest that Crustacea is paraphyletic, with the hexapods nested within a larger Pancrustacea clade.

The traditional classification of Crustacea based on morphology recognised four to six classes. Bowman and Abele (1982) recognised 652 extant families and 38 orders, organised into six classes: Branchiopoda, Remipedia, Cephalocarida, Maxillopoda, Ostracoda, and Malacostraca. Martin and Davis (2001) updated this classification, retaining the six classes but including 849 extant families in 42 orders. Despite outlining the evidence that Maxillopoda was non-monophyletic, they retained it as one of the six classes, although did suggest that Maxillipoda could be replaced by elevating its subclasses to classes. Since then phylogenetic studies have confirmed the polyphyly of Maxillopoda and the paraphyletic nature of Crustacea with respect to Hexapoda. Recent classifications recognise ten to twelve classes in Crustacea or Pancrustacea, with several former maxillopod subclasses now recognised as classes (e.g. Thecostraca, Tantulocarida, Mystacocarida, Copepoda, Branchiura and Pentastomida).

Class	Members	Orders	Photo
Ostracoda	Seed shrimp	Myodocopida; Halocyprida; Platycopida; Podocopida	Cylindroleberididae (Myodocopida)
Mystacocarida	Mystococaridans	Mystococarida	Ctenocheilocaris galvarini
Ichthyostraca (alternatively the subclasses Branchiura and Pentastomida may be recognised as classes)	Tongue worms and fish lice	Cephalobaenida; Porocephalida; Raillietiellida; Reighardiida; Arguloida	Armillifer armillatus (Porocephalida)
Thecostraca	Facetotecta; Ascothoracida; Barnacles	Facetotecta; Dendrogastrida; Laurida; Cryptophialida; Lithoglyptida etc.	Perforatus perforatus (Cirripedia)
Copepoda	Copepods	Calanoida; Polyarthra; Cyclopoida; Gelyelloida; Harpacticoida; Misophrioida etc.	Cylindroleberididae (Calanoida)
Tantulocarida	Tantulocaridians		Microdajus sp.
Malacostraca	Mantis shrimp Decapods; Krill; Isopods; Hooded shrimp Amphipods etc.	Stomatopoda; Decapoda; Euphausiacea; Isopoda; Cumacea; Amphipoda etc.	Ocypode ceratophthalma (Decapoda)
Cephalocarida	Horseshoe shrimp	Brachypoda	Hutchinsoniella macracantha
Branchiopoda	Fairy shrimp Water Fleas; Tadpole shrimp Clam shrimp	Anostraca; Notostraca; Laevicaudata; Spinicaudata etc.	Lepidurus arcticus (Notostraca)
Remipedia	Remipedes	Nectiopoda †Enantiopoda	Speleonectes tanumekes
Hexapoda	Springtails; Proturans; Diplurans; Insects	Odonata; Orthoptera; Coleoptera; Neuroptera; Hymenoptera etc.	Mantispa styriaca (Neuroptera)

The following cladogram shows the updated relationships between the different extant groups of the paraphyletic Crustacea in relation to the class Hexapoda.

- Pancrustacea
  - Oligostraca
    - Ostracoda
    - - Mystacocarida
      - Ichthyostraca
        - Branchiura
        - Pentastomida
  - Altocrustacea
    - Multicrustacea
      - Malacostraca
      - - Copepoda
        - - Tantulocarida
          - Thecostraca
    - Allotriocarida
      - Cephalocarida
      - Athalassocarida
        - Branchiopoda
        - Labiocarida
          - Remipedia
          - Hexapoda

According to this diagram, the Hexapoda are deep in the Crustacea tree, and any of the Hexapoda is distinctly closer to e.g. a Multicrustacean than an Oligostracan is.

== Fossil record ==
The earliest crustaceans had already appeared in the fossil record by 517 million years ago during Cambrian Stage 3 in the Chengjiang biota, which represent relatives of living crustacean lineages, indicating that they had already substantially cryptically diversified by the mid-Cambrian, despite their sparse fossil record during this time.

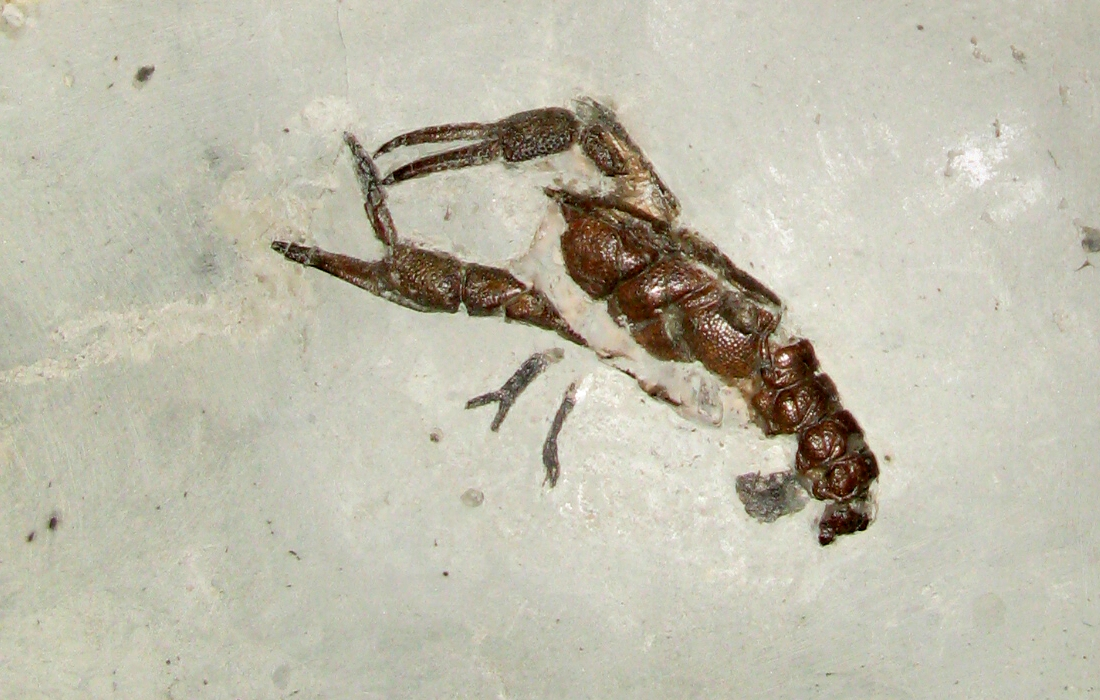
Eryma mandelslohi, a fossil decapod from the Jurassic of Bissingen an der Teck, Germany

Crustaceans have a rich and extensive fossil record, most of the major groups of crustaceans appear in the fossil record before the end of the Cambrian, namely the Branchiopoda, Maxillopoda (including barnacles and tongue worms) and Malacostraca; there is some debate as to whether or not Cambrian animals assigned to Ostracoda are truly ostracods, which would otherwise start in the Ordovician. The only classes to appear later are the Cephalocarida, which have no fossil record, and the Remipedia, which were first described from the fossil Tesnusocaris goldichi, but do not appear until the Carboniferous. Most of the early crustaceans are rare, but fossil crustaceans become abundant from the Carboniferous period onwards.

Within the Malacostraca, no fossils are known for krill, while both Hoplocarida and Phyllopoda contain important groups that are now extinct as well as extant members (Hoplocarida: mantis shrimp are extant, while Aeschronectida are extinct; Phyllopoda: Canadaspidida are extinct, while Leptostraca are extant). Cumacea and Isopoda are both known from the Carboniferous, as are the first true mantis shrimp. In the Decapoda, prawns and polychelids appear in the Triassic, and shrimp and crabs appear in the Jurassic. The fossil burrow Ophiomorpha is attributed to ghost shrimps, whereas the fossil burrow Camborygma is attributed to crayfishes. The Permian–Triassic deposits of Nurra preserve the oldest (Permian: Roadian) fluvial burrows ascribed to ghost shrimps (Decapoda: Axiidea, Gebiidea) and crayfishes (Decapoda: Astacidea, Parastacidea), respectively.

However, the great radiation of crustaceans occurred in the Cretaceous, particularly in crabs, and may have been driven by the adaptive radiation of their main predators, bony fish. The first true lobsters also appear in the Cretaceous.

== Consumption by humans ==
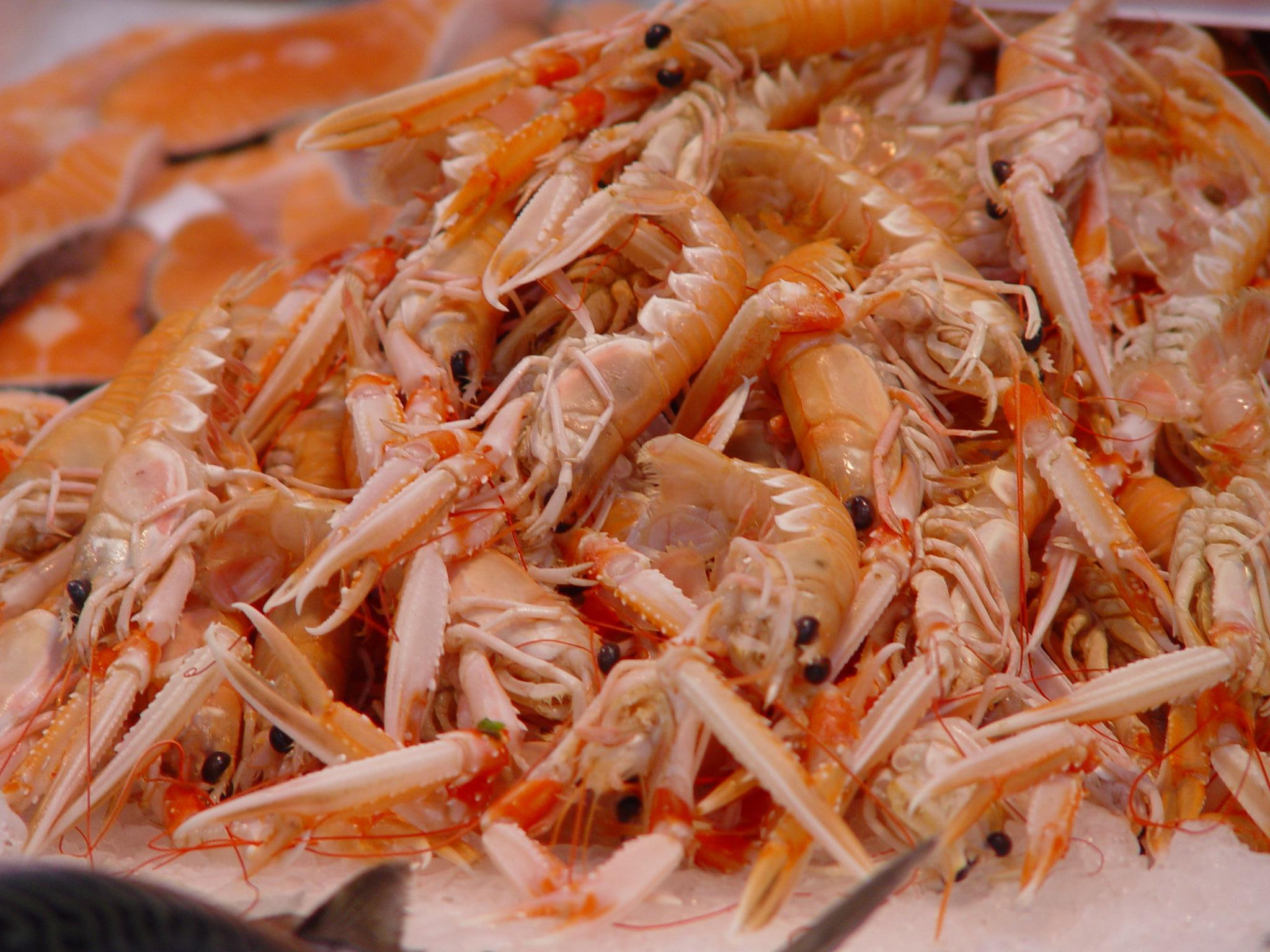
Norway lobsters on sale at a Spanish market

Many crustaceans are consumed by humans, and nearly 10,700,000 tons were harvested in 2007; the vast majority of this output is of decapod crustaceans: crabs, lobsters, shrimp, crawfish, and prawns. Over 60% by weight of all crustaceans caught for consumption are shrimp and prawns, and nearly 80% is produced in Asia, with China alone producing nearly half the world's total. Non-decapod crustaceans are not widely consumed, with only 118,000 tons of krill being caught, despite krill having one of the greatest biomasses on the planet.

== See also ==
- Pain in crustaceans
