= Taxonomy of invertebrates (Brusca & Brusca, 2003) =

System of classification of animals with emphasis on the invertebrates

The biological systematics and taxonomy of invertebrates as proposed by Richard C. Brusca and Gary J. Brusca in 2003 is a system of classification of invertebrates, as a way to classify animals without backbones.

== Prokaryotes ==
- Kingdom Eubacteria, also known as Bacteria – Domain of microorganisms
- Kingdom Archaea, also known as Archaebacteria – Domain of organisms

== Eukaryotes (Eukaryota, or Eukarya) ==
- Kingdom Fungi – Organism belonging to kingdom Fungi
- Kingdom Plantae – Kingdom of life (= Metaphyta)
- Kingdom Protista – Eukaryotes other than animals, plants or fungi

- Phylum Euglenida – Class of protozoans
- Phylum Kinetoplastida – Flagellated protists belonging to the phylum Euglenozoa
- Alveolata phyla – Clade of protists

- Phylum Ciliophora – Taxon of protozoans with hair-like organelles called cilia
- Phylum Apicomplexa – Phylum of parasitic alveolates
- Phylum Dinoflagellata – Aquatic, unicellular protists with two flagella

- Phylum Stramenopila – Clade of eukaryotes
- Phylum Rhizopoda – Cellular body type
- Phylum Actinopoda – Cellular body type
- Phylum Granuloreticulosa – Phylum of amoeboid protists
- Phylum Diplomonadida – Group of mostly parasitic flagellates
- Phylum Parabasilida – Group of flagellated protists
- Phylum Cryptomonada – Group of algae and colorless flagellates
- Phylum Microspora – Genus of green algae
- Phylum Ascetospora – Group of eukaryotes that are parasites of animals
- Phylum Choanoflagellata – Group of eukaryotes considered the closest living relatives of animals
- Phylum Chlorophyta – Phylum of green algae
- Phylum Opalinida – Small group of peculiar heterokonts
- Incertae sedis: Genus Stephanopogon – Genus of flagellate marine protozoan

=== Kingdom Animalia (Metazoa) ===
==== Parazoa ====
===== Phylum Porifera =====
- Phylum Porifera

- Class Calcarea

- Subclass Calcinea
- Subclass Calcaronea

- Class Hexactinellida

- Subclass Amphidiscophora
- Subclass Hexasterophora

- Class Demospongiae

- Subclass Homoscleromorpha
- Subclass Tetractinomorpha
- Subclass Ceractinomorpha

==== Mesozoa ====
===== Phylum Placozoa =====
- Phylum Placozoa

- Trichoplax adhaerens

===== Phylum Monoblastozoa =====
- Phylum Monoblastozoa

- Salinella

===== Phylum Rhombozoa =====
- Phylum Rhombozoa

- Order Dicyemida
- Order Heterocyemida

===== Phylum Orthonectida =====
- Phylum Orthonectida

==== Eumetazoa ====
===== Radiata =====
====== Phylum Cnidaria ======
- Phylum Cnidaria

- Class Hydrozoa

- Order Hydroida

- Suborder Anthomedusae (= Gymnoblastea or Athecata)
- Suborder Leptomedusae (= Calyptoblastea or Thecata)

- Order Trachylina
- Order Siphonophora
- Order Chondrophora
- Order Actinulida

- Class Anthozoa

- Subclass Octocorallia (= Alcyonaria)

- Order Alcyonacea
- Order Gastraxonacea
- Order Gorgonacea
- Order Helioporacea
- Order Pennatulacea
- Order Protoalcyonaria
- Order Stolonifera
- Order Telestacea

- Subclass Hexacorallia (= Zoantharia)

- Order Actiniaria
- Order Scleractinia (= Madreporaria)
- Order Zoanthidea
- Order Corallimorpharia

- Subclass Ceriantipatharia

- Order Antipatharia
- Order Ceriantharia

- Class Cubozoa
- Class Scyphozoa

- Order Stauromedusae
- Order Coronatae
- Order Semaeostomae
- Order Rhizostomae

====== Phylum Ctenophora ======
- Phylum Ctenophora

- Order Beroida
- Order Cestida
- Order Cydippida
- Order Ganeshida
- Order Lobata
- Order Platyctenida
- Order Thalassocalycida

===== Bilateria =====
The authors divide the bilaterians in three informal groups:

- acoelomates (phyla Platyhelminthes, Gastrotricha, Entoprocta, Gnathostomulida, Cycliophora)
- blastocoelomate (or pseducoelomate, phyla Rotifera, Kinorhyncha, Nematoda, Nematomorpha, Acanthocephala, Loricifera)
- coelomates (or eucoelomates, phyla Nemertea, Priapula, Annelida, Sipuncula, Echiura, Onychophora, Tardigrada, Arthropoda, Mollusca, Phoronida, Ectoprocta, Brachiopoda, Echinodermata, Chaetognatha, Hemichordata, Chordata).

Several groups traditionally viewed as having a blastocoelomate condition are viewed here as acoelomates (e.g., Gastrotricha, Entoprocta, Gnathostomulida).

Some of the coelomates groups (e.g., Arthropoda, Mollusca) have greatly reduced celomic spaces; often the main body cavity is a bloodfilled space called a hemocoel, and is associated with an open circulatory system.

The Brachiopoda, Ectoprocta and Phoronida are viewed as lophophorates.

In a phylogeny, the bilaterians are divided in:

- Protostomia

- Cycloneuralia

- Loricifera
- Kinorhyncha
- Priapula
- Nematomorpha
- Nemata
- Gastrotricha

- Acanthocephala
- Rotifera
- Cycliophora
- Entoprocta
- Gnathostomulida
- Articulata

- Arthropoda
- Tardigrada
- Onychophora
- Annelida

- Echiura
- Mollusca
- Sipuncula
- Nemertea
- Platyhelminthes

- Deuterostomia

- Chordata

- Vertebrata
- Cephalochordata
- Urochordata

- Hemichordata

- Pterobranchia
- Enteropneusta

- Echinodermata
- Chaetognatha
- Brachiopoda
- Ectoprocta
- Phoronida

====== Phylum Platyhelminthes ======
- Phylum Platyhelminthes

- Class Turbellaria

- Order Acoela
- Order Catenulida
- Order Haplopharyngida
- Order Lecithoepitheliata
- Order Macrostomida
- Order Nemertodermatida
- Order Polycladida
- Order Prolecithophora
- Order Proplicastomata
- Order Proseriata
- Order Rhabdocoela

- Suborder Dalyellioida
- Suborder Thyphloplanoida
- Suborder Kalyptorhynchia
- Suborder Temnocephalida

- Order Tricladida

- Class Monogenea

- Subclass Monopisthocotylea
- Subclass Polyopisthocotylea

- Class Trematoda

- Subclass Digenea
- Subclass Aspidogastrea

- Class Cestoda

- Subclass Cestodaria
- Subclass Eucestoda

====== Phylum Nemertea ======
- Phylum Nemertea

- Class Anopla
- Class Enopla

====== Phylum Rotifera ======
- Phylum Rotifera

- Class Digonata

- Order Seisonidea
- Order Bdelloidea

- Class Monogononta

====== Phylum Gastrotricha ======
- Phylum Gastrotricha

- Order Macrodasyida
- Order Chaetonotida

- Suborder Multitubulatina
- Suborder Paucitubulatina

====== Phylum Kinorhyncha ======
- Phylum Kinorhyncha

- Order Cyclorhagida
- Order Homalorhagida

====== Phylum Nematoda (= Nemata) ======
- Phylum Nematoda (= Nemata)

- Class Adenophorea (= Aphasmida)

- Subclass Enoplia
- Subclass Chromadoria

- Class Secernentea (= Phasmida)

- Subclass Rhabditia
- Subclass Spiruria
- Subclass Diplogasteria

====== Phylum Nematomorpha ======
- Phylum Nematomorpha

- Order Nectonematoidea
- Order Gordioidea

====== Phylum Priapula ======
- Phylum Priapula

- Family Priapulidae
- Family Tubiluchidae
- Family Maccabeidae (= Chaetostephanidae)

====== Phylum Acanthocephala ======
- Phylum Acanthocephala

- Class Palaeacanthocephala
- Class Archiacanthocephala
- Class Eoacanthocephala

====== Phylum Entoprocta (= Kamptozoa) ======
- Phylum Entoprocta (= Kamptozoa)

- Family Loxosomatidae
- Family Loxokalypodidae
- Family Pedicellinidae
- Family Barentsiidae

====== Phylum Gnathostomulida ======
- Phylum Gnathostomulida

- Order Filospermoidea
- Order Bursovaginoidea

====== Phylum Loricifera ======
- Phylum Loricifera

- Order Nanaloricida

- Family Nanaloricidae
- Family Pliciloricidae

====== Phylum Cycliophora ======
- Phylum Cycliophora

- Symbion pandora

====== Phylum Annelida ======
- Phylum Annelida

- Class Polychaeta, with 25 orders and 87 families (not all are listed)

- Order Capitellida
- Order Chaetopterida
- Order Cirratulida
- Order Eunicida
- Order Myzostomida
- Order Opheliida
- Order Spionida
- Order Orbiniida
- Order Oweniida
- Order Phyllodocida
- Order Sabellida
- Order Terebellida

- Class Clitellata

- Subclass Oligochaeta

- Order Lumbriculida

- Family Lumbriculidae

- Order Moniligastrida

- Family Moniligastridae

- Order Haplotaxida, with 25 families (not all are listed)

- Family Almidae
- Family Megascolecidae
- Family Tubificidae
- Family Naididae
- Family Lumbricidae

- Subclass Hirudinoidea

- Order Acanthobdellida
- Order Branchiobdellida
- Order Hirudinida

====== Phylum Sipuncula ======
- Phylum Sipuncula

- Class Phascolosomida

- Order Aspidosiphoniformes
- Order Phascolosomiformes

- Class Sipunculida

- Order Golfingiaformes

- Family Themistidae
- Family Phascolionidae
- Family Golfingiidae

- Order Sipunculiformes

====== Phylum Echiura ======
- Phylum Echiura

- Order Echiuroinea
- Order Xenopneusta
- Order Heteromyota

====== Phylum Onychophora ======
- Phylum Onychophora

- Family Peripatidae
- Family Peripatopsidae

====== Phylum Tardigrada ======
- Phylum Tardigrada

- Order Heterotardigrada
- Order Mesotardigrada
- Order Eutardigrada

====== Phylum Arthropoda ======
- Phylum Arthropoda

- Subphylum Trilobitomorpha
- Subphylum Crustacea

- Class Remipedia
- Class Cephalocarida
- Class Branchiopoda

- Order Anostraca
- Order Notostraca
- Order Diplostraca

- Suborder Laevicaudata
- Suborder Spinicaudata
- Suborder Cyclestherida
- Suborder Cladocera

- Class Malacostraca

- Subclass Phyllocarida

- Order Lepstostraca

- Subclass Eumalacostraca

- Superorder Hoplocarida

- Order Stomatopoda

- Superorder Syncarida

- Order Bathynellacea
- Order Anaspidacea

- Superorder Eucarida

- Order Euphausiacea
- Order Amphionidacea
- Order Decapoda

- Suborder Dendrobranchiata
- Suborder Pleocyemata

- Infraorder Caridea
- Infraorder Stenopodidea
- Infraorder Brachyura
- Infraorder Anomura
- Infraorder Astacidea
- Infraorder Palinura
- Infraorder Thalassinidea

- Superorder Peracarida

- Order Mysida
- Order Lophogastrida
- Order Cumacea
- Order Tanaidacea
- Order Mictacea
- Order Spelaeogriphacea
- Order Thermosbaenacea
- Order Isopoda

- Suborder Anthuridea
- Suborder Asellota
- Suborder Calabozoidea
- Suborder Epicaridea
- Suborder Flabellifera
- Suborder Gnathiidea
- Suborder Oniscidea
- Suborder Phreatoicidea
- Suborder Valvifera

- Order Amphipoda

- Suborder Gammaridea
- Suborder Hyperiidea
- Suborder Caprellidea
- Suborder Ingolfiellidea

- Class Maxillopoda

- Subclass Thecostraca

- Infraclass Facetotecta
- Infraclass Ascothoracida
- Infraclass Cirripedia

- Superorder Acrothoracica
- Superorder Rhizocephala
- Superorder Thoracica

- Subclass Tantulocarida
- Subclass Branchiura
- Subclass Pentastomida
- Subclass Mystacocarida
- Subclass Copepoda

- Infraclass Progymnoplea

- Order Platycopioida

- Infraclass Neocopepoda

- Order Calanoida
- Order Cyclopoida
- Order Gelyelloida
- Order Harpacticoida
- Order Misophrioida
- Order Monstrilloida
- Order Mormonilloida
- Order Poecilostomatoida
- Order Siphonostomatoida

- Subclass Ostracoda

- Superorder Myodocopa

- Order Myodocopida
- Order Halocyprida

- Superorder Podocopa

- Order Podocopida
- Order Platycopida
- Order Palaeocopida

- Subphylum Hexapoda

- Class Entognatha

- Order Collembola
- Order Protura
- Order Diplura

- Class Insecta

- Subclass Archaeognatha

- Order Archaeognatha (= Microcoryphia)

- Subclass Zygentoma

- Order Thysanura

- Subclass Pterygota

- Infraclass Palaeoptera

- Order Ephemeroptera
- Order Odonata

- Infraclass Neoptera

- Order Plecoptera
- Order Blattodea
- Order Isoptera
- Order Mantodea
- Order Phasmida (= Phasmatoptera)
- Order Grylloblattodea
- Order Dermaptera
- Order Orthoptera
- Order Mantophasmatodea
- Order Embioptera
- Order Zoraptera
- Order Psocoptera
- Order Phthiraptera
- Order Thysanoptera
- Order Hemiptera
- Order Strepsiptera
- Order Megaloptera
- Order Raphidioptera
- Order Neuroptera
- Order Coleoptera
- Order Mecoptera
- Order Siphonaptera
- Order Diptera
- Order Trichoptera
- Order Lepidoptera
- Order Hymenoptera

- Subphylum Myriapoda

- Class Diplopoda

- Subclass Penicillata

- Order Polyxenida

- Subclass Chilognatha

- Order Callipodida
- Order Chordeumatida
- Order Glomerida
- Order Glomeridesmida
- Order Julida
- Order Platydesmida
- Order Polydesmida
- Order Polyzoniida
- Order Siphonophorida
- Order Siphoniulida
- Order Sphaerotheriida
- Order Spirobolida
- Order Spirostreptida
- Order Stemmiulida

- Class Chilopoda

- Subclass Notostigmophora

- Order Scutigeromorpha

- Subclass Pleurostigmophora

- Order Craterostigmomorpha
- Order Geophilomorpha
- Order Lithobiomorpha
- Order Scolopendromorpha

- Class Pauropoda
- Class Symphyla

- Subphylum Cheliceriformes

- Class Pycnogonida
- Class Chelicerata

- Subclass Merostomata

- Order Eurypterida
- Order Xiphosura

- Subclass Arachnida

- Order Acari

- Suborder Opiloacarifomes
- Suborder Parasitiformes
- Suborder Acariformes

- Order Amblypygi
- Order Araneae

- Suborder Mesothelae
- Suborder Opisthothelae

- Superfamily Mygalomorpha

- Family Ctenizidae
- Family Atypidae
- Family Theraphosidae
- Family Dipluridae

- Superfamily Araneomorphae

- Family Loxoscelidae
- Family Theridiidae
- Family Uloboridae
- Family Araneidae
- Family Tetragnathidae
- Family Clubionidae
- Family Linyphiidae
- Family Agelenidae
- Family Argyronetidae
- Family Lycosidae
- Family Pisauridae
- Family Oxyopidae
- Family Thomisidae
- Family Heteropodidae
- Family Salticidae
- Family Dinopidae
- Family Scytodidae

- Order Opiliones
- Order Palpigradi
- Order Pseudoscorpionida
- Order Ricinulei
- Order Schizomida
- Order Scorpiones
- Order Solpugida
- Order Uropygi

====== Phylum Mollusca ======
- Phylum Mollusca

- Class Aplacophora

- Subclass Chaetodermomorpha (= Caudofoveata)
- Subclass Neomeniomorpha (= Solenogastres)

- Class Monoplacophora
- Class Polyplacophora

- Order Lepidopleurida
- Order Ischnochitonida
- Order Acanthochitonida

- Class Gastropoda

- Subclass Prosobranchia

- Order Archaeogastropoda
- Order Mesogastropoda
- Order Neogastropoda

- Subclass Opisthobranchia

- Order Acochlidioidea
- Order Cephalaspidea
- Order Runcinoidea
- Order Sacoglossa
- Order Anaspidea
- Order Thecosomata
- Order Gymnosomata
- Order Notaspidea
- Order Nudibranchia

- Subclass Pulmonata

- Order Archaeopulmonata
- Order Basommatophora
- Order Stylommatophora
- Order Systellommatophora

- Class Bivalvia (=Pelecypoda, or Lamellibranchiata)

- Subclass Protobranchia

- Order Nuculida (= Palaeotaxodonta)
- Order Solemyida (= Cryptodonta)

- Subclass Lamellibranchia

- Superorder Filibranchia (= Pteriomorpha)
- Superorder Eulamellibranchia (= Heterodonta)

- Order Palaeoheterodonta
- Order Veneroida
- Order Myoida

- Subclass Anomalodesmata

- Class Scaphopoda
- Class Cephalopoda (= Siphonopoda)

- Subclass Nautiloidea (= Tetrabranchiata)
- Subclass Coleoidea (= Dibranchiata)

- Order Sepioida
- Order Teuthoida (= Decapoda)
- Order Octopoda
- Order Vampyromorpha

====== Phylum Phoronida ======
- Phylum Phoronida

====== Phylum Ectoprocta (= Bryozoa) ======
- Phylum Ectoprocta (= Bryozoa)

- Class Phylactolaemata
- Class Stenolaemata
- Class Gymnolaemata

- Order Ctenostomata
- Order Cheilostomata

====== Phylum Brachiopoda ======
- Phylum Brachiopoda

- Class Inarticulata
- Class Articulata

====== Phylum Echinodermata ======
- Phylum Echinodermata

- Class Crinoidea
- Class Asteroidea

- Order Platysterida
- Order Paxillosida
- Order Valvatida
- Order Spinulosida
- Order Forcipulatida

- ”Sea daisies” (previously the class Concentricycloidea, but assigned by many authorities to the Spinulosida)
- Class Ophiuroidea

- Order Oegophiurida
- Order Phrynophiurida
- Order Ophiurida

- Class Echinoidea

- Subclass Cidaroidea
- Subclass Euechinoidea

- Infraclass Echinothurioida
- Infraclass Acroechinoidea

- Cohort Diadematacea
- Cohort Echinacea
- Cohort Irregularia

- Class Holothuroidea

- Subclass Dendrochirotacea

- Order Dactylochirotida
- Order Dendrochirotida

- Subclass Aspidochirotacea

- Order Aspidochirotida
- Order Elasipodida

- Subclass Apodacea

- Order Molpadida
- Order Apodida

====== Phylum Chaetognatha ======
- Phylum Chaetognatha

- Order Phragmophora
- Order Aphragmophora

====== Phylum Hemichordata ======
- Phylum Hemichordata

- Class Enteropneusta
- Class Pterobranchia
- Class Planctosphaeroidea

====== Phylum Chordata ======
- Phylum Chordata

- Subphylum Urochordata (= Tunicata)

- Class Ascidiacea
- Class Thaliacea
- Class Appendicularia (= Larvacea)
- Class Sorberacea

- Subphylum Cephalochordata (= Acrania)
- Subphylum Vertebrata

- Class Myxini
- Class Cephalaspidomorphi
- Class Chondrichthyes
- Class Osteichthyes
- Class Amphibia
- Class Reptiliomorpha (= Sauropsida)
- Class Mammalia

== See also ==
- Taxonomy of the Gastropoda (Bouchet et al., 2017)
- Taxonomy of the Gastropoda (Bouchet & Rocroi, 2005) – System for the scientific classification of gastropod mollusks
- Taxonomy of the Gastropoda (Ponder & Lindberg, 1997) – Morphological system for the scientific classification of gastropod mollusks
- Taxonomy of the Conoidea (Tucker & Tenorio, 2009) – Classification of cone snails and allies
- Taxonomy of the Lepidoptera – Classification of moths and butterflies
