= Speleophria bivexilla =

Conservation status
- Critically Endangered (IUCN 2.3)

Scientific classification
- Kingdom: Animalia
- Phylum: Arthropoda
- Class: Copepoda
- Order: Misophrioida
- Family: Speleophriidae
- Genus: Speleophria
- Species: S. bivexilla

Binomial name
- Speleophria bivexilla Boxshall & Iliffe, 1986

Species of crustacean

Speleophria bivexilla is a species of copepod in the family Speleophriidae. It is endemic to Bermuda.
