= Speleophria scottodicarloi =

Conservation status
- Critically Endangered (IUCN 2.3)

Scientific classification
- Kingdom: Animalia
- Phylum: Arthropoda
- Clade: Pancrustacea
- Class: Copepoda
- Order: Misophrioida
- Family: Speleophriidae
- Genus: Speleophria
- Species: S. scottodicarloi

Binomial name
- Speleophria scottodicarloi Boxshall & Iliffe, 1990

Species of crustacean

Speleophria scottodicarloi is a species of crustacean in the family Speleophriidae. It is endemic to Chalk Cave, a collapsed cave in Smith's Parish, Bermuda, and it listed as critically endangered on the IUCN Red List. The pool it inhabits also contains Barbouria cubensis, Somersiella sterreri and Paracyclopia naessi.
