= Speleophria =

Scientific classification
- Domain: Eukaryota
- Kingdom: Animalia
- Phylum: Arthropoda
- Class: Copepoda
- Order: Misophrioida
- Family: Speleophriidae
- Genus: Speleophria; Boxshall & Iliffe, 1986

Genus of crustaceans

Speleophria is a genus of marine copepods in the family Speleophriidae. It contains the following species:

- Speleophria bivexilla Boxshall & Iliffe, 1986
- Speleophria bunderae Jaume, Boxshall & Humphreys, 2001
- Speleophria campaneri Boxshall & Iliffe, 1990
- Speleophria gymnesica Jaume & Boxshall, 1996
- Speleophria mestrovi Krisnic, 2008
- Speleophria nullarborensis Karanovic & Eberhard, 2009
- Speleophria scottodicarloi Boxshall & Iliffe, 1990
