= Longipedia =

Scientific classification
- Kingdom: Animalia
- Phylum: Arthropoda
- Class: Copepoda
- Order: Polyarthra
- Family: Longipediidae
- Genus: Longipedia; Claus, 1862

Type species
- Longipedia coronata Claus, 1863

Genus of crustaceans

Longipedia is a genus of marine copepods of the family Longipediidae, order Canuelloida.

The genus Longipedia comprises 23 accepted species and is distributed worldwide. The Longipediidae generally are long and missile shaped, with segmented bodies covered by hard chitin. Longipedia utilize thoracopods to move, pulling themselves through the water. Distinctive features of Longipedia species are an elongated P2 endopod; and a tooth on the P2 endopod third segment. Identification and differentiation between Longipedia species can be difficult due to morphological similarities among species.

== Phylogeny ==
Until recently the family Longipediidae was classified in the section Polyarthra of Harpacticoida. The morphological differences of the Polyarthra from the other Harpacticoids have also been identified as a reason for separation of Polyarthra from the other Harpacticoids.

== Distribution ==
The Longipediidae are located throughout the world in brackish and marine waters. Most frequently they have been identified in shallow marine habitats with sandy or muddy sediments. They have also been identified on macroalgae, in seagrass beds and in marine plankton. Recently a new species of Longipedia has been identified in samples from a Caribbean mesophotic coral reef. This species is unusual because the depth at which it was found is not typical of other Longipedia species, suggesting that the range of habitats supporting Longipediidae may be greater than previously understood.

== Growth and development ==
Like other copepods, Longipedia larvae have a planktonic naupliar larval stage, and through molting go through six stages to become copepodites. Once larva metamorphose to the copepodite form, they continue to molt in five stages, adding complexity and size over time. As nauplius, planktonic Longipedia have good swimming abilities. As copepodites, they remain close to a substratum.

== Habitat and behavior ==
Longipedia species are benthic or hyperbenthic filter feeders. In the Mediterranean, various Longipedia species were identified as detrital feeders, while others were identified as phytophile. Longipedia species are preyed upon by small fish and corals.

In seagrass beds they are more abundant in the intertidal zone, in the top few centimeters of substrate. In Costa Rica, Longipedia were found on the Caribbean coastline. In the mesophotic reef, the newly discovered species was collected with coral, but the sample also included substrate, so the specific habitat of the species and role in the ecosystem was not identifiable.

In a study analyzing sediments and stomach contents of small fish in the North Sea, it has been noted that a species of Longipedia constituted the majority of the biomass in the sediments during the summer months. This increase was attributed to the increase in phytoplankton in sediment following the spring bloom, providing ample food to the copepods, and the copepod breeding activities.
