= Canuellidae =

Scientific classification
- Domain: Eukaryota
- Kingdom: Animalia
- Phylum: Arthropoda
- Class: Copepoda
- Order: Polyarthra
- Family: Canuellidae; Lang, 1944

Family of crustaceans

Canuellidae is a family of copepods belonging to the order Polyarthra.

== Genera ==
The family contains the following genera:

- Brianola Monard, 1926
- Canuella Scott T. & Scott A., 1893
- Canuellina Gurney, 1927
- Canuellopsis Lang, 1936
- Coullana Por, 1984
- Echinosunaristes Huys, 1995
- Elanella Por, 1984
- Ellucana Coull, 1971
- Galapacanuella Mielke, 1979
- Ifanella Vervoort, 1964
- Indicanuella Por, 1984
- Indocanuella Huys, 2016
- Intercanuella Becker & Schriever, 1979
- Intersunaristes Huys, 1995
- Microcanuella Mielke, 1994
- Nathaniella Por, 1984
- Parasunaristes Fiers, 1982
- Scottolana Huys, 2009
- Sunaristes Hesse, 1867
