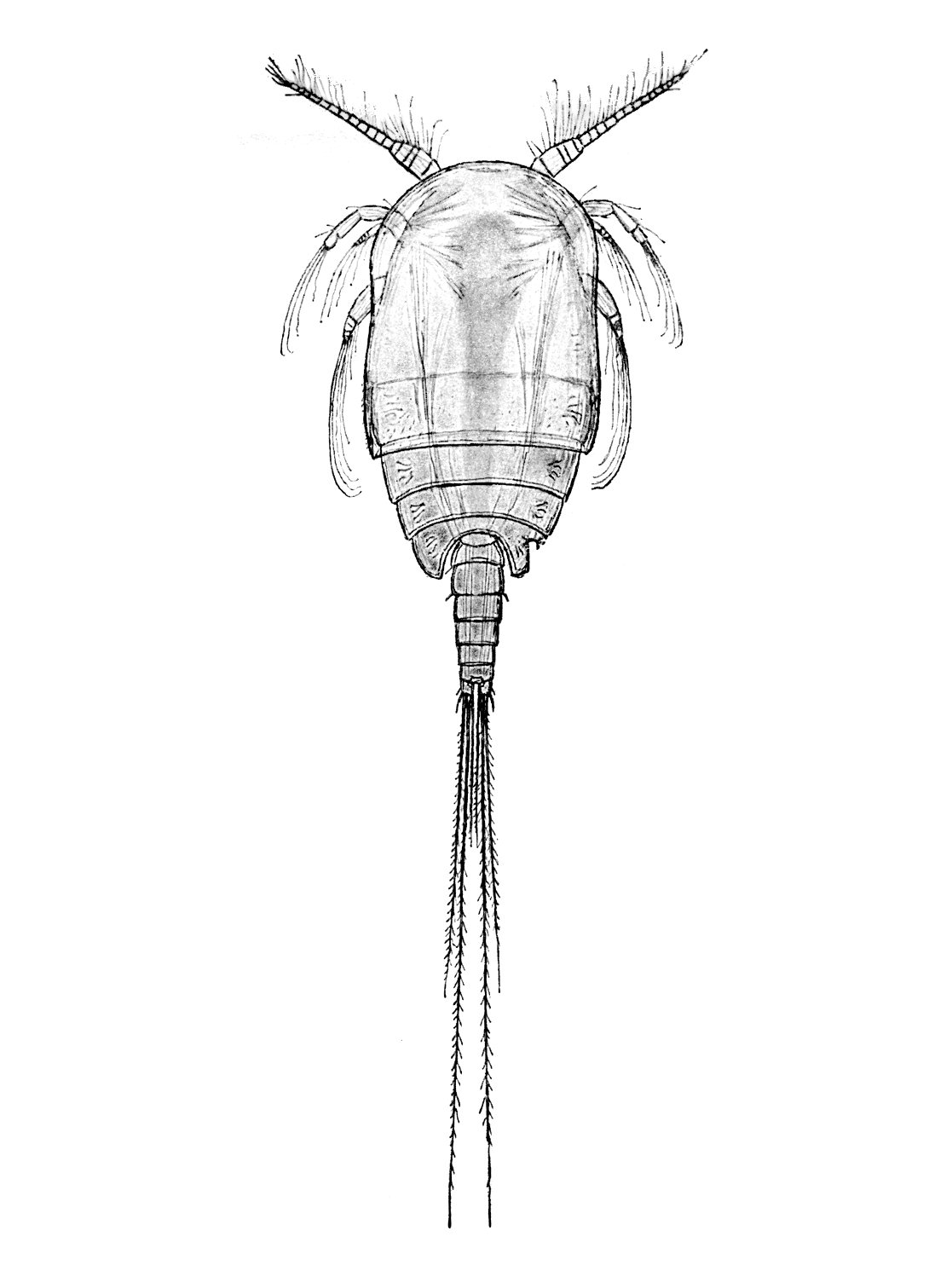
- Benthomisophria palliata

Scientific classification
- Domain: Eukaryota
- Kingdom: Animalia
- Phylum: Arthropoda
- Class: Copepoda
- Order: Misophrioida
- Family: Misophriidae; Brady, 1878

= Misophriidae =

Family of crustaceans

Misophriidae is a family of copepods belonging to the order Misophrioida.

Genera:

- Arcticomisophria Martínez Arbizu & Seifried, 1996
- Benthomisophria Sars, 1909
- Dimisophria Boxshall & Iliffe, 1987
- Fosshageniella Jaume & Boxshall, 1997
- Misophria Boeck, 1865
- Misophriella Boxshall, 1983
- Misophriopsis Boxshall, 1983
- Stygomisophria Ohtsuka, Huys, Boxshall & Ito, 1992
