= Longipediidae =

Scientific classification
- Domain: Eukaryota
- Kingdom: Animalia
- Phylum: Arthropoda
- Class: Copepoda
- Order: Polyarthra
- Family: Longipediidae; Boeck, 1865

Family of crustaceans

Longipediidae is a family of copepods belonging to the order Polyarthra. It contains a single genus.

Genera:

- Longipedia Claus, 1863
