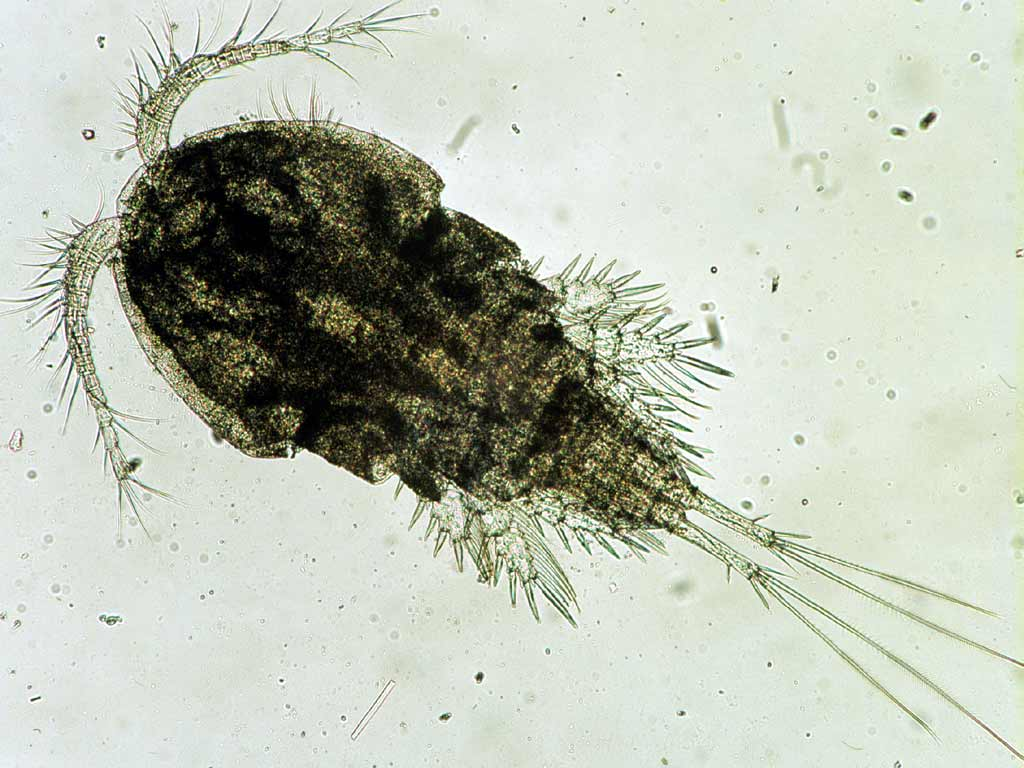
- Cyclops sp. (Cyclopoida)

Scientific classification
- Kingdom: Animalia
- Phylum: Arthropoda
- Clade: Pancrustacea
- Class: Copepoda
- Infraclass: Neocopepoda
- Superorder: Podoplea; Giesbrecht, 1882

Orders
- See text

Synonyms
- Rhabdomoplea Khodami et al., 2019

= Podoplea =

Superorder of copepods

Podoplea is a superorder of copepods in the infraclass Neocopepoda that was named by Wilhelm Giesbrecht in 1882. It has a worldwide distribution, with documented appearances in the Arctic, Atlantic, Indian, Pacific, and Southern oceans.

== Classification ==
Podoplea contains 8 orders. They are listed below.

- Order Cyclopoida Burmeister, 1834
- Order Gelyelloida Huys, 1988
- Order Harpacticoida G. O. Sars, 1903
- Order Misophrioida Gurney, 1933
- Order Monstrilloida Sars, 1901
- Order Mormonilloida Boxshall, 1979
- Order Polyarthra Lang, 1944 (=Canuelloida Khodami, Vaun MacArthur, Blanco-Bercial & Martinez Arbizu, 2017 )
- Order Siphonostomatoida Thorell, 1859
