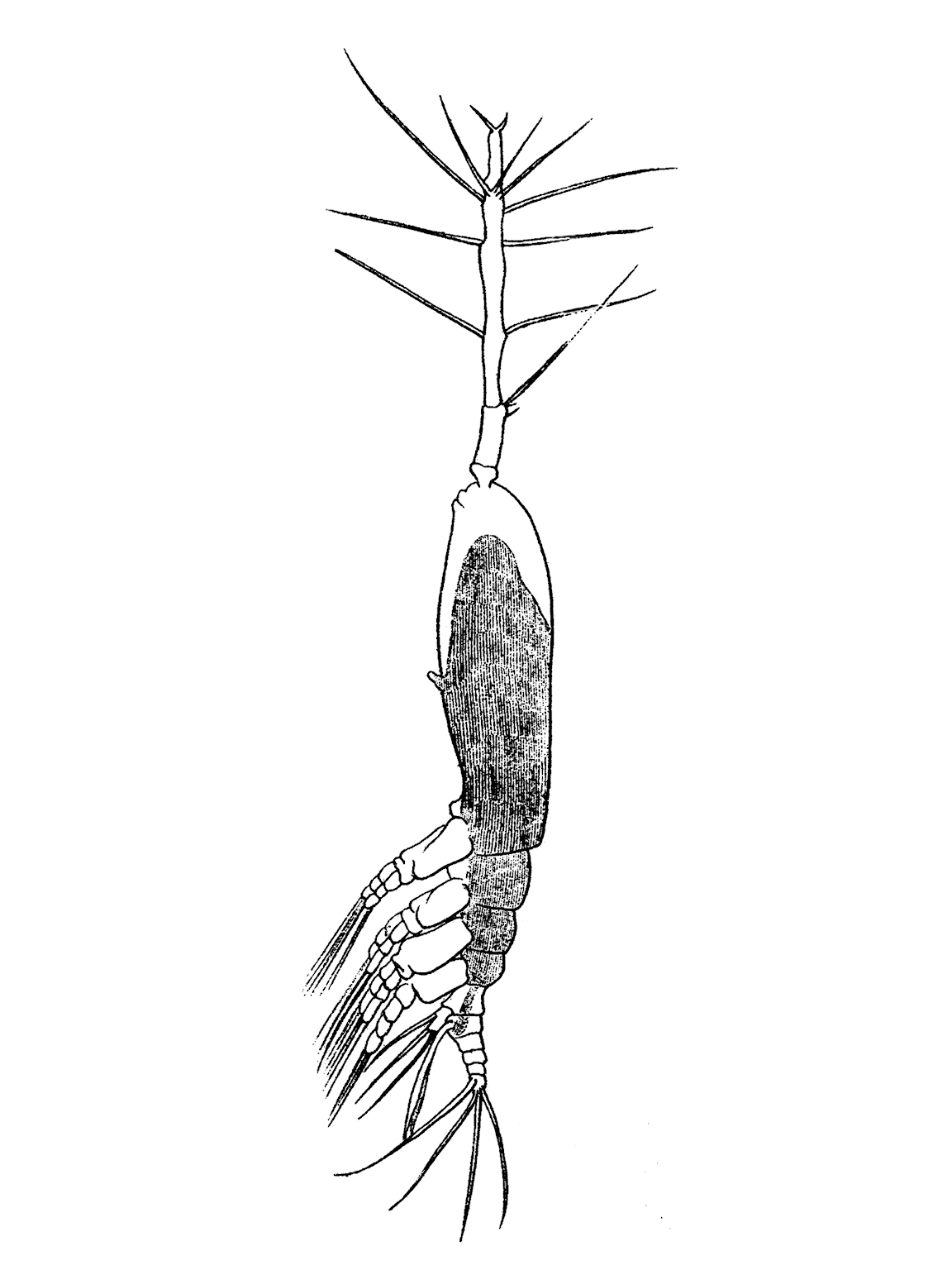

Scientific classification
- Domain: Eukaryota
- Kingdom: Animalia
- Phylum: Arthropoda
- Class: Copepoda
- Order: Monstrilloida
- Family: Monstrillidae
- Genus: Monstrilla; Dana, 1849

Species
- Monstrilla ilhoii; Monstrilla longiremis; Monstrilla viridis Dana, 1849 (type)

Synonyms
- List: Haemocera Malaquin, 1896; Strilloma Grygier & Suárez-Morlaes, 2018; Thaumaleus Krøyer, 1849; Thaumatoessia Krøyer, 1845; Thaumatoessa Hesse, 1868; Thaumatohessia Giard, 1900

= Monstrilla =

Genus of crustaceans

Monstrilla is a genus of copepods in the family Monstrillidae.
