= Richard Brusca =

American biologist

Richard Charles Brusca
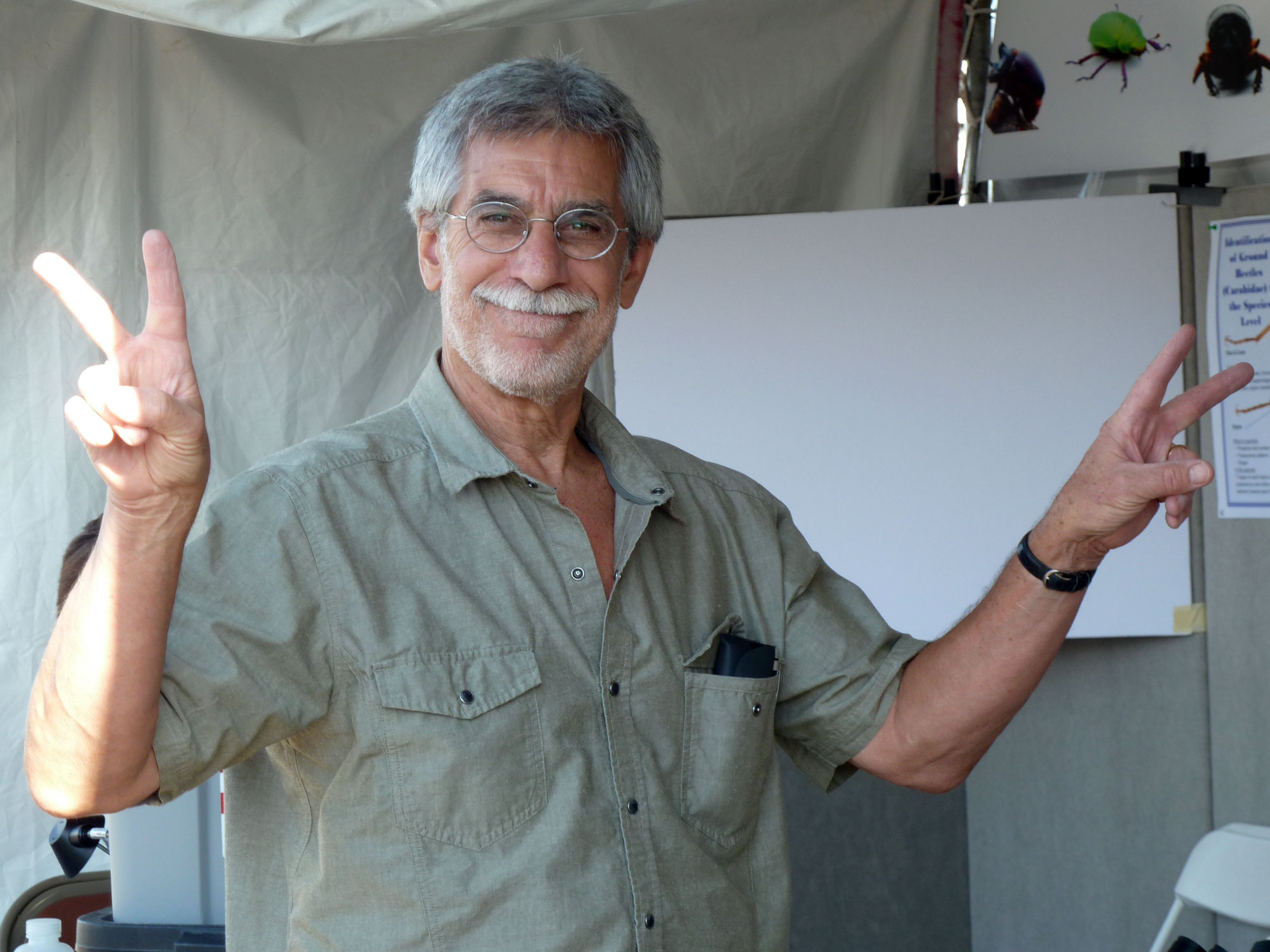
- Born: 1945 (age 80–81)
- Occupations: Invertebrate zoologist, marine biologist, conservation ecologist, and cultural anthropologist

Academic background
- Education: B.S. M.S. Ph.D.
- Alma mater: California State Polytechnic University; California State University, Los Angeles; University of Arizona

Academic work
- Institutions: University of Arizona; Arizona-Sonora Desert Museum

Richard Charles Brusca (born 1945) is an American invertebrate zoologist, marine biologist, conservation ecologist, and cultural anthropologist. He is executive director emeritus of the Arizona-Sonora Desert Museum and a designated campus colleague at the University of Arizona.

Brusca's research has focused on the ecology and biodiversity of desert and marine environments, particularly the Sonoran Desert, the Gulf of California, and the Madrean Sky Islands of southern Arizona and northern Mexico. He is an elected fellow of the American Association for the Advancement of Science (AAAS), and the California Academy of Sciences.

== Education ==
Brusca completed his Bachelor's degree in 1967 at California State Polytechnic University. In 1970, he completed a Master's from California State University, Los Angeles. Additionally, he completed his Ph.D. in 1975 from the University of Arizona.

== Career ==
In 1975, Brusca joined the University of Southern California, where he worked as an assistant and associate professor of biology as well as the curator of Crustacea for the Department of Biological Sciences and Allan Hancock Foundation. In 1981, he became director of Academic Programs at the University of Southern California's (U.S.C.) Catalina Marine Science Center. In 1984, he was appointed head of the Invertebrate Zoology Section at the Los Angeles County Museum of Natural History. From 1987 to 1993, he was the Joshua L Bailly Chair and Curator of the Invertebrate Zoology Department at the San Diego Natural History Museum. From 1993 to 1998, he worked as a full professor of Biology and director of the Graduate Program in Marine Biology at the College of Charleston. Between 2001 and 2012, he also worked at the Arizona-Sonora Museum, where he was senior director of Conservation and Science from 2001 to 2012 and director of the Arizona-Sonora Museum Press from 2002 to 2012. He was also its executive director from 2003 to 2009. Since 2012, he has been executive director emeritus and research associate at Arizona-Sonora Desert Museum. He was a research scientist at the University of Arizona's Department of Ecology & Evolutionary Biology between 1998 and 2024, whereupon, after retirement, he became a designated campus colleague.

Brusca is also a National Geographic Explorer. He has been an editorial contributor to the Mexico City newspaper El Universal and the Arizona newspaper Arizona Daily Star. He is also the author of novels In the Land of the Feathered Serpent and The Time Travelers.

== Research ==
Brusca's primary research interests include the natural history of the Sonoran Desert and the Gulf of California, the biodiversity of the Madrean Sky Islands, and invertebrate zoology. His work has also addressed themes in cultural anthropology, particularly through his examination of the relationship between biodiversity and linguistic diversity in Mexico. His studies have examined the impacts of climate change in the southwestern United States, particularly in the Sky Island regions, and contributed to the higher classification of animals through his work on invertebrate taxonomy and systematics. In Invertebrates, he discussed each of the currently recognized phyla, providing classifications, revised taxonomic synopses, updated information on general biology and anatomy, and current phylogenetic hypotheses. Judith Winston, in her review, described the book as successful, remarking that "one of the consequences has been its adoption as a standard desk reference for professionals and students". However, she also pointed out "typological errors and the differences in comprehension between chapters". Moreover, he has authored several field guides, including Common Intertidal Invertebrates of the Gulf of California, A Seashore Guide to the Northern Gulf of California, and A Natural History of the Santa Catalina Mountains, with an Introduction to the Madrean Sky Islands, the latter of which was selected as one of the Southwest Books of the Year in 2013.

== Awards and honors ==
- 1965 – Civilian Service Medal, U.S. Department of Defense
- 2001 – Elected Fellow, American Association for the Advancement of Science (AAAS)
- 2014 – Elected Fellow, California Academy of Sciences

== Bibliography ==
=== Selected books ===
- Brusca, Richard C. (1980). Common intertidal invertebrates of the Gulf of California (2nd ed.). University of Arizona Press. ISBN 978-0-8165-0682-8.
- Brusca, Richard C.; Brusca, Gary J. (1990). Invertebrates (2nd ed.). Sinauer Associates. ISBN 978-0-87893-098-2.
- Brusca, Richard C. (2010). The Gulf of California: biodiversity and conservation (Online-Ausg. ed.). University of Arizona Press. ISBN 978-0-8165-0275-2.
- Brusca, Richard C. (2013). A natural history of the Santa Catalina Mountains, Arizona, with an introduction to the Madrean Sky Islands. Arizona-Sonora Desert Museum Press. ISBN 978-1-886679-48-1.
- Brusca, Richard C.; Giribet, Gonzalo; Moore, Wendy (2023). Invertebrates (Fourth ed.). Oxford University Press. ISBN 978-0-19-755441-8.
- Brusca, Richard C. (2025). The divide between humanities and science: why it matters and how it can be repaired. Ethics International Press Limited. ISBN 978-1-83711-013-1.

=== Selected articles ===
- Rinehart, K. L.; Shaw, P. D.; Shield, L. S.; Gloer, J. B.; Harbour, G. C.; Koker, M. E. S.; Samain, D.; Schwartz, R. E.; Tymiak, A. A.; Weller, D. L.; Carter, G. T.; Munro, M. H. G.; Hughes, R. G.; Renis, H. E.; Swynenberg, E. B.; Stringfellow, D. A.; Vavra, J. J.; Coats, J. H.; Zurenko, G. E.; Kuentzel, S. L.; Li, L. H.; Bakus, G. J.; Brusca, R. C.; Craft, L. L.; Young, D. N.; Connor, J. L. (1981). "Marine natural products as sources of antiviral, antimicrobial, and antineoplastic agents". Pure and Applied Chemistry. 53 (4): 795–817. Bibcode:1981PApCh..53..795R. doi:10.1351/pac198153040795.
- Brusca, Richard C. (1981). "A monograph on the Isopoda Cymothoidae (Crustacea) of the eastern Pacific". Zoological Journal of the Linnean Society. 73 (2): 117–199. doi:10.1111/j.1096-3642.1981.tb01592.x.
- Lluch-Cota, Salvador E.; Aragón-Noriega, Eugenio A.; Arreguín-Sánchez, Francisco; Aurioles-Gamboa, David; Bautista-Romero, J. Jesús; Brusca, Richard C.; Cervantes-Duarte, Rafael; Cortés-Altamirano, Roberto; Del-Monte-Luna, Pablo; Esquivel-Herrera, Alfonso; Fernández, Guillermo; Hendrickx, Michel E.; Hernández-Vázquez, Sergio; Herrera-Cervantes, Hugo; Kahru, Mati; Lavín, Miguel; Lluch-Belda, Daniel; Lluch-Cota, Daniel B.; López-Martínez, Juana; Marinone, Silvio G.; Nevárez-Martínez, Manuel O.; Ortega-García, Sofia; Palacios-Castro, Eduardo; Parés-Sierra, Alejandro; Ponce-Díaz, Germán; Ramírez-Rodríguez, Mauricio; Salinas-Zavala, Cesar A.; Schwartzlose, Richard A.; Sierra-Beltrán, Arturo P. (2007). "The Gulf of California: Review of ecosystem status and sustainability challenges". Progress in Oceanography. 73 (1): 1–26. Bibcode:2007PrOce..73....1L. doi:10.1016/j.pocean.2007.01.013.
- Ruggiero, Michael A.; Gordon, Dennis P.; Orrell, Thomas M.; Bailly, Nicolas; Bourgoin, Thierry; Brusca, Richard C.; Cavalier-Smith, Thomas; Guiry, Michael D.; Kirk, Paul M. (2015). "A Higher Level Classification of All Living Organisms". PLOS ONE. 10 (4) e0119248. Bibcode:2015PLoSO..1019248R. doi:10.1371/journal.pone.0119248. PMC 4418965. PMID 25923521.
- Osland, Michael J.; Stevens, Philip W.; Lamont, Margaret M.; Brusca, Richard C.; Hart, Kristen M.; Waddle, J. Hardin; Langtimm, Catherine A.; Williams, Caroline M.; Keim, Barry D.; Terando, Adam J.; Reyier, Eric A.; Marshall, Katie E.; Loik, Michael E.; Boucek, Ross E.; Lewis, Amanda B.; Seminoff, Jeffrey A. (2021). "Tropicalization of temperate ecosystems in North America: The northward range expansion of tropical organisms in response to warming winter temperatures". Global Change Biology. 27 (13): 3009–3034. Bibcode:2021GCBio..27.3009O. doi:10.1111/gcb.15563. PMID 33605004.
