= Palpophria =

Scientific classification
- Domain: Eukaryota
- Kingdom: Animalia
- Phylum: Arthropoda
- Class: Copepoda
- Order: Misophrioida
- Family: Palpophriidae; Boxshall & Jaume, 2000
- Genus: Palpophria; Boxshall & Iliffe, 1987
- Species: P. aestheta

Binomial name
- Palpophria aestheta Boxshall & Iliffe, 1987

Genus of crustaceans

Palpophria is a monotypic genus of crustaceans belonging to the monotypic family Palpophriidae. The only species is Palpophria aestheta.
