= Clemelis pullata =

Scientific classification
- Kingdom: Animalia
- Phylum: Arthropoda
- Class: Insecta
- Order: Diptera
- Family: Tachinidae
- Subfamily: Exoristinae
- Tribe: Goniini
- Genus: Clemelis
- Species: C. pullata

Binomial name
- Clemelis pullata (Meigen, 1824)

Synonyms
- Tachina pullata Meigen, 1824; Clemelis aurea Robineau-Desvoidy, 1863; Clemelis oblimata Mesnil, 1954; Phorocera aurulenta Perris, 1852; Phorocera lata Perris, 1852; Phorocera polleniella Rondani, 1859; Tachina dalecarlica Zetterstedt, 1859; Tachina mundula Zetterstedt, 1844; Tachina vibrissata Zetterstedt, 1838; Tritochaeta prosopoides Brauer & von Berganstamm, 1889; Zenillia ciligera Robineau-Desvoidy, 1830; Zenillia lubrica Robineau-Desvoidy, 1863

Species of fly

Clemelis pullata is a species of fly in the family Tachinidae. This family consists of dipteran tachina flies, which are protelean parasitoids of arthropods.

This species (previously called Zenillia pullata) is said to have the world's smallest insect eggs, with dimensions of 0.027 by 0.02 mm (about 8 nanograms).

== Distribution ==
British Isles, Czech Republic, Hungary, Moldova, Poland, Romania, Slovakia, Ukraine, Denmark, Finland, Sweden, Bosnia and Herzegovina, Bulgaria, Croatia, Cyprus, Greece, Italy, Macedonia, Malta, Portugal, Serbia, Slovenia, Spain, Turkey, Austria, Belgium, France, Germany, Switzerland, Israel, China, Mongolia, Morocco, Russia, Armenia.
