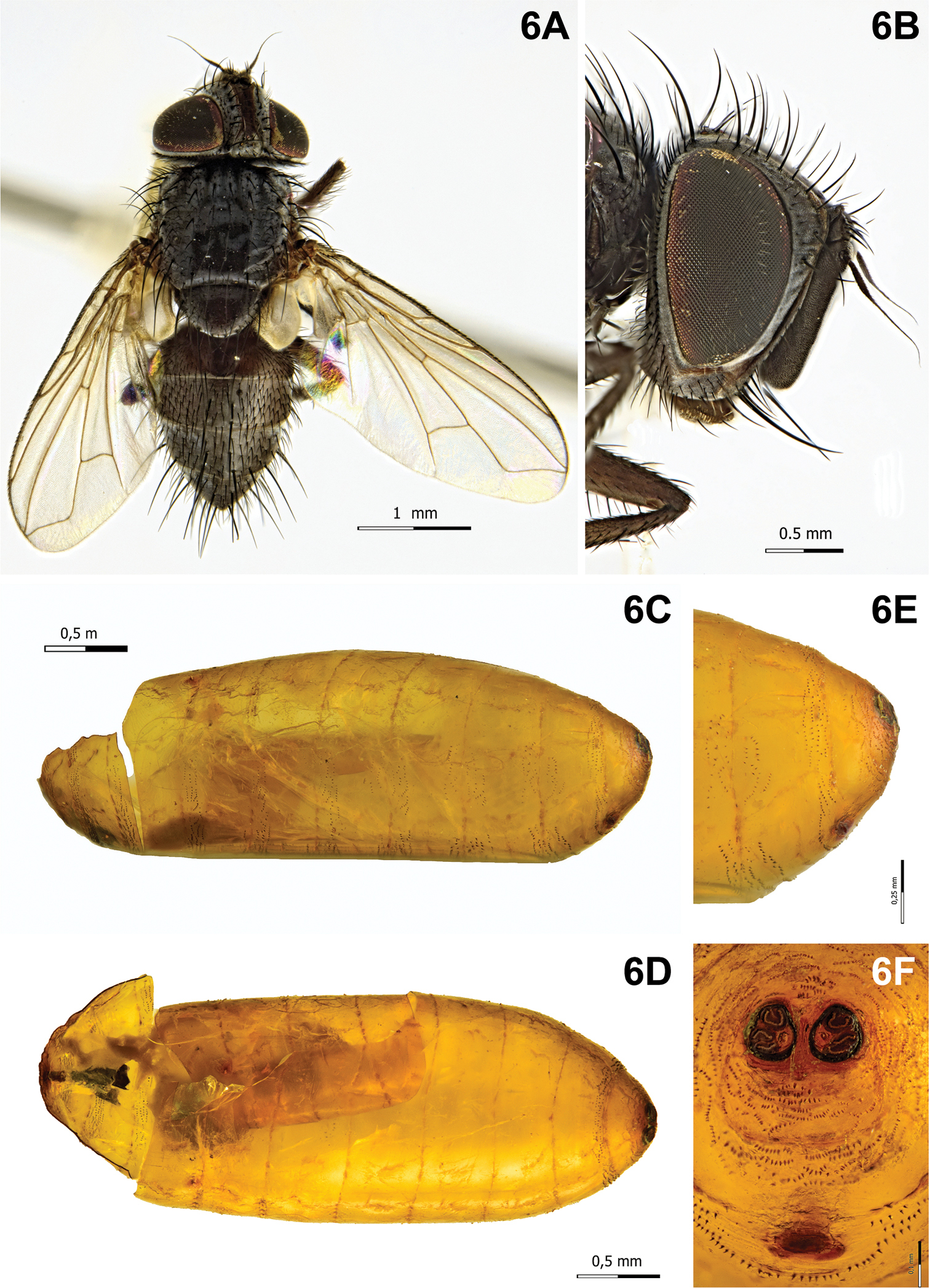
- Clemelis massilia

Scientific classification
- Kingdom: Animalia
- Phylum: Arthropoda
- Class: Insecta
- Order: Diptera
- Family: Tachinidae
- Subfamily: Exoristinae
- Tribe: Goniini
- Genus: Clemelis; Robineau-Desvoidy, 1863

Type species
- Zenillia ciligera Robineau-Desvoidy, 1830

Synonyms
- Tritochaeta Brauer & von Berganstamm, 1889

= Clemelis =

Genus of flies

Clemelis is a genus of flies in the family Tachinidae.

== Species ==
- Clemelis apicalis Villeneuve, 1923
- Clemelis atricans Herting, 1975
- Clemelis delicatula Mesnil, 1970
- Clemelis gymnops Herting, 1975
- Clemelis jingentaoi Zhng & Hao, 2022
- Clemelis majuscula Mesnil, 1954
- Clemelis massilia Herting, 1977
- Clemelis pullata (Meigen, 1824)
- Clemelis pullula (Townsend, 1915)
