= Tetrabranchiata =

Subclass of molluscs

The Tetrabranchiata are members of a now discontinued taxonomic order of cephalopod, whose bodyplan included four gills, four hearts, four kidneys, and an external shell, today represented only by the nautilus. They were placed in opposition to the Dibranchiata, those cephalopods with only two gills, three hearts, two kidneys, and no external shell. The distinction was eventually proven to be erroneous.
