= Ischnochitonida =

Scientific classification
- Domain: Eukaryota
- Kingdom: Animalia
- Phylum: Mollusca
- Class: Polyplacophora
- Order: Ischnochitonida

Order of molluscs

Ischnochitonida is an order of molluscs belonging to the class Polyplacophora.

Families:

- Callistoplacidae Pilsbry, 1893
- Callochitonidae Plate, 1901
- Chaetopleuridae Plate, 1899
- Chitonidae Rafinesque, 1815
- †Gryphochitonidae
- Ischnochitonidae Dall, 1889
- Loricidae Iredale & Hull, 1923
- Mopaliidae Dall, 1889
- †Ochmazochitonidae
- Schizochitonidae Dall, 1889
- Schizoplacidae Bergenhayn, 1955
- Subterenochitonidae
- Tonicellidae Simroth, 1894
