= Protelean =

Class of parasitic organisms

Protelean organisms are widely regarded as a special class of parasites, often referred to as parasitoids. Protelean parasites refer to insects that begin the juvenile phase of their lives as parasites and ultimately destroy or consume their host to emerge as free-living adults. Defining attributes of Protelean parasitoids include a parasitic nature that is confined to the larval stage, destruction of a single host, and an independent mature stage. Other distinguishing characteristics include a body size similar to its host and a comparatively simple life style. Parasitoids and their hosts are typically in the same taxonomic class.

== Examples ==
The most typical examples of such organisms are the parasitoidal Hymenoptera, Diptera, and some other insects, as well as the copepod Monstrilloida. Usually such insects are holometabolous, which preadapts them for such a life history because it implies that their larval stage of life is distinct from the adult stage.

There are however many other ranges of protelean organisms, such as early instars of certain species of mites that attack other Arthropoda. Allothrombium pulvinium, more commonly referred to as the velvet mite, is an example of a protelean parasite that infects aphids in its larval stage. The larvae are ectoparasitic, while the deutonymphs and mature mites are independent, with the mature adults ultimately becoming predators of aphids.
