= Speleophriidae =

Scientific classification
- Kingdom: Animalia
- Phylum: Arthropoda
- Clade: Pancrustacea
- Class: Copepoda
- Order: Misophrioida
- Family: Speleophriidae; Boxshall & Jaume, 2000

Family of crustaceans

Speleophriidae is a family of copepods, comprising seven genera. All are restricted to anchialine caves, with the exception of Archimisophria, which is found in the hyperbenthos of the depths of the Atlantic Ocean. The genera are:

- Archimisophria Boxshall, 1983
- Boxshallia Huys, 1988
- Expansophria Boxshall & Iliffe, 1987
- Huysia Jaume, Boxshall & Iliffe, 1998
- Mexicophria Boxshall, Zylinski, Jaume, Iliffe & Suárez-Morales, 2014
- Protospeleophria Jaume, Boxshall & Iliffe, 1998
- Speleophria Boxshall & Iliffe, 1986
- Speleophriopsis Jaume & Boxshall, 1996
