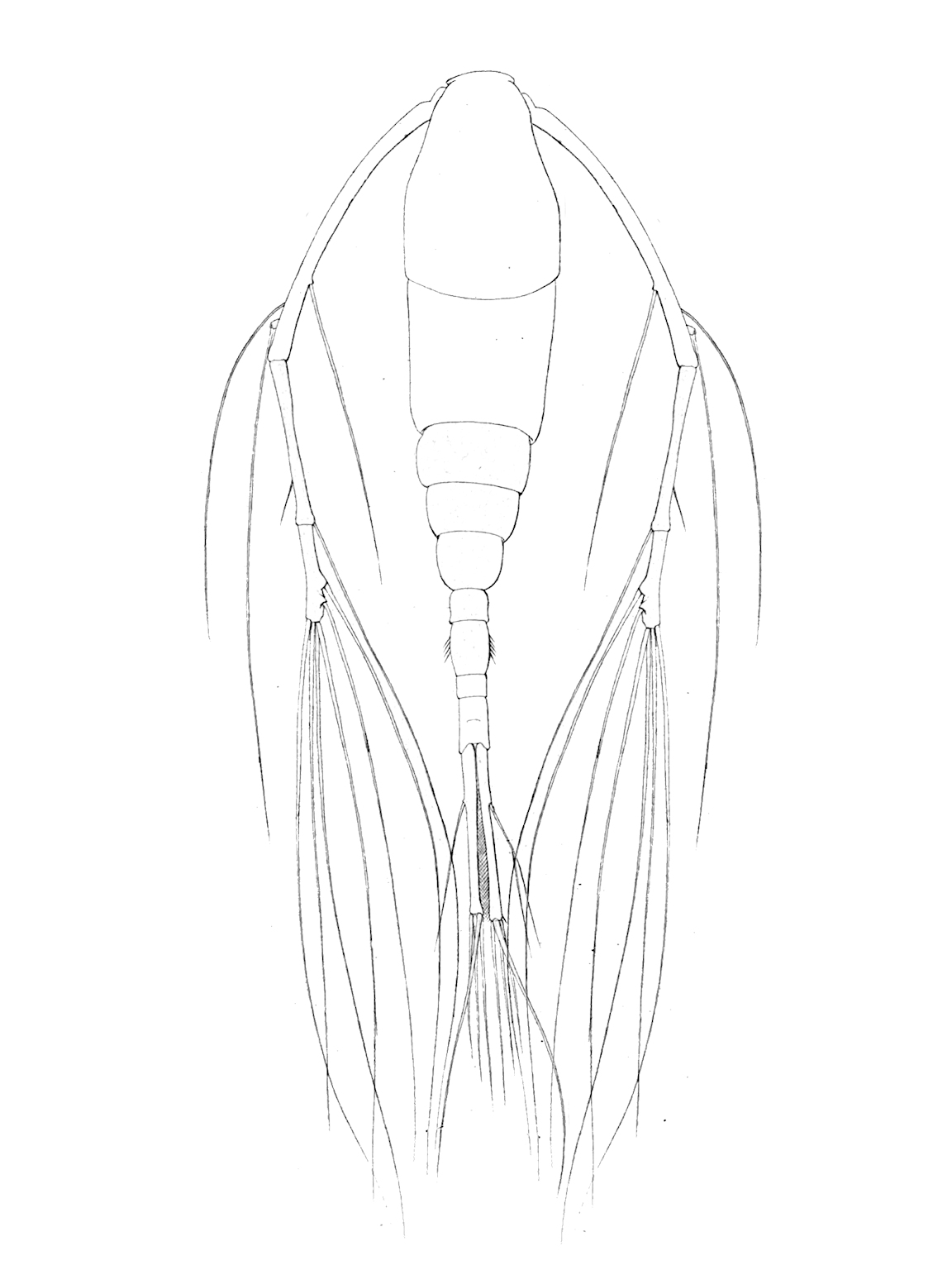
- Mormonilla phasma

Scientific classification
- Kingdom: Animalia
- Phylum: Arthropoda
- Clade: Pancrustacea
- Class: Copepoda
- Infraclass: Neocopepoda
- Superorder: Podoplea
- Order: Mormonilloida; Boxshall, 1979
- Family: Mormonillidae; Giesbrecht, 1893

= Mormonillidae =

Family of crustaceans

Mormonillidae is a family of planktonic marine copepods, the only member of the order Mormonilloida. There are five known species in two genera:

- Mormonilla Giesbrecht, 1891

- Mormonilla atlantica Wolfenden, 1905
- Mormonilla phasma Giesbrecht, 1891

- Neomormonilla Ivanenko & Defaye, 2006

- Neomormonilla extremata Ivanenko & Defaye, 2006
- Neomormonilla minor (Giesbrecht, 1891)
- Neomormonilla polaris (G. O. Sars, 1900)
