= Polyarthra (crustacean) =

Scientific classification
- Kingdom: Animalia
- Phylum: Arthropoda
- Class: Copepoda
- Infraclass: Neocopepoda
- Superorder: Podoplea
- Order: Polyarthra; Lang, 1944

Order of crustaceans

Polyarthra, officially known as Canuelloida, is an order of copepods.

== Taxonomy ==
There are two families recognised in the order Polyarthra:

- Canuellidae Lang, 1944
- Longipediidae Boeck, 1865
