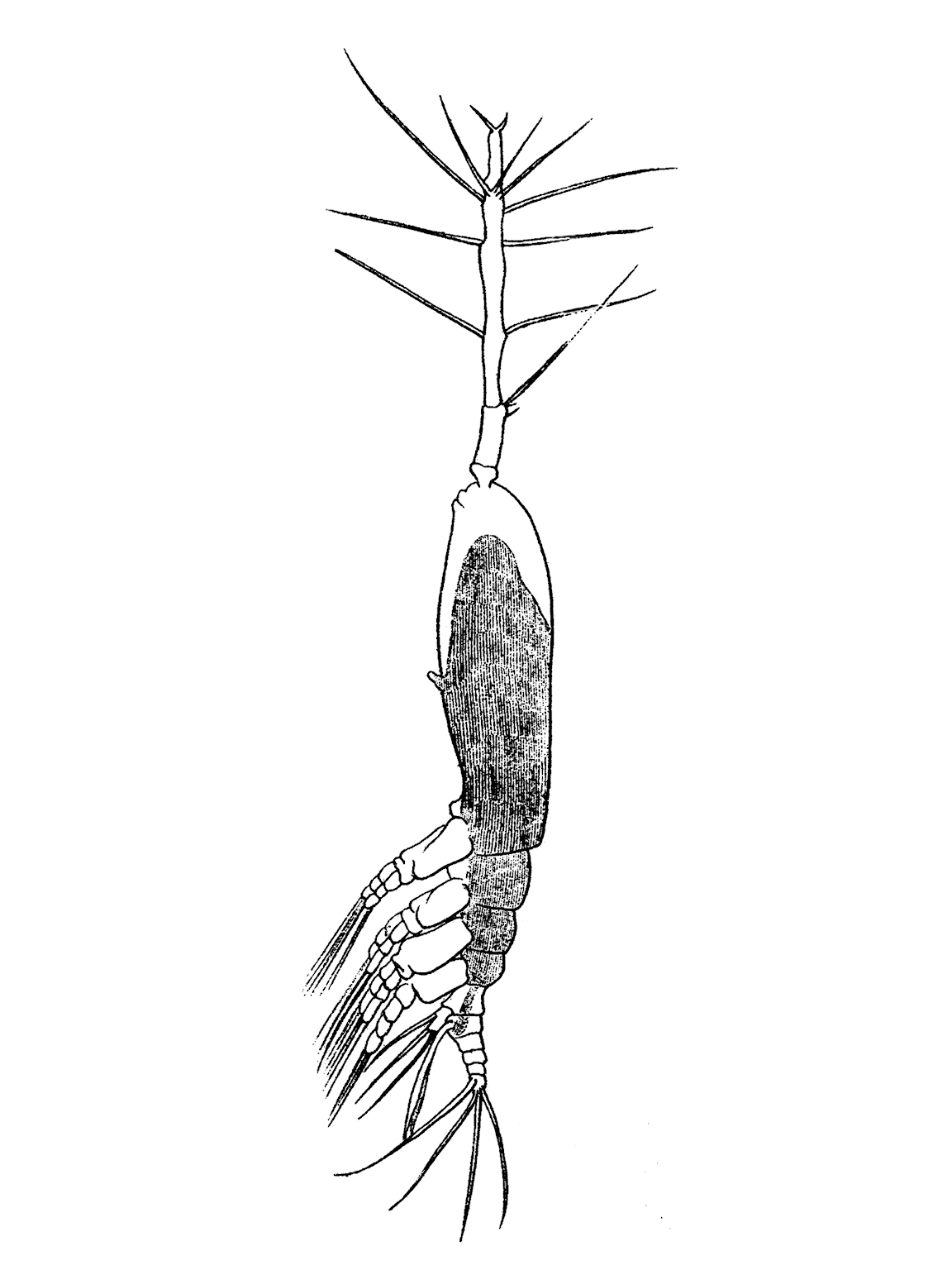
- Monstrilla longiremis

Scientific classification
- Kingdom: Animalia
- Phylum: Arthropoda
- Clade: Pancrustacea
- Class: Copepoda
- Infraclass: Neocopepoda
- Superorder: Podoplea
- Order: Monstrilloida; G.O. Sars, 1901
- Family: Monstrillidae; Dana, 1849

= Monstrillidae =

Order of crustaceans

Monstrilloida is an order of copepods with a cosmopolitan distribution in the world's oceans. The order contains a single family, Monstrillidae. The name of the first ever described genus Monstrilla is derived from Latin, meaning "tiny monster", because the lack of usual diagnostic features of copepods puzzled early taxonomists.

== Description ==
The family Monstrillidae is characterised by having a well-developed fourth pair of swimming legs, but a rudimentary or absent fifth pair. Adults have no oral appendages, and the mouth leads only to a short, blind pharynx. They also lack second antennae, but show large, multiramous and setaceous antennulae. These antennulae are rigid and anteriorly oriented. Females carry a long pair of spines to which the eggs are attached, while males have a "genital protuberance, which is provided with lappets"; in both sexes, the genitalia are very different from those of all other copepods. Some species have large, well-developed nauplius eyes, while others are basically blind.

Larval nauplial stages do not possess any discernible antennae, antenullae or mouth parts, but paired tube-shaped nourishing appendages to absorb nutrients from their host, which are also present in later copepodite stages that resemble the adult morphology; in adults, scars of these now discarded appendages remain as small processes on the cephalothorax.

Taxonomy of genera and species descriptions are normally based on a few key characteristics: the length and setation-pattern of the antennulae, presence/absence and morphology of the eyes, number and shape of caudal setae, and structure and setation-pattern of the fifth swimming leg in females/genital complex in males, respectively.

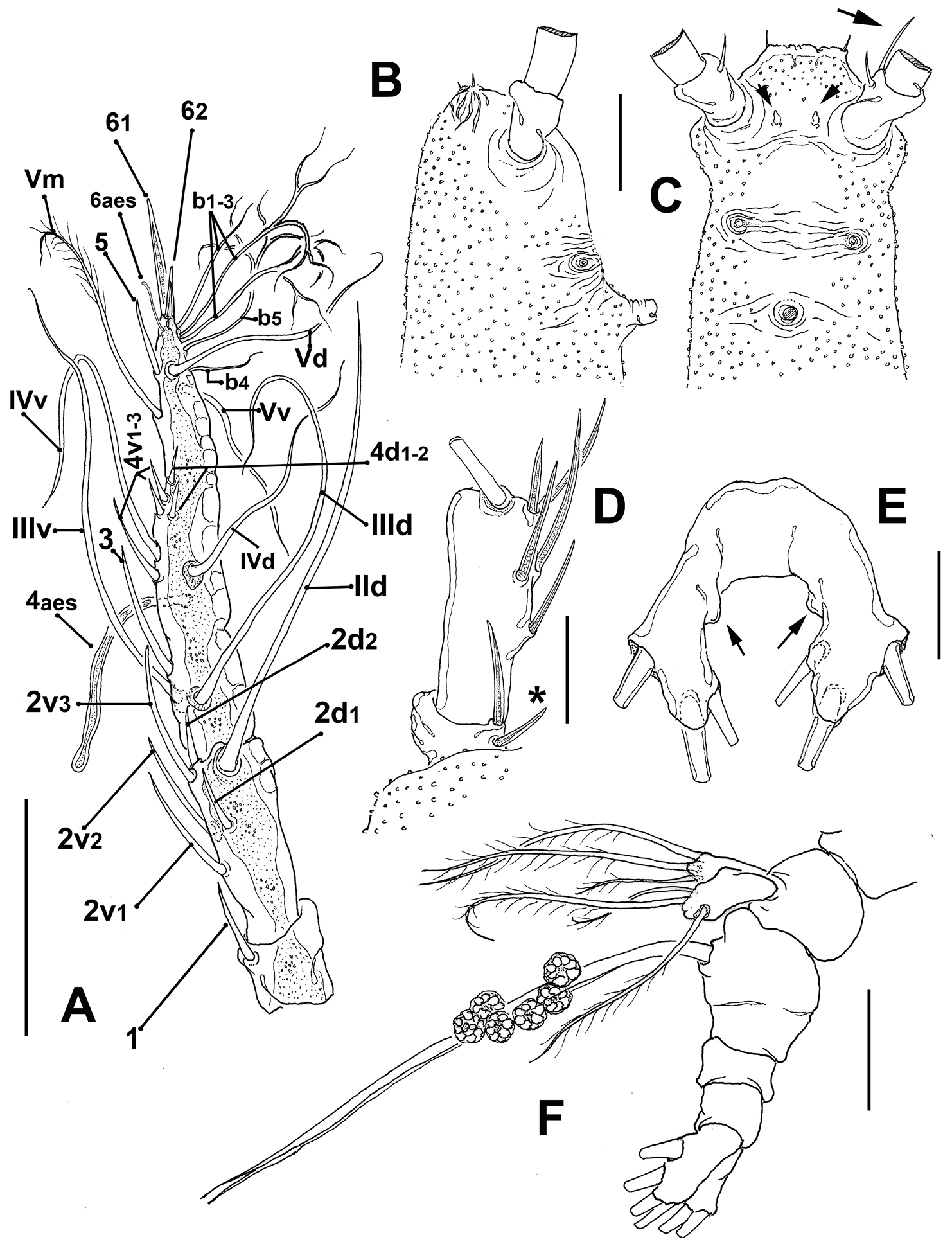
Some taxonomically important features of Monstrillopsis planifrons, including armature of the right antennule

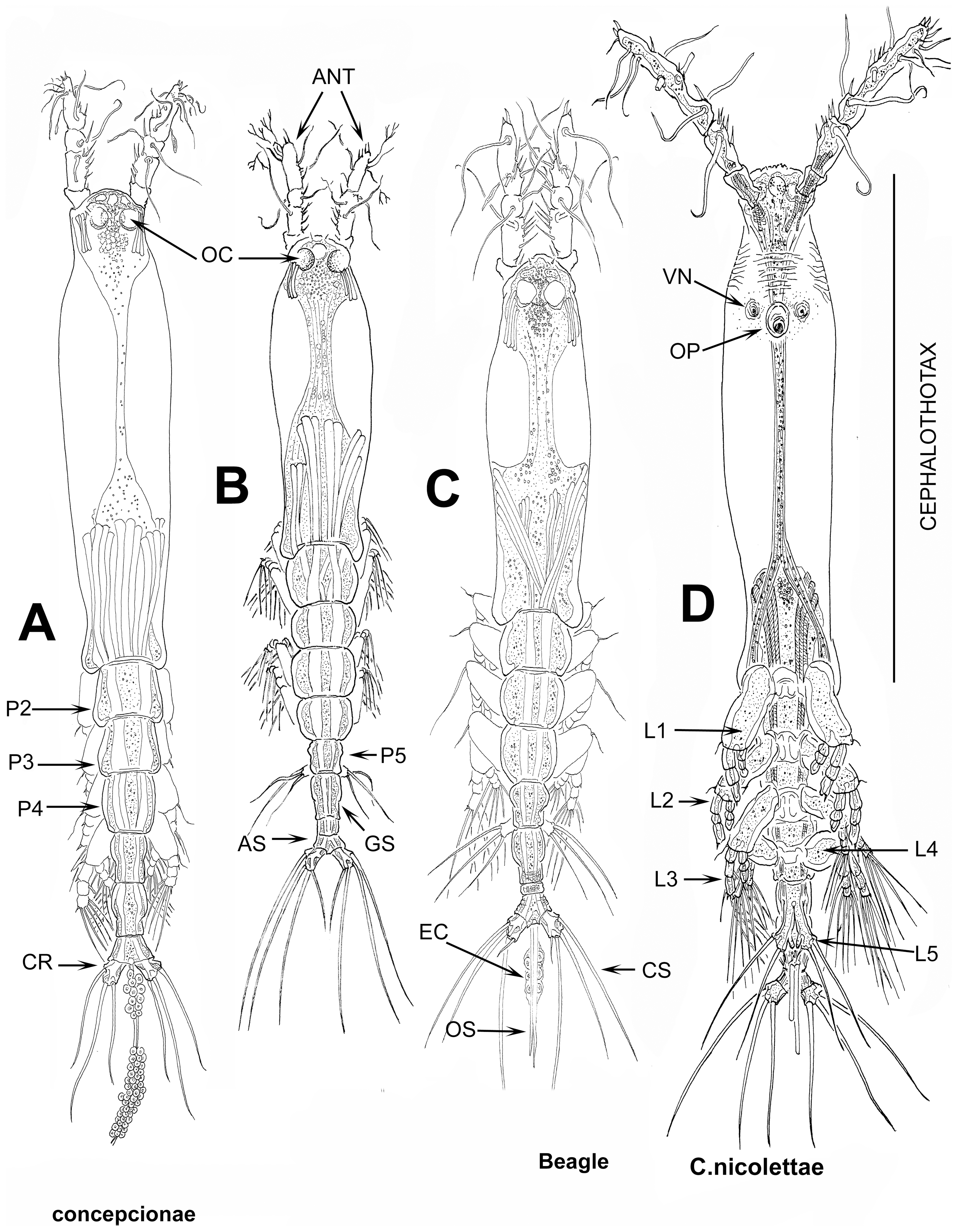
Monstrilloid diversity: females of A. Cymbasoma cocoense B. Monstrillopsis chilensis C. Monstrillopsis igniterra D. Cymbasoma nicolettae ANT = antennules; AS = anal somite; CR = caudal ramus; CS = caudal seta; EC = egg cluster; GS = genital somite; L1–L5 = legs 1–5; OC = ocellus; OP = oral papilla; OS = ovigerous spine; P2–P5 = pedigerous somites 2–5; VN = ventral nipple-like process.

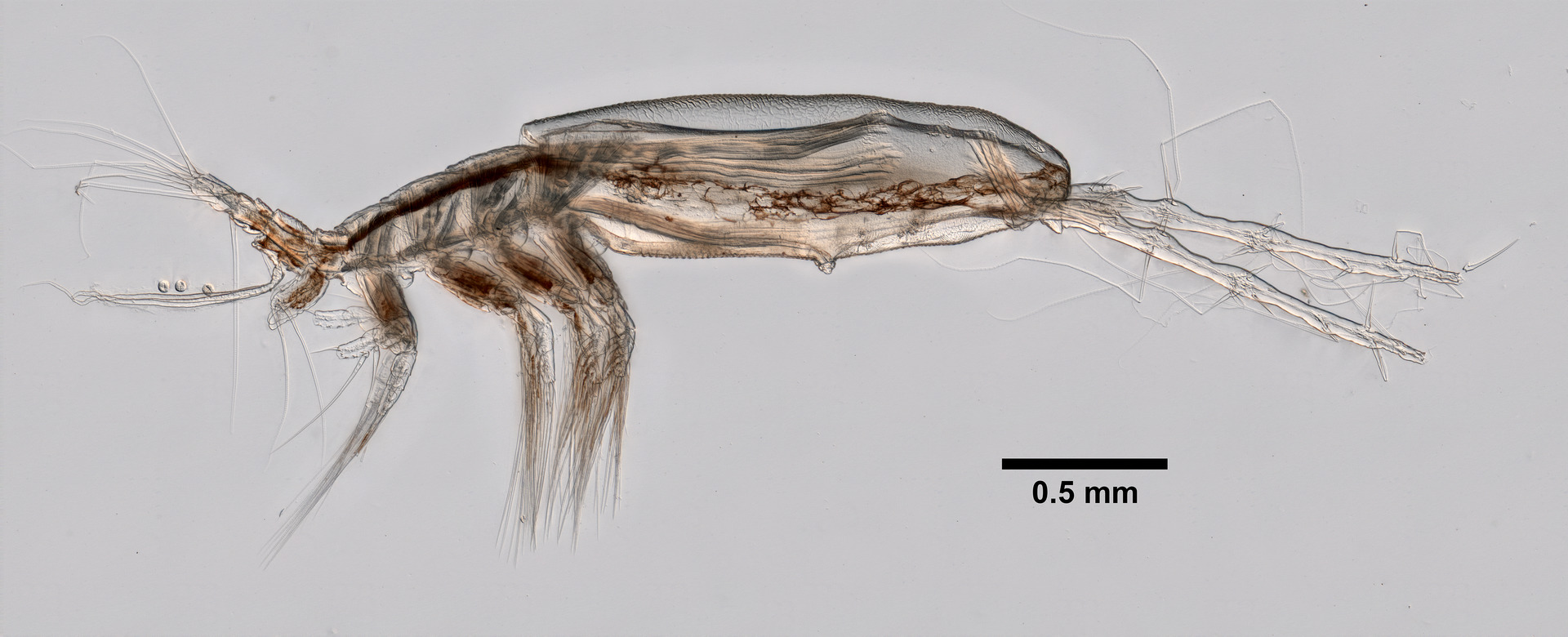
Monstrilla sp., lateral view

== Distribution ==
Monstrilloids are distributed worldwide (including both the Arctic and Antarctic), inhabiting coastal-neritic waters (0-200m depth). Adults are regularly caught with plankton nets and are clearly pelagic organisms; however, the endoparasitic larval stages infect sessile benthic organisms and therefore are part of the epibenthos and hyperbenthos.

== Biology ==
Biologically and ecologically, our knowledge of the order is limited, although the life cycle differs from that of all other copepods: Members of the Monstilloida are protelean parasites, meaning that their larval stages are parasitoids that kill their host to emerge as free-living subadults. Apparently, some hosts recover after the final subadult monstrilloid exits their body. It is hypothesized, that the host's relative body size and the number and location of copepods parasitizing the same host determine whether it survives an infection. The detailed life cycle may vary between different species, but generally follows a certain sequence: after a free-swimming, infective nauplius stage, the larvae develop inside benthic polychaetes, gastropods, sponges and bivalve mussels (They may be a pest in commercially important bivalve aquaculture), from where the planktonic adults emerge. They do not possess functioning mouth-parts, their sole purpose is to reproduce. In Contrast to holoplanktonic calanoid and cyclopoid copepods, Monstrilloids do not use their largest cephalic appendages, the antennulae, for locomotion, but to create a stream-line shaped corridor, rather using their four pairs of swimming legs to move in the water column. Sex determination depends on conspecifics infecting the same host individual. In case of 2-3 coexisting monstrilloids they become males, when there is only one parasite in a host, it develops into a female.

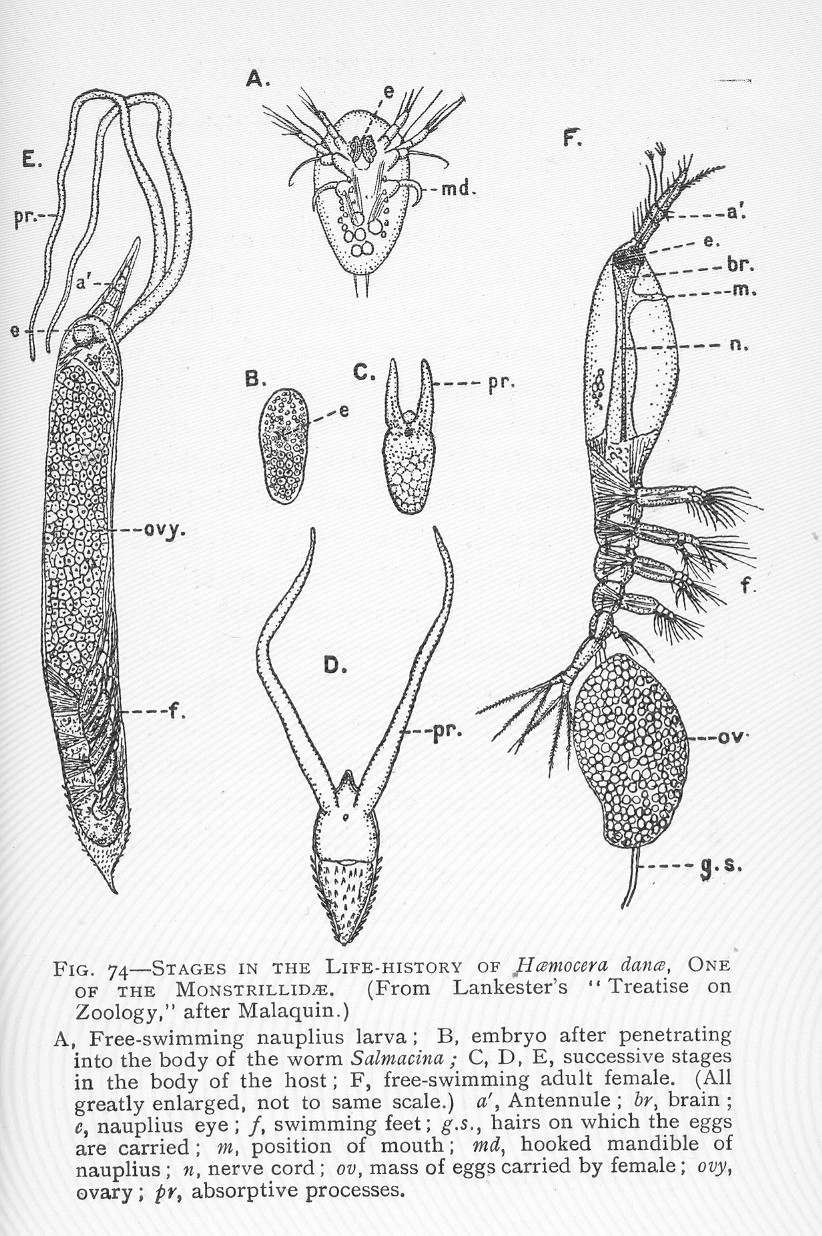
different life cycle stages of Cymbasoma danae

== Taxonomy ==
The taxonomy of the order and family is undergoing several revisions, for instance, the family Thaumatopsyllidae was formerly included in the order, but is now usually placed in the Cyclopoida. and the genus Strilloma is now considered a taxonomic synonym of Monstrilla, the largest genus. In General, the Monstrilloida are taxonomically challenging, both regarding their relation to other copepod groups and species assignment within the order. Monstrilloida was placed as a sister taxa to the Siphonostomatoida, but a lack of mouth parts makes comparison based on homologies difficult. A more recent analysis placed the order nested within the fish-parasitizing caligiform groups of Siphonostomatoida. Consequently, they would have evolved from an ectoparasitic ancestor associated with fish; most parasitic copepods are not free-living as adults, so Monstrilloids presumably underwent a change in life cycle strategy, host selection and body morphology. So far, no ultimately satisfying copepod phylogeny has been proposed, and the placement of the monophyletic Monstrilloida remains unresolved.

Because of their enigmatic life cycle, the morphology of most postnaupliar and copepodite stages is not known. Monstrilloids are not abundant in planktonic samples, and often only single specimens can be collected. Since many species occupy overlapping geographic ranges, males and females of different species collected in the same sample may be mistaken for conspecifics. Until now, both sexes were described for less than 25% of all known species. To link males and females of a species, taxonomists have started to use molecular methods such as DNA Barcoding recently.

As of 2019, the order Monstrilloida contains seven accepted genera with more than 160 species:

- Monstrilla Dana, 1849
- Australomonstrillopsis Suárez-Morales & McKinnon, 2014
- Caromiobenella Jeon, Lee & Soh, 2018
- Cymbasoma Thompson, 1888
- Maemonstrilla Grygier & Ohtsuka, 2008
- Monstrillopsis Sars, 1921
- Spinomonstrilla Suárez-Morales, 2019
