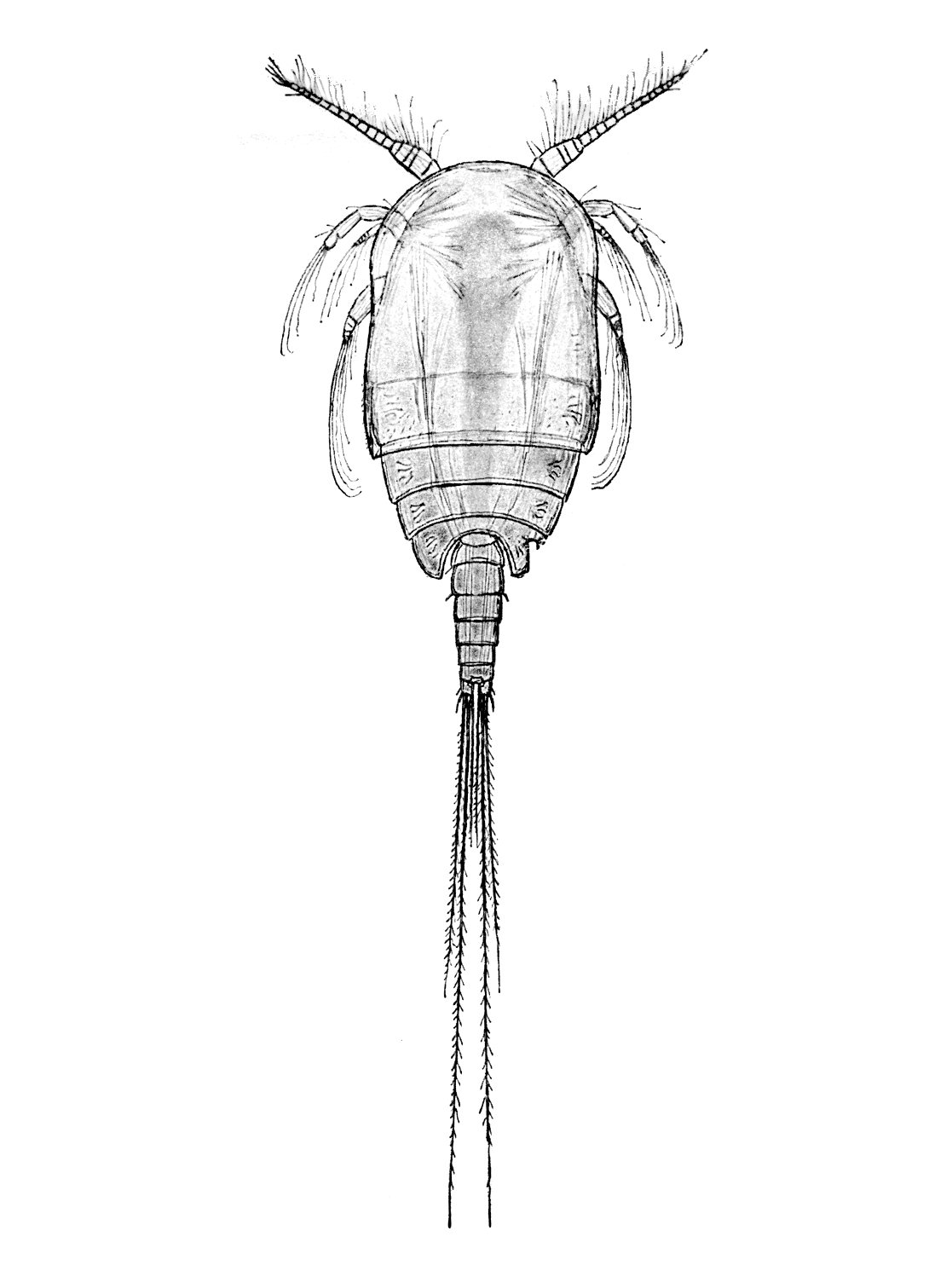
- Benthomisophria palliata (Misophriidae)

Scientific classification
- Domain: Eukaryota
- Kingdom: Animalia
- Phylum: Arthropoda
- Class: Copepoda
- Infraclass: Neocopepoda
- Superorder: Podoplea
- Order: Misophrioida; Gurney, 1927

= Misophrioida =

Order of crustaceans

Misophrioida is an order of copepods, containing the following families:

- Misophriidae Boxshall & Jaume, 2000
- Palpophriidae Boxshall & Jaume, 2000
- Speleophriidae Boxshall & Jaume, 2000
