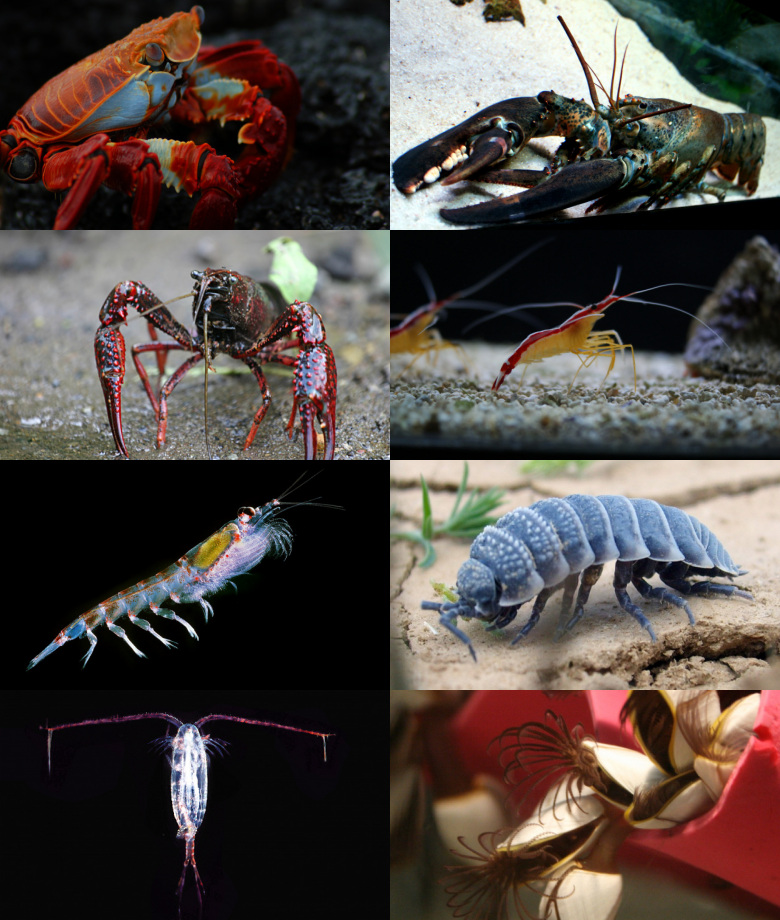
- From left to right and from top to bottom: Grapsus grapsus (a crab), Homarus gammarus (a lobster), Procambarus clarkii (a crayfish), Lysmata amboinensis (a shrimp), Euphausia superba (a krill), Hemilepistus reaumuri (a woodlouse), Calanoida (a copepod), and Lepas anatifera (a barnacle)

Scientific classification
- Kingdom: Animalia
- Phylum: Arthropoda
- Clade: Pancrustacea
- Superclass: Multicrustacea; Regier, Shultz, Zwick, Hussey, Ball, Wetzer, Martin & Cunningham, 2010

Classes
- Copepoda; Malacostraca; Thecostraca; Tantulocarida; †Cyclida; †Thylacocephala

= Multicrustacea =

Multicrustacea Temporal range: Middle Cambrian–Present

Superclass of crustaceans

The clade Multicrustacea constitutes the largest superclass of crustaceans, containing approximately four-fifths of all described non-hexapod crustacean species, including crabs, lobsters, crayfish, shrimp, krill, prawns, woodlice, barnacles, copepods, amphipods, mantis shrimp and others. The largest branch of Multicrustacea is the class Malacostraca (see below).

== Classification ==
- Superclass Multicrustacea Regier, Shultz, Zwick, Hussey, Ball, Wetzer, Martin & Cunningham, 2010
  - Class Unknown
    - Order Unknown
      - †Family Priscansermarinidae Newman, 2004
  - Class Copepoda Milne-Edwards, 1840 – Copepods (Note: Class Hexanauplia Oakley, Wolfe, Lindgren & Zaharof, 2013 was proposed for copepods and thecostracans, but not supported by subsequent studies.)
    - Infraclass Neocopepoda Huys & Boxshall, 1991
      - Superorder Gymnoplea Giesbrecht, 1882
        - Order Calanoida Sars GO, 1903
      - Superorder Podoplea Giesbrecht, 1882
        - Order Cyclopoida Burmeister, 1834
        - Order Gelyelloida Huys, 1988
        - Order Harpacticoida G. O. Sars, 1903
        - Order Misophrioida Gurney, 1933
        - Order Monstrilloida Sars, 1901
        - Order Mormonilloida Boxshall, 1979
        - Order Polyarthra Lang, 1944 (=Canuelloida Khodami, Vaun MacArthur, Blanco-Bercial & Martinez Arbizu, 2017 )
        - Order Siphonostomatoida Thorell, 1859
    - Infraclass Progymnoplea Lang, 1948
      - Order Platycopioida Fosshagen, 1985
  - Class Thecostraca Gruvel, 1905
    - Subclass Ascothoracida Lacaze-Duthiers, 1880
      - Order Dendrogastrida Grygier, 1987
      - Order Laurida Grygier, 1987
    - Subclass Cirripedia Burmeister, 1834
      - Infraclass Acrothoracica Gruvel, 1905
        - Order Cryptophialida Kolbasov, Newman & Hoeg, 2009
        - Order Lithoglyptida Kolbasov, Newman & Hoeg, 2009
      - Infraclass Rhizocephala Müller, 1862
      - Infraclass Thoracica Darwin, 1854
        - Superorder Phosphatothoracica Gale, 2019
          - Order Iblomorpha Buckeridge & Newman, 2006
          - †Order Eolepadomorpha Chan et al., 2021
        - Superorder Thoracicalcarea Gale, 2015
          - Order Balanomorpha Pilsbry, 1916
          - Order Calanticomorpha Chan et al., 2021
          - Order Pollicipedomorpha Chan et al., 2021
          - Order Scalpellomorpha Buckeridge & Newman, 2006
          - Order Verrucomorpha Pilsbry, 1916
          - †Order Archaeolepadomorpha Chan et al., 2021
          - †Order Brachylepadomorpha Withers, 1923
    - Subclass Facetotecta Grygier, 1985
  - Class Tantulocarida Boxshall & Lincoln, 1983
    - Family Basipodellidae Boxshall & Lincoln, 1983
    - Family Cumoniscidae Nierstrasz & Brender à Brandis, 1923 (=Deoterthridae Boxshall & Lincoln, 1987)
    - Family Doryphallophoridae Huys, 1991
    - Family Microdajidae Boxshall & Lincoln, 1987
    - Family Onceroxenidae Huys, 1991
  - Class Malacostraca Latreille, 1802
    - Subclass Eumalacostraca Grobben, 1892
      - Superorder Eucarida Calman, 1904
        - Order Decapoda Latreille, 1802 – crabs, lobsters, crayfish, shrimp and prawns (includes former order Order Amphionidacea Williamson, 1973)
        - Order Euphausiacea Dana, 1852 – krill
      - Superorder Peracarida Calman, 1904
        - Order Amphipoda Latreille, 1816 – amphipods
        - Order Bochusacea Gutu & Iliffe, 1998
        - Order Cumacea Krøyer, 1846 – comma shrimp
        - Order Ingolfiellida Hansen, 1903
        - Order Isopoda Latreille, 1817 – isopods
        - Order Lophogastrida Sars, 1870 – lophogastrids
        - Order Mictacea Bowman, Garner, Hessler, Iliffe & Sanders, 1985 – mictaceans
        - Order Mysida Haworth, 1825 – mysids
        - †Order Pygocephalomorpha
        - Order Spelaeogriphacea Gordon, 1957 – spelaeogriphaceans
        - Order Stygiomysida Tchindonova, 1981 – stygiomysids
        - Order Tanaidacea Dana, 1849 – tanaids
        - Order Thermosbaenacea Monod, 1927
      - Superorder Syncarida Packard, 1879
        - Order Anaspidacea Calman, 1904
        - Order Bathynellacea Chappuis, 1915
        - †Order Palaeocaridacea Brooks, 1962
    - Subclass Hoplocarida Calman, 1904
      - Order Stomatopoda Latreille, 1817 – mantis shrimp
    - Subclass Phyllocarida Packard, 1879
      - †Order Archaeostraca Claus, 1888
      - †Order Canadaspidida Novozhilov, 1960
      - †Order Hoplostraca Schram, 1973
      - †Order Hymenostraca Rolfe, 1969
      - Order Leptostraca Claus, 1880
      - †Genus Nothozoe Barrande, 1872
  - Incertae sedis
    - †Order Cyclida
    - †Order Thylacocephala

== Fossil record ==
The earliest fossils representative of Multicrustacea are from the Cambrian. However, the more specific timeline is uncertain. Some Cambrian fossils of uncertain taxonomic placement, such as those of Priscansermarinus, are nonetheless likely to be members of Multicrustacea.

Phylogenetic analyses incorporating morphological data have also placed several Paleozoic taxa within or near the clade, though some positions vary depending on the analytical method used. In a 2013 study, the Cambrian arthropod Waptia resolved as either a sister group to Malacostraca or to Multicrustacea as a whole, while phosphatocopines – more commonly allied with ostracods – grouped with Thecostraca based on larval and carapace characteristics. In the same analysis, the Silurian fossil Cinerocaris consistently resolved as a stem-group leptostracan, providing a minimum age constraint of 425 million years ago for crown Malacostraca.

== Image gallery ==
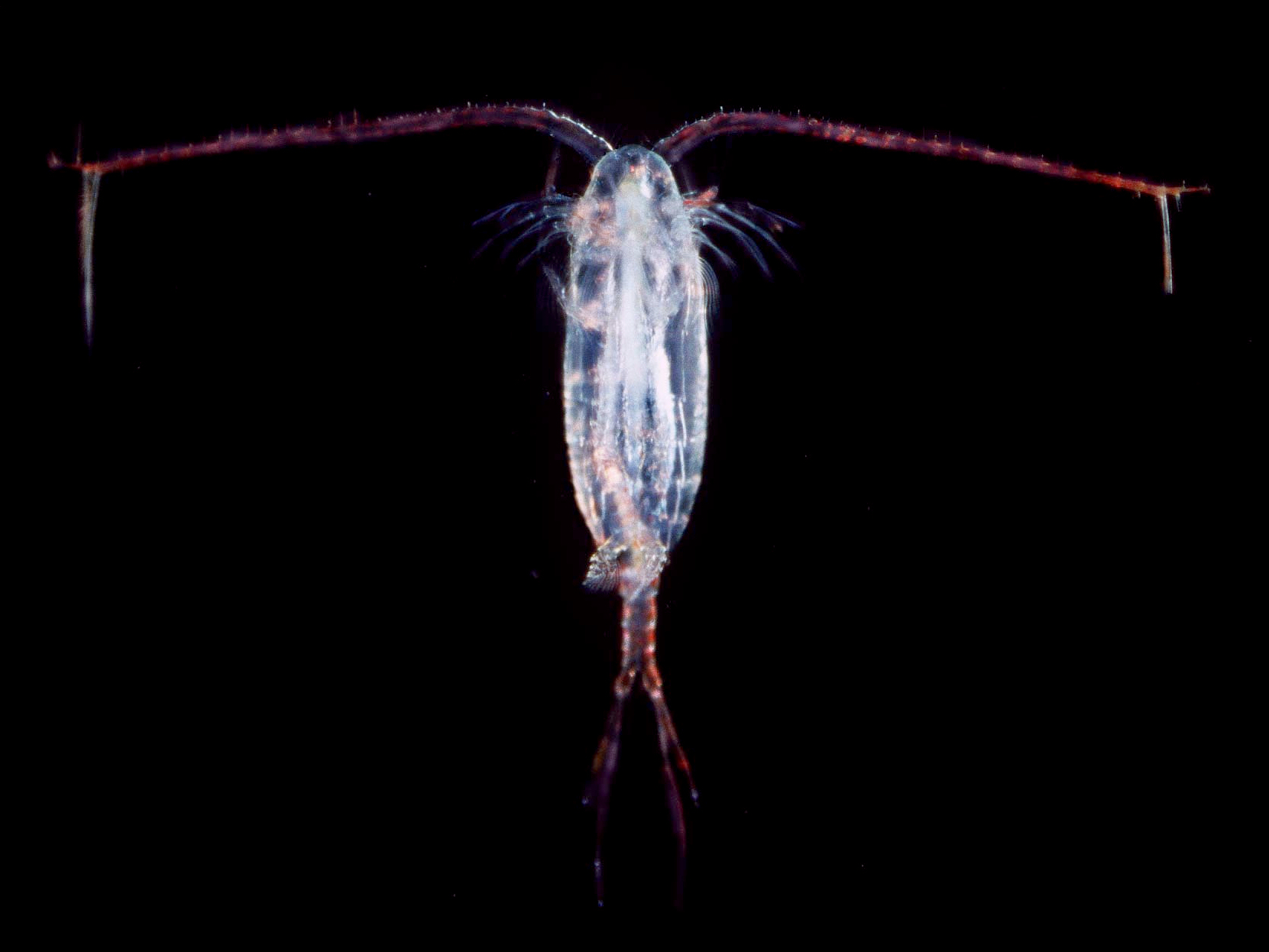
Copepod

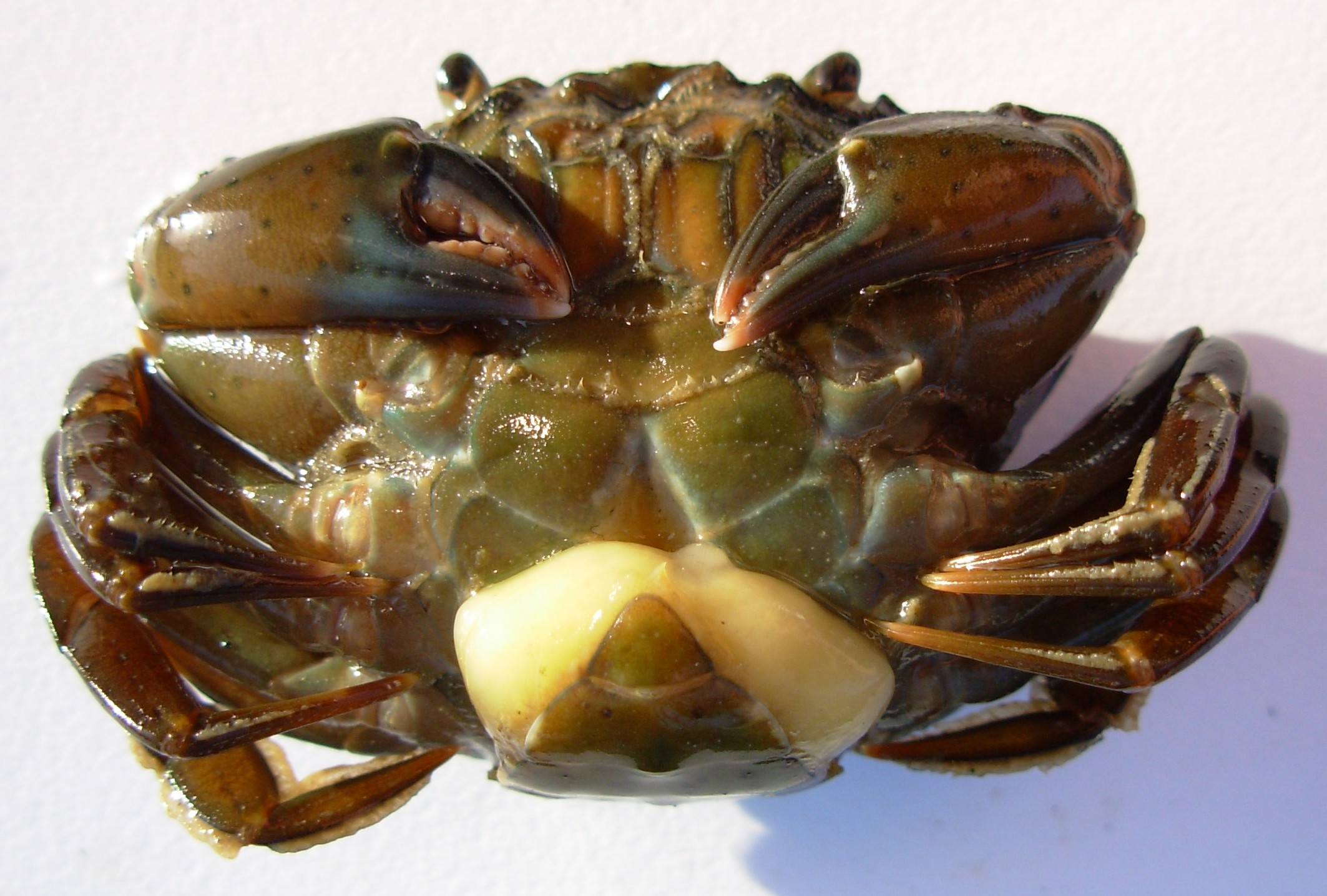
Sacculina Sacculina carcini (Rhizocephala) parasite of a crab.

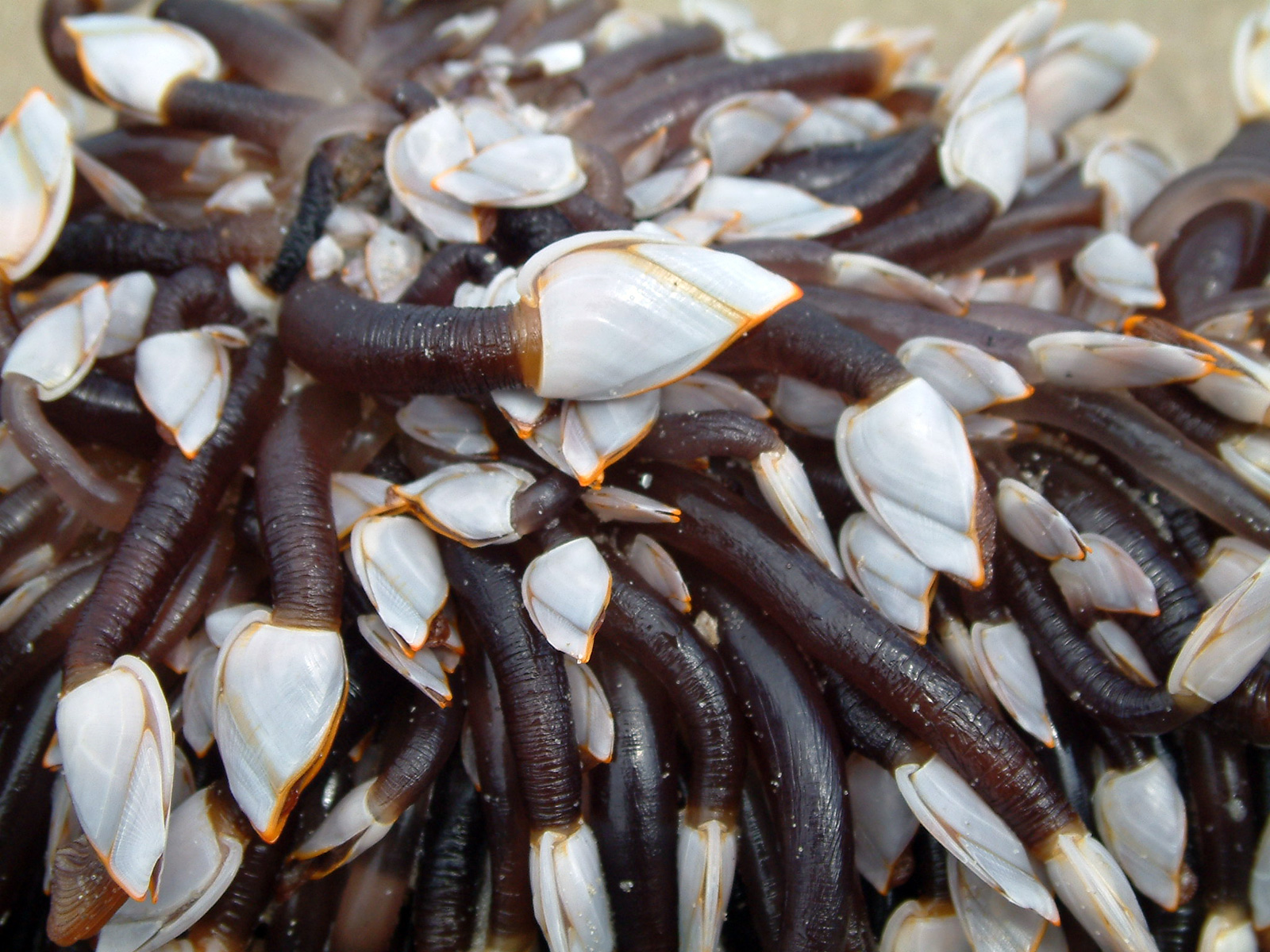
Anew Lepas anatifera (Lepadiformes)

Balth Chthamalus stellatus (Sessilia)

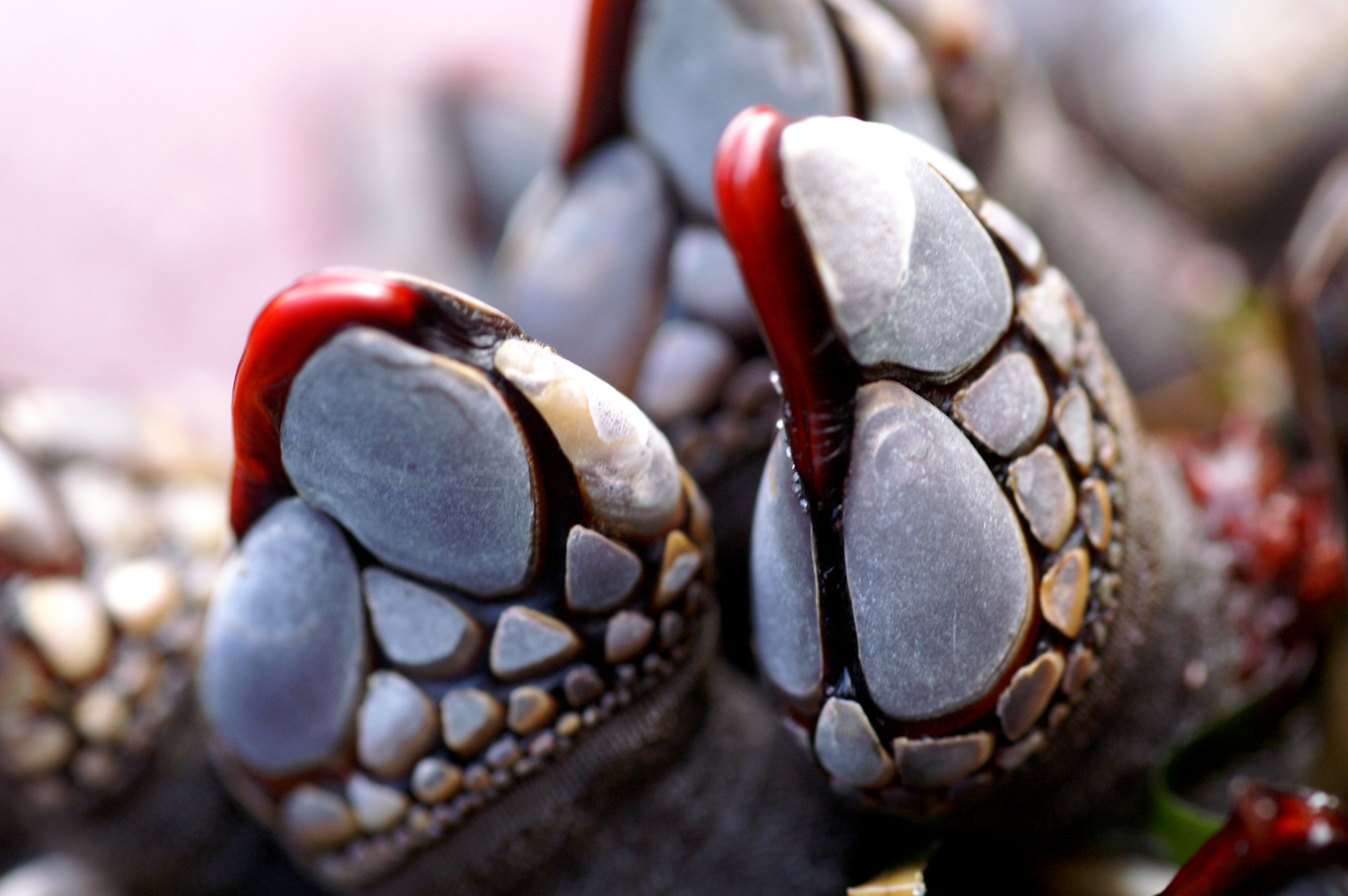
Inch-foot Pollicipes polymerus (Scalpelliformes)

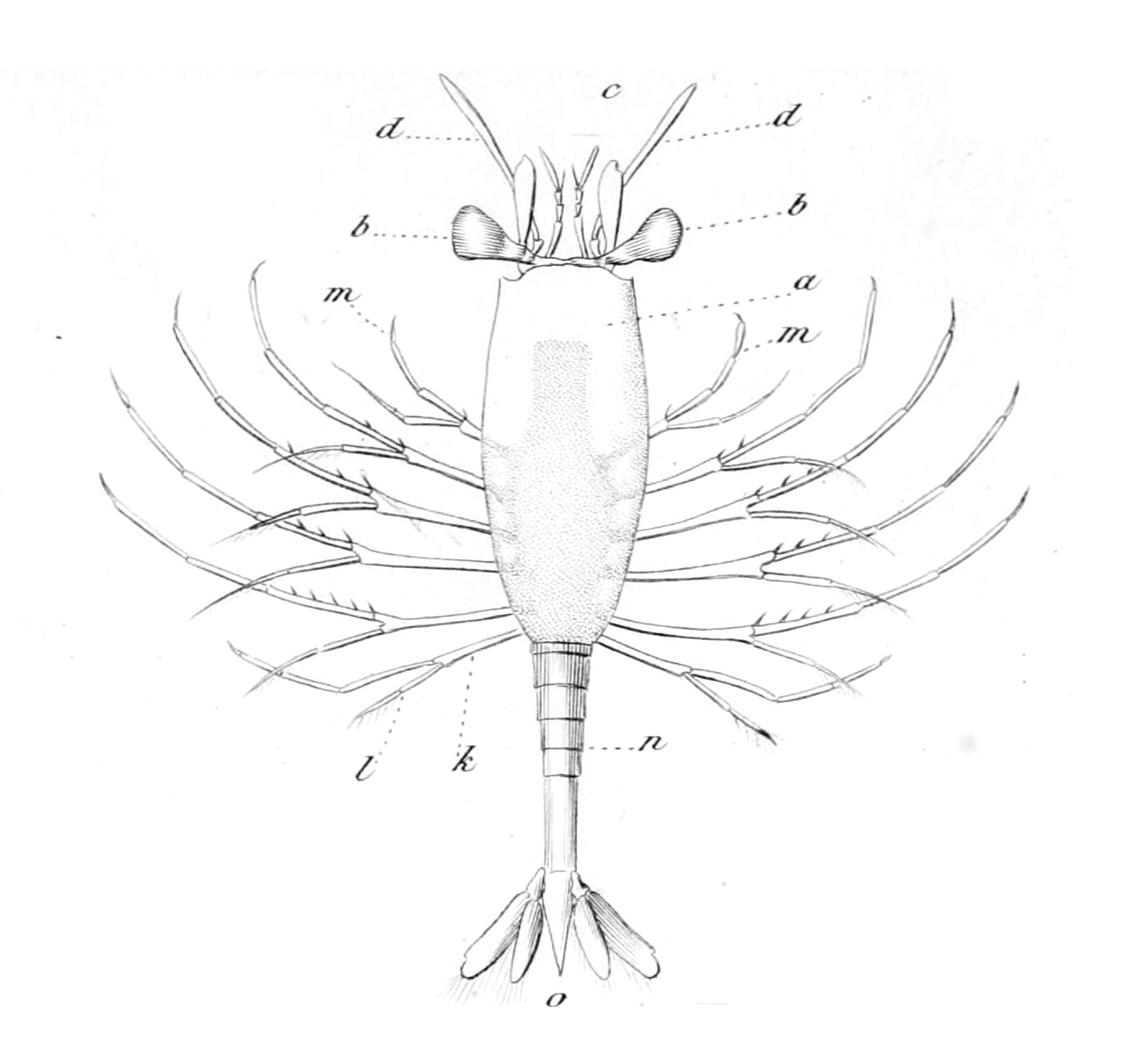
Amphionides reynaudii, the unique Amphionidacea known.

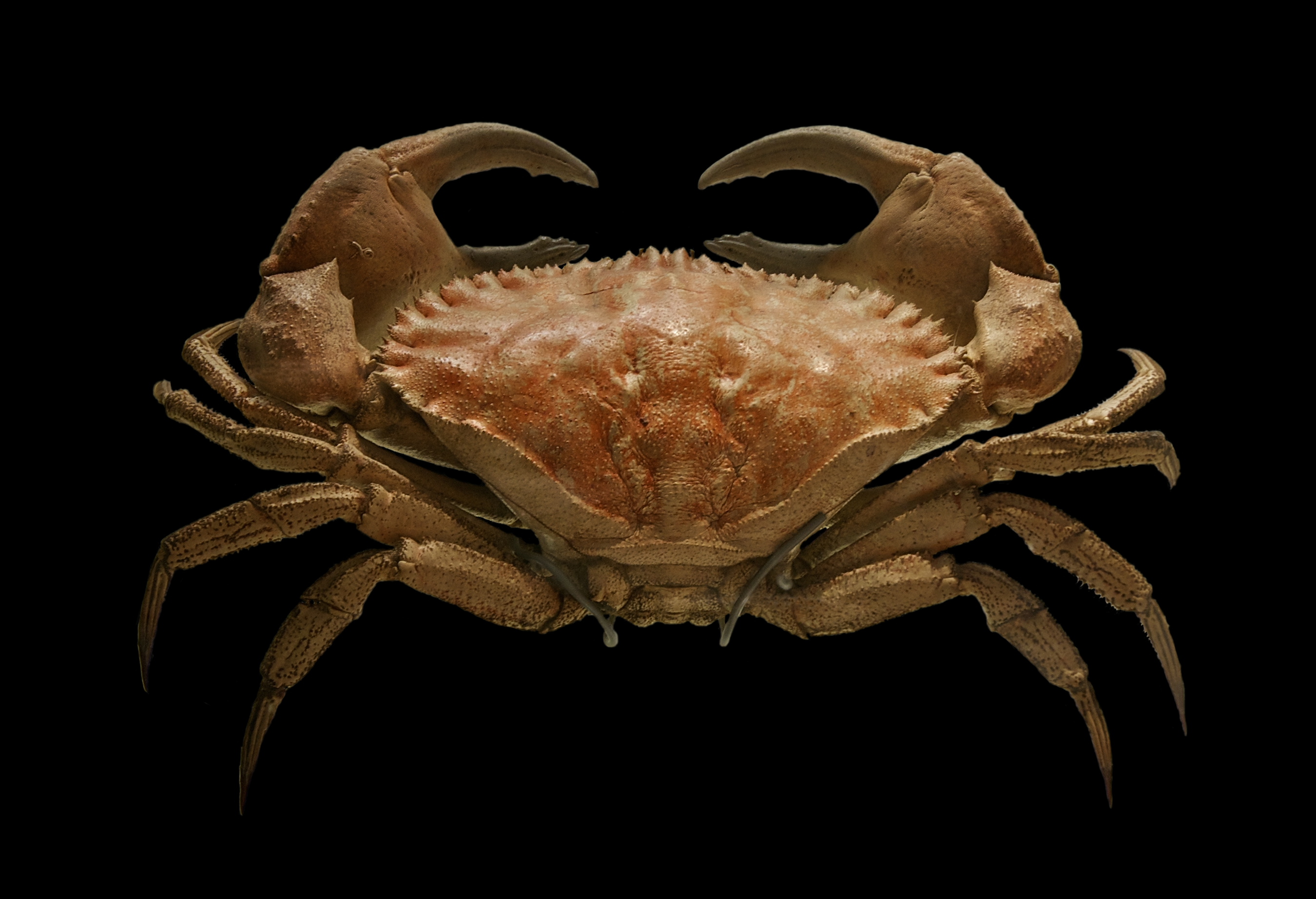
Crab Cancer bellianus (Eucarida)

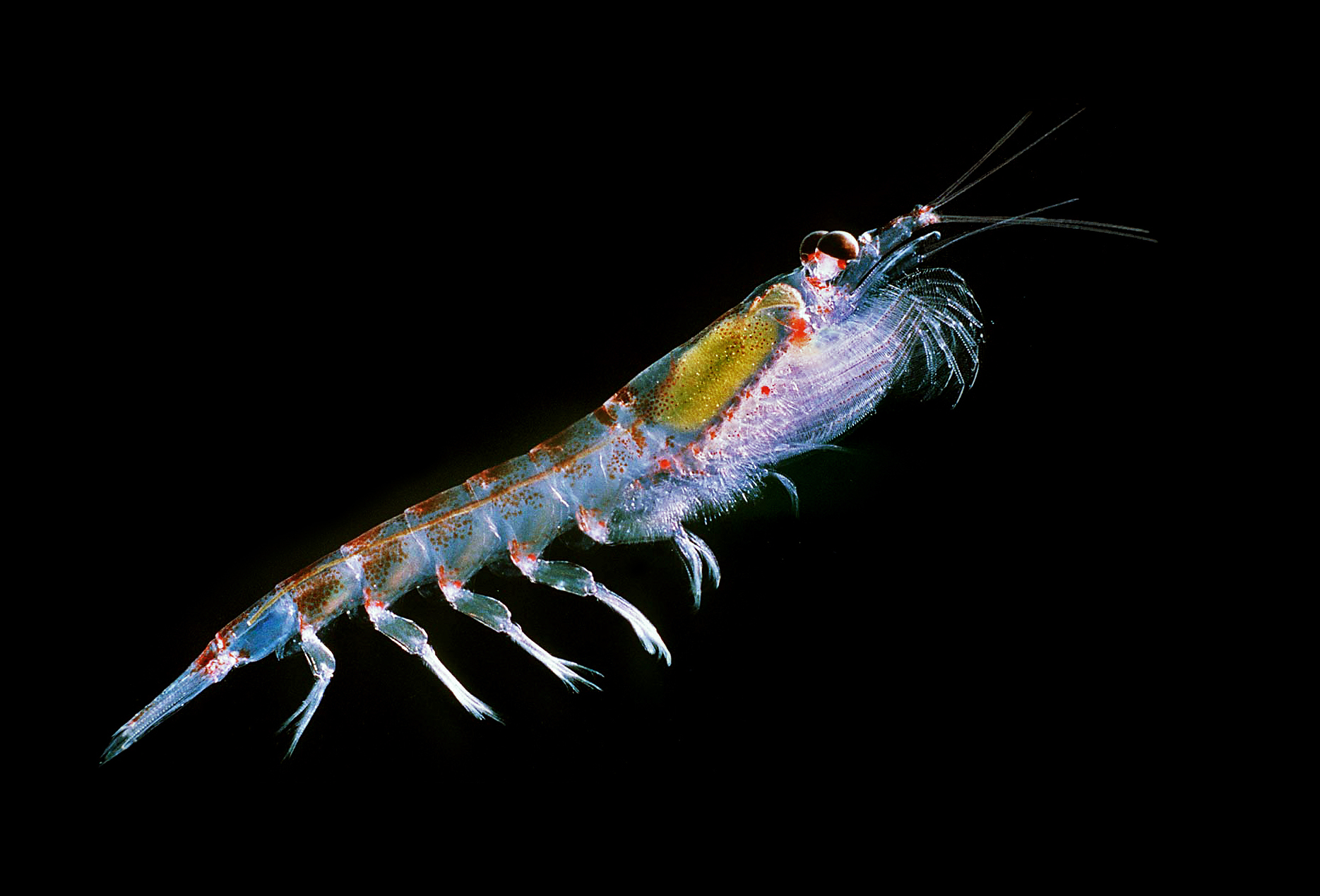
Antarctic Krill Euphausia superba (Euphausiacea)

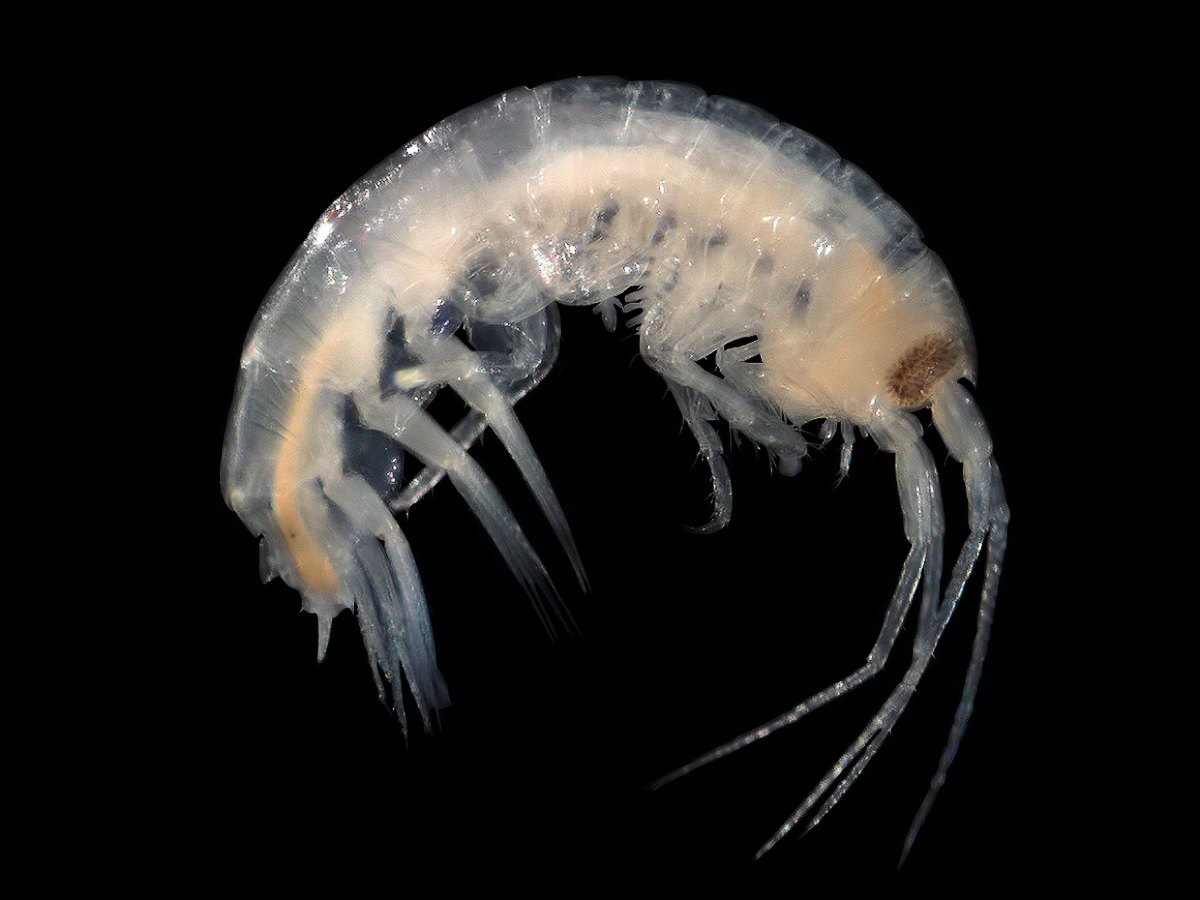
Atylus swammerdami (Amphipoda)

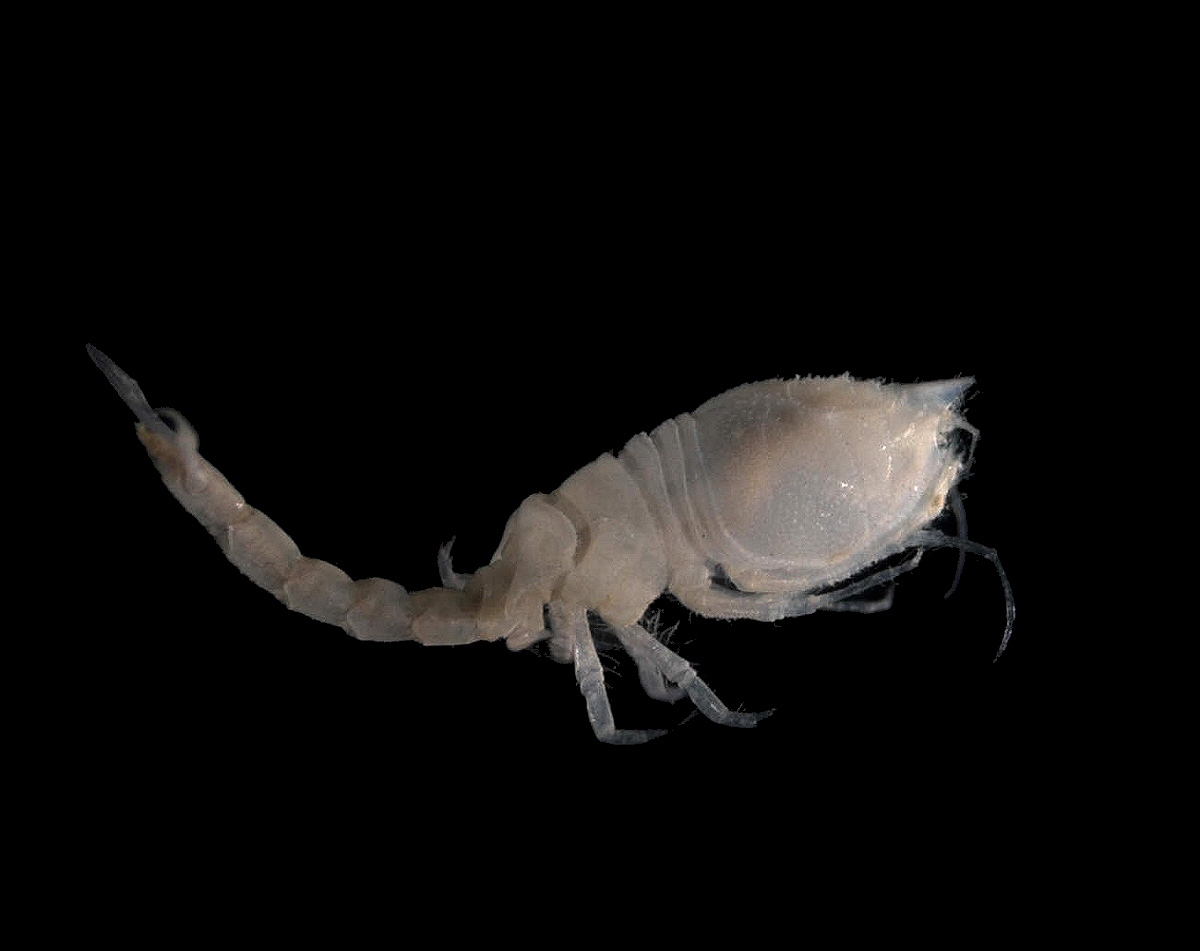
Diastylis bradyi (Cumacea)

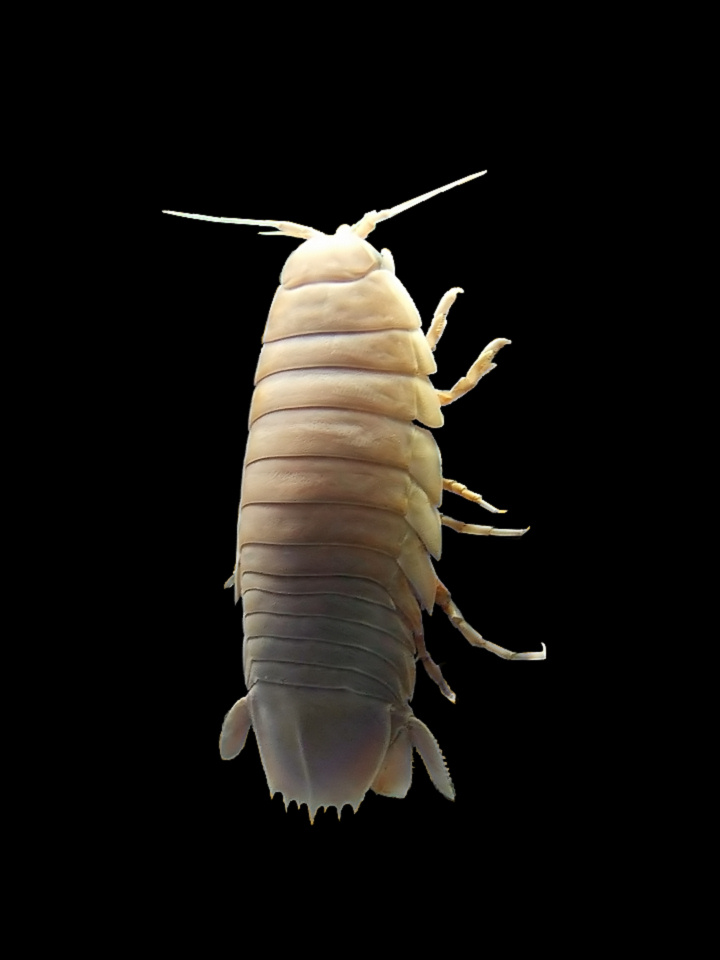
Bathynomus doederleinii (Isopoda)

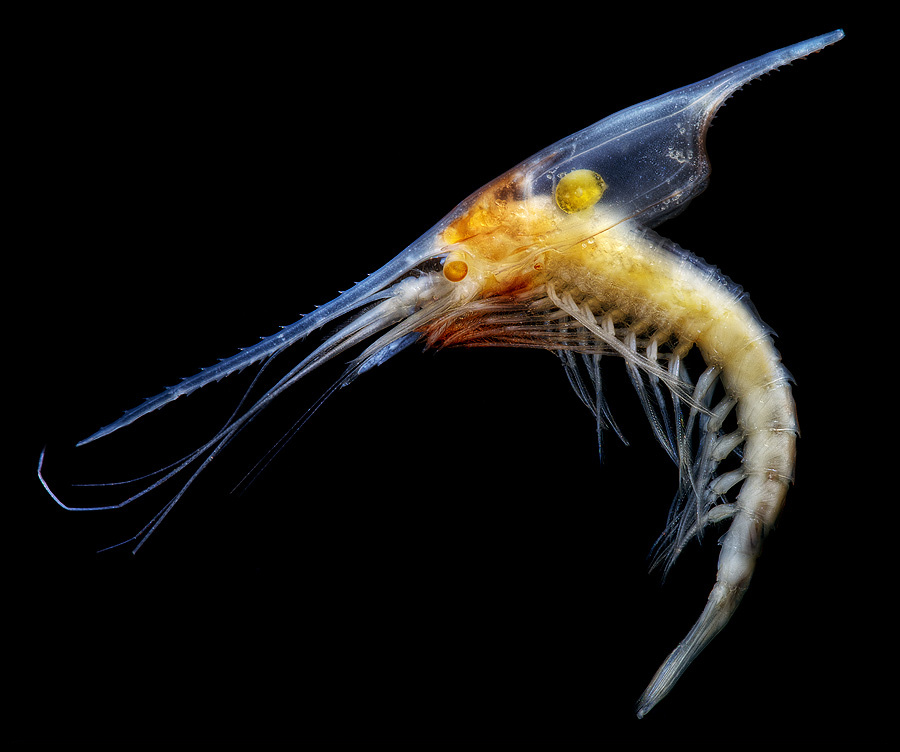
Gnathophausia zoea (Lophogastrida)

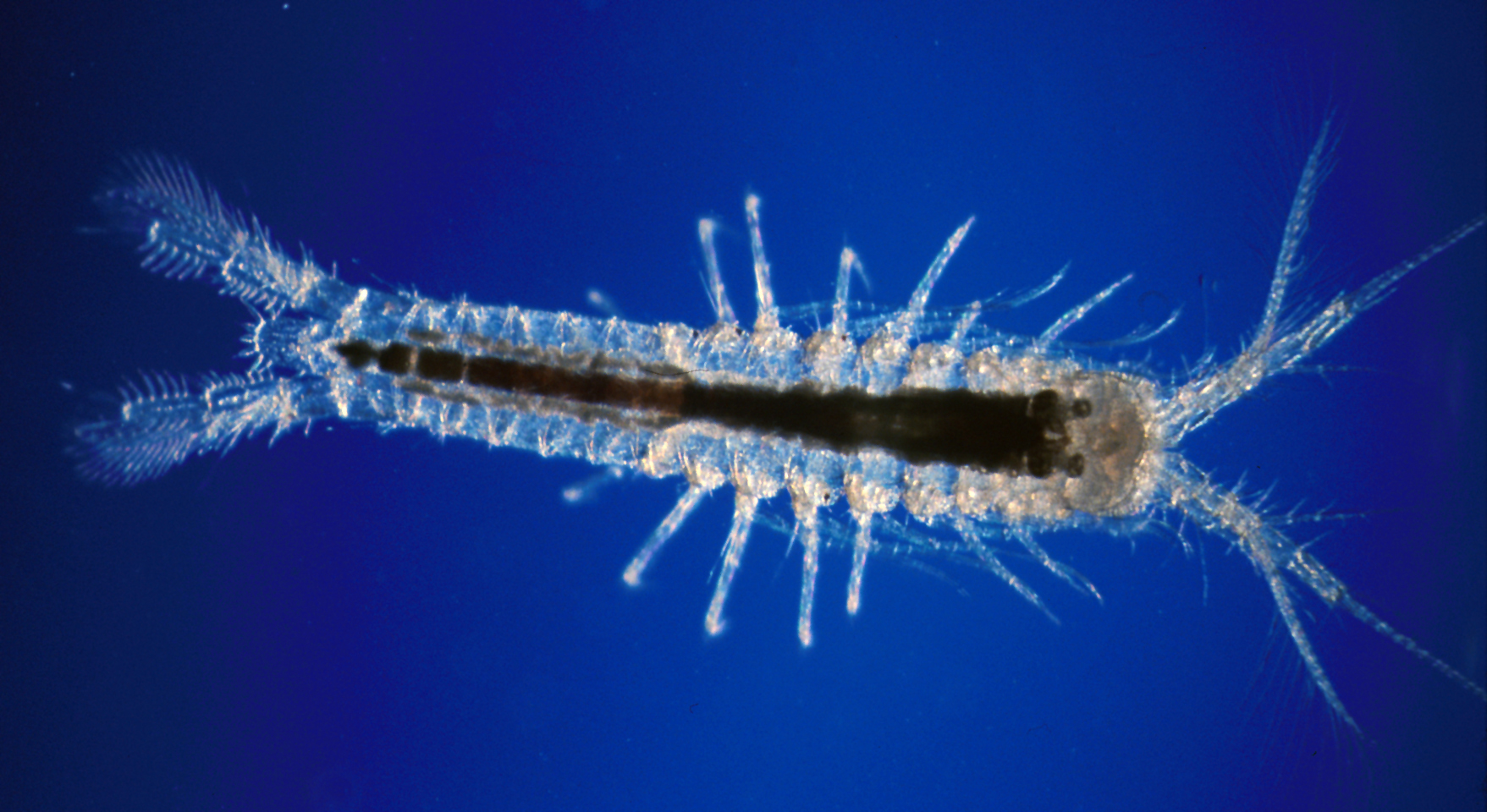
Mictocaris halope (Mictacea)

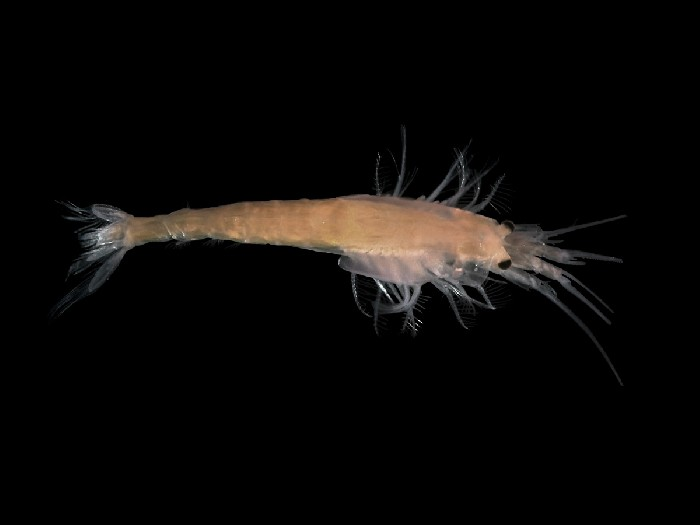
Gastrosaccus spinifer (Mysida)

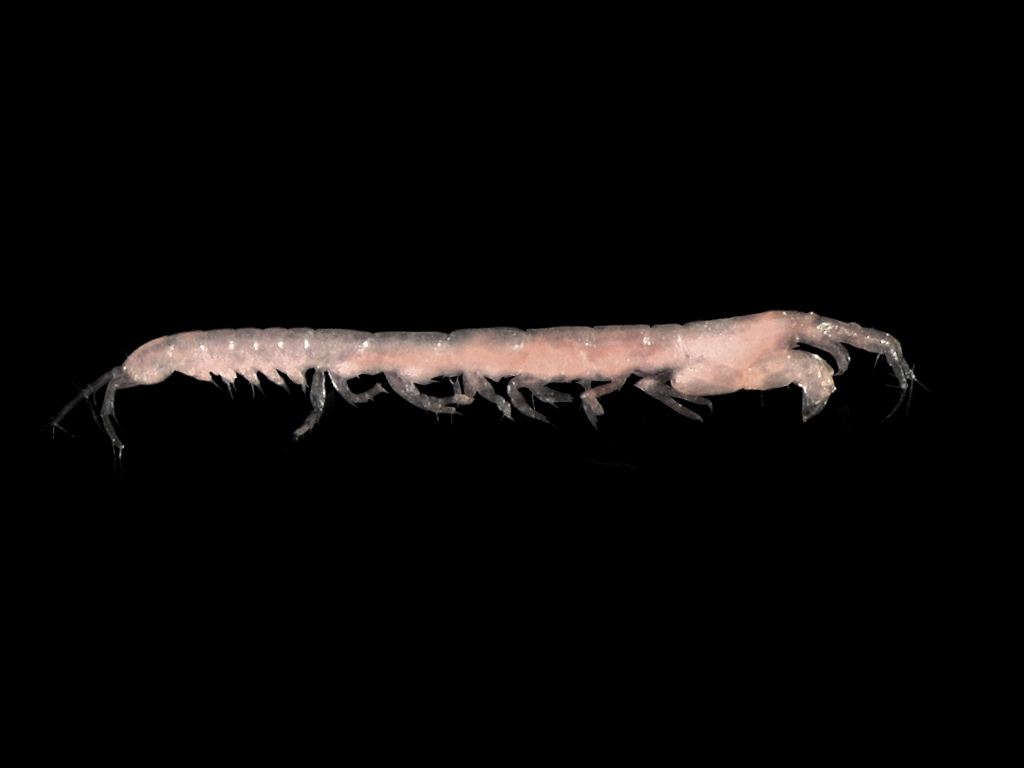
Tanaissus lilljeborgi (Tanaidacea)

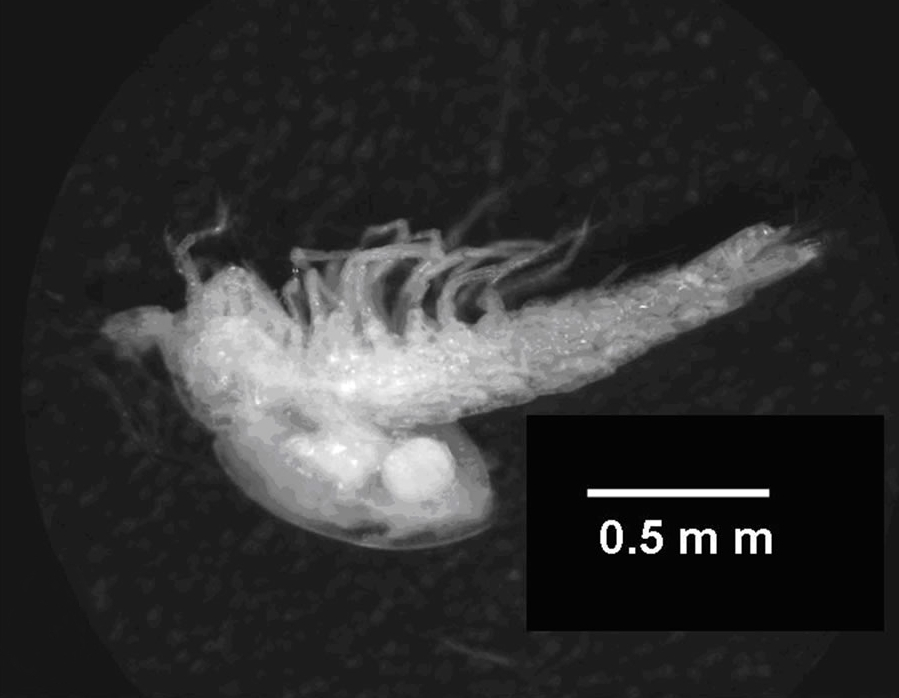
Tethysbaena ophelicola (Thermosbaenacea)

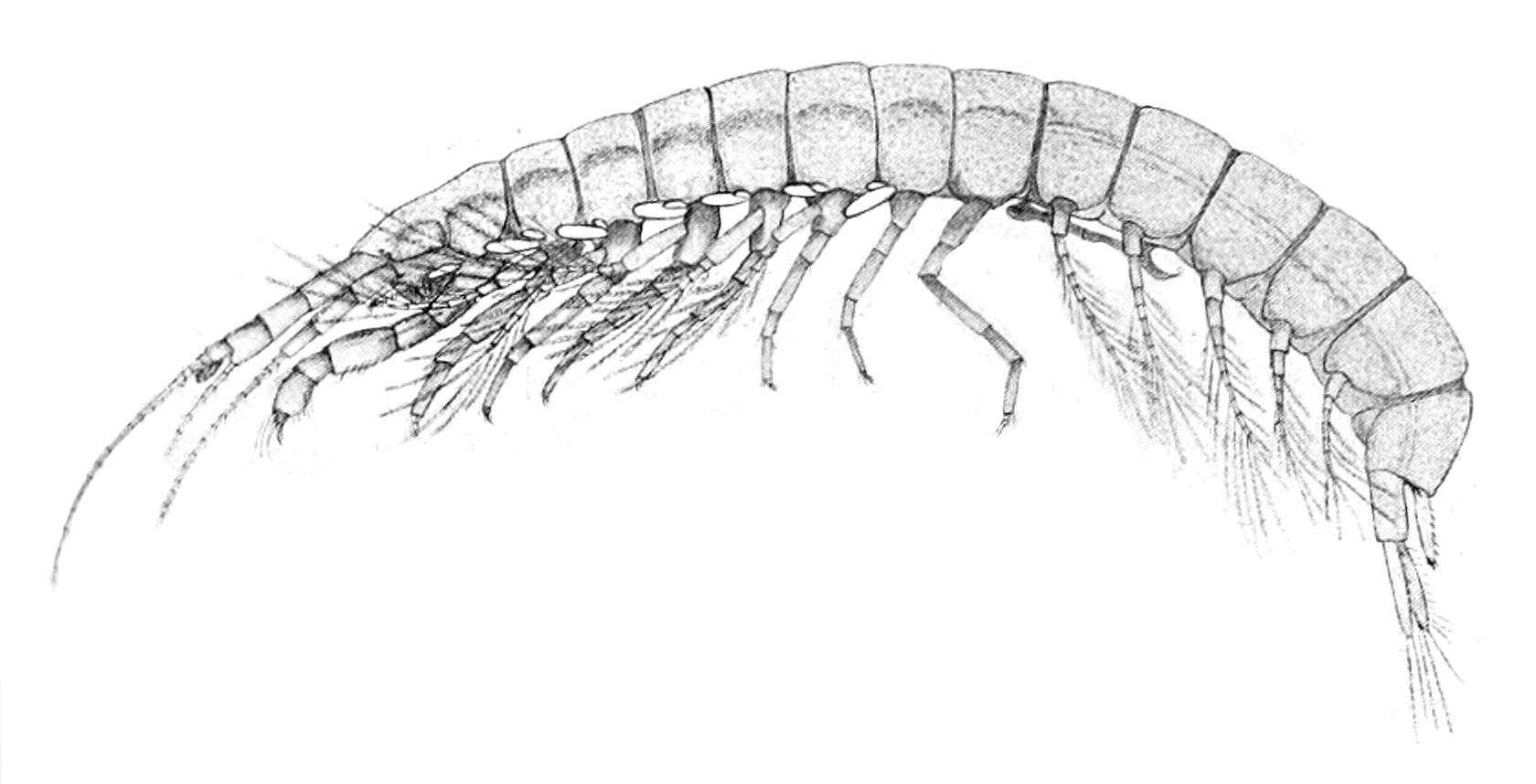
Koonunga cursor (Anaspidacea)

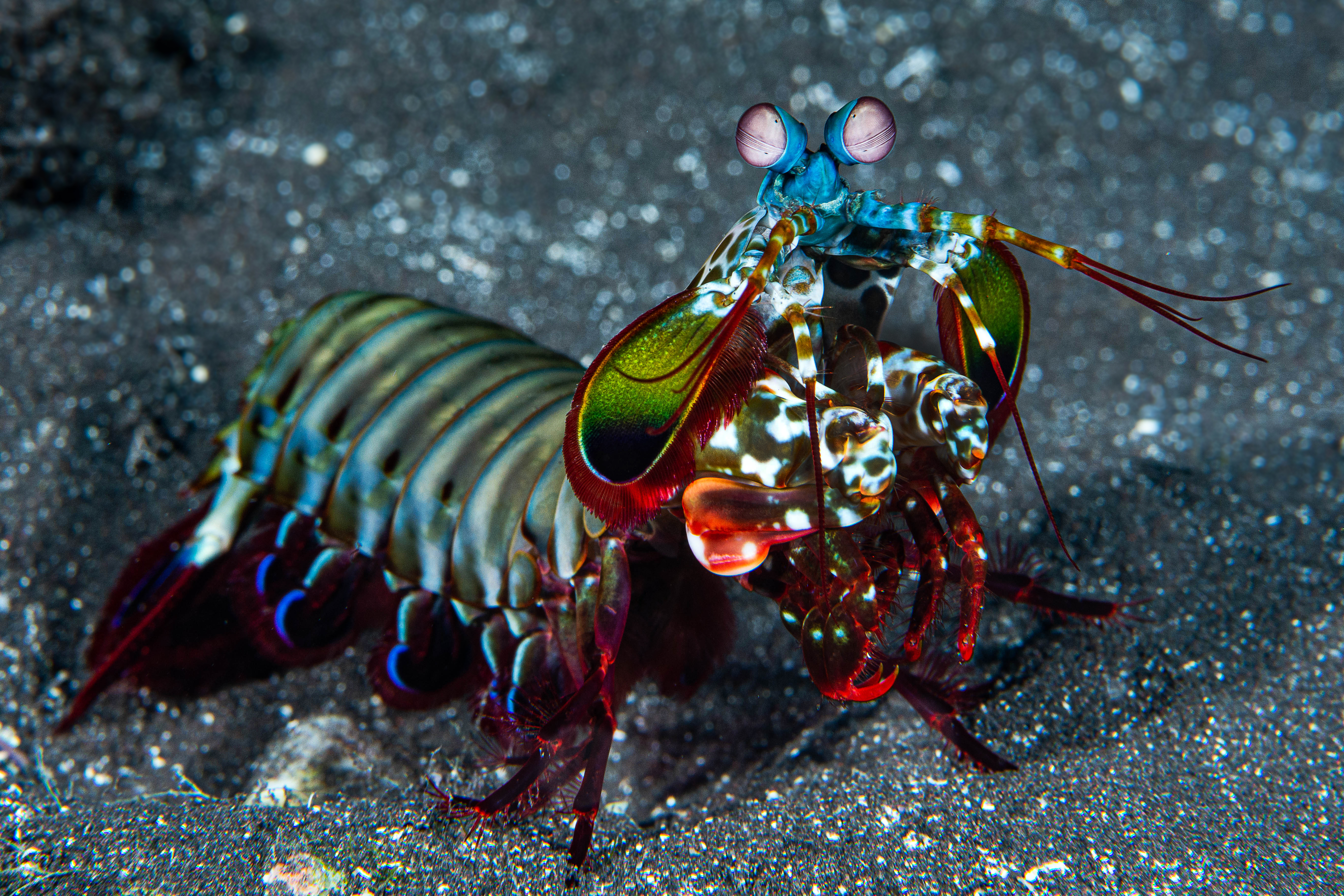
Odontodactylus scyllarus (Stomatopoda)

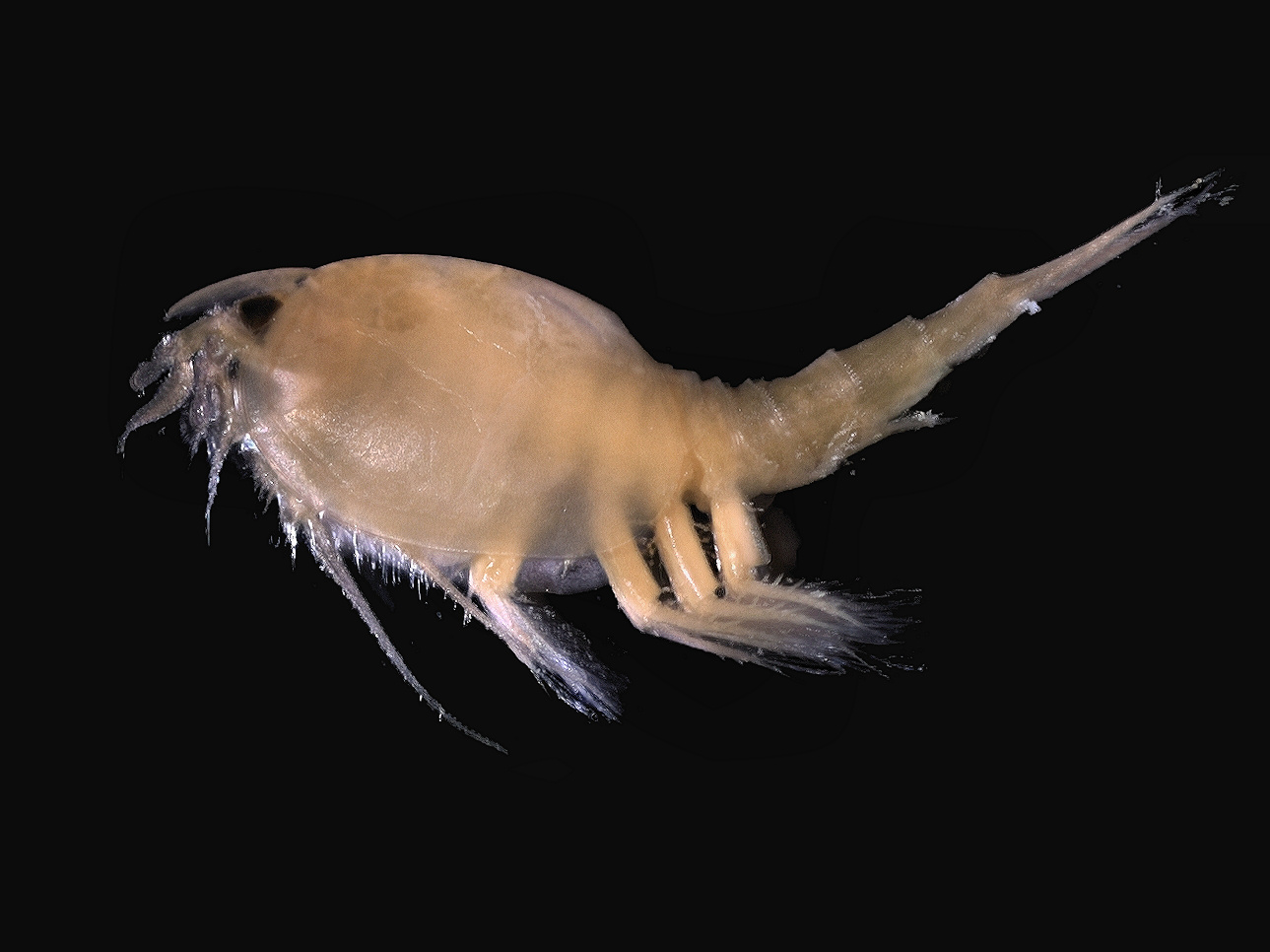
Nebalia bipes (Leptostraca)

== Taxonomic references ==
- World Register of Marine Species : taxon Multicrustacea Regier Shultz Zwick Hussey, Ball, Wetzer, Martin & Cunningham, 2010 ( + class list + orders list)
- Tree of Life Web Project : Multicrustacea
- Animal Diversity Web : Multicrustacea
- Catalog of Life : Multicrustacea
- IUCN : taxon Multicrustacea

== Notes and references ==
1. ↑ World Register of Marine Species, accessed 13 April 2016
