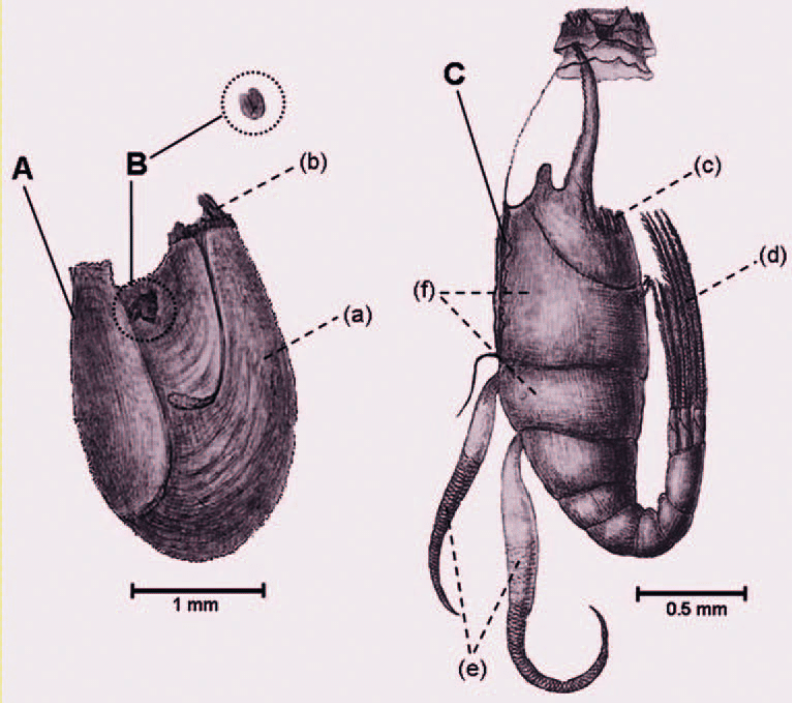

Scientific classification
- Kingdom: Animalia
- Phylum: Arthropoda
- Clade: Pancrustacea
- Class: Thecostraca
- Subclass: Cirripedia
- Order: Cryptophialida
- Family: Cryptophialidae
- Genus: Cryptophialus
- Species: C. minutus

Binomial name
- Cryptophialus minutus Darwin, 1854

= Cryptophialus minutus =

Species of barnacle

Cryptophialus minutus is a species of barnacle. One cluster in particular, dubbed Mr. Arthrobalanus, is notable for being the impetus for Charles Darwin's "Cirripedia project" and obsession with barnacles.

== Description ==
Cryptophialus minutus is a small (2 mm) cirripede that has no shell. It mechanically burrows into the shell of host organisms such as Concholepas peruviana. Unlike many barnacle species, C. minutus is not hermaphroditic. Males are much reduced, one-tenth the size of females, and missing features such as a head and stomach. Males serve little purpose besides reproduction.

== Mr. Arthrobalanus ==
Mr. Arthrobalanus was the name given to a colony of C. minutus that Darwin collected off the coast of Chile in 1835. He referred to it as his "little monster" as he was vexxed by the taxonomy of the species. He published his initial examination in 1846. When Darwin requested other barnacle specimens from research institutions to compare to Mr. Anthrobalanus, he realized the existing work on the subject was insufficient. As a result, Darwin decided to circumscribe the broader taxa. Invested deeply in the work, he continued his efforts against the recommendation of his doctors after his health began to fail. He finally returned to Mr. Arthrobalanus in 1853. It was formally described in 1854.
