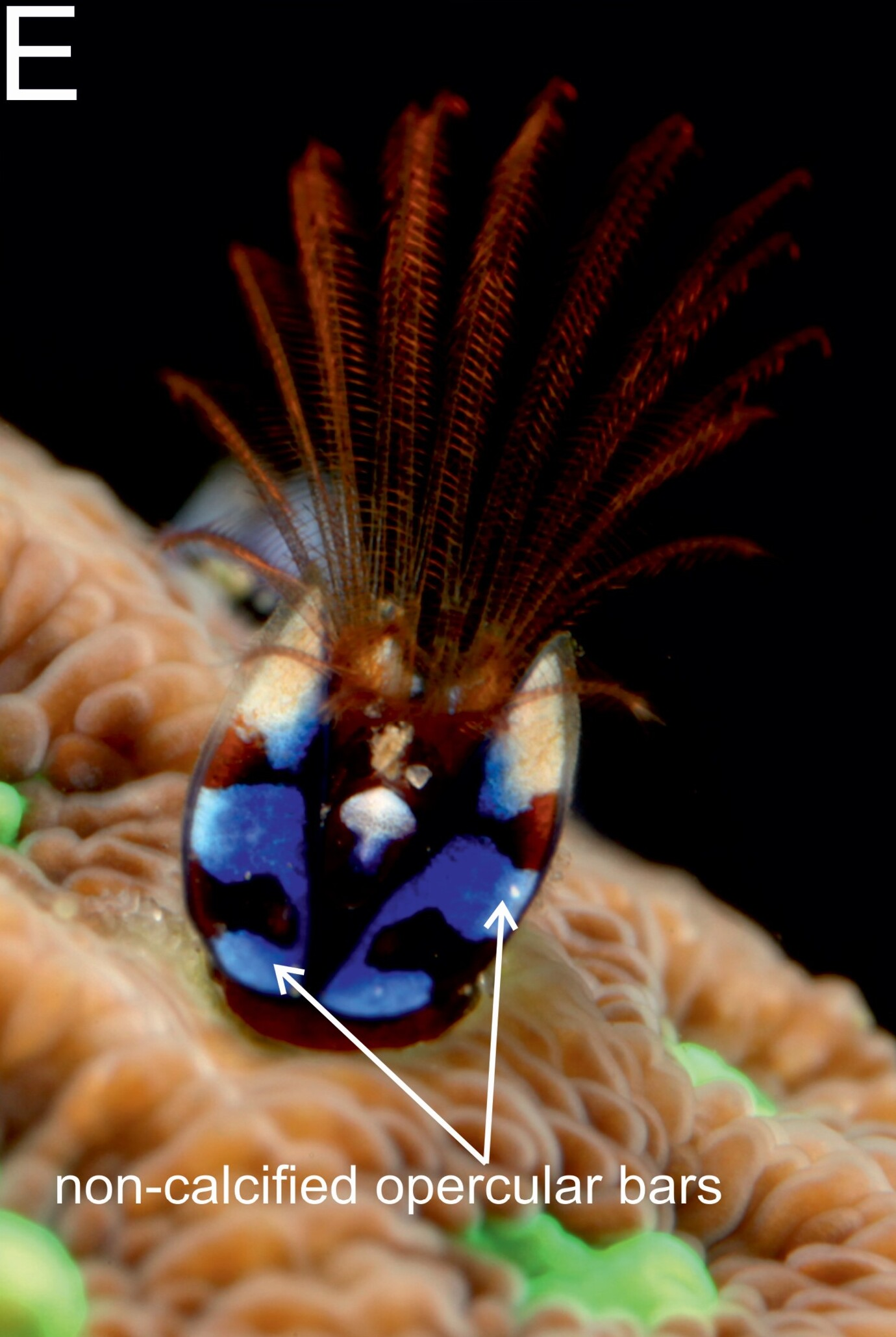
- Berndtia purpurea extending its cirri from the burrow inside the live tissue of its Leptastrea coral host.

Scientific classification
- Kingdom: Animalia
- Phylum: Arthropoda
- Clade: Pancrustacea
- Class: Thecostraca
- Subclass: Cirripedia
- Infraclass: Acrothoracica; Gruvel, 1905

Orders and families
- Lithoglyptida: Lithoglyptidae Aurivillius, 1892; Trypetesidae Stebbing, 1910; Cryptophialida Berndt, 1907: Cryptophialidae Gerstaecker, 1866

= Acrothoracica =

Infraclass of barnacles

The Acrothoracica are an infraclass of barnacles.

Acrothoracicans bore into calcareous material such as mollusc shells, coral, crinoids or hardgrounds, producing a slit-like hole in the surface known by the trace fossil name Rogerella. Acrothoracicans are typically smaller than other types of barnacle, being only a few millimetres in length. Being protected by the hard surfaces into which they have bored, they have no solid carapace of plates like other barnacles but have a soft, sac-like body fixed to the surface by a chitinous disc at the front of the head. They have from four to six pairs of feathery limbs, or "cirri", which they project out of their borings to catch drifting detritus for food. The mouthparts consist of mandibles, maxillules and maxillae. One pair of cirri is close to these while the others are at the other end of the body.

The cyprid larva in Lithoglyptidae and Trypetesidae have a well-developed carapace which can completely enclose the body, a developed thorax with thoracic limbs and a distinct abdomen and telson. In Cryptophialidae the cyprid larvae are reduced; the carapace is much smaller, and the thorax and the thoracic limbs are rudimentary. Unable to swim, the Cryptophialidae cyprid disperse by antennular walking.

Each individual acrothoracican is either male or female. A dwarf male is sometimes found attached to the mantle or wall of a female's burrow. The developing larva may omit the nauplius stage, which is always non-feeding (lecithotrophic), but always has a cyprid stage. This has chitinous teeth which are used after the larva has settled to abrade the surface and commence a burrow.

Two orders, three families, 11 genera and 63 species are recognized, and many more species probably remain to be identified.
