= Cumoniscidae =

Scientific classification
- Kingdom: Animalia
- Phylum: Arthropoda
- Clade: Pancrustacea
- Class: Tantulocarida
- Family: Cumoniscidae; Nierstrasz & Brender à Brandis, 1923

Genera
- See text

Synonyms
- Deoterthridae Boxshall & Lincoln, 1987

Family of crustaceans

Cumoniscidae is a family of crustaceans in the class Tantulocarida, classified under the superclass Multicrustacea. The family was previously known as Deoterthridae, but Cumoniscidae was determined to be senior subjective synonym.

The family contains the following genera:

- Amphitantulus Boxshall & Vader, 1993
- Aphotocentor Huys, 1991
- Arcticotantulus Kornev, Tchesunov & Rybnikov, 2004
- Boreotantulus Huys & Boxshall, 1988
- Campyloxiphos Huys, 1991
- Coralliotantulus Huys, 1991
- Cumoniscus Bonnier, 1903
- Deoterthron Bradford & Hewitt, 1980
- Dicrotrichura Huys, 1989
- Itoitantulus Huys, Ohtsuka Boxshall & Itô, 1992
- Tantulacus Huys, Andersen & Kristensen, 1992

The genus Onceroxenus Boxshall & Lincoln, 1987 was previously place in this family but is now placed in the monotypic family Onceroxenidae.
