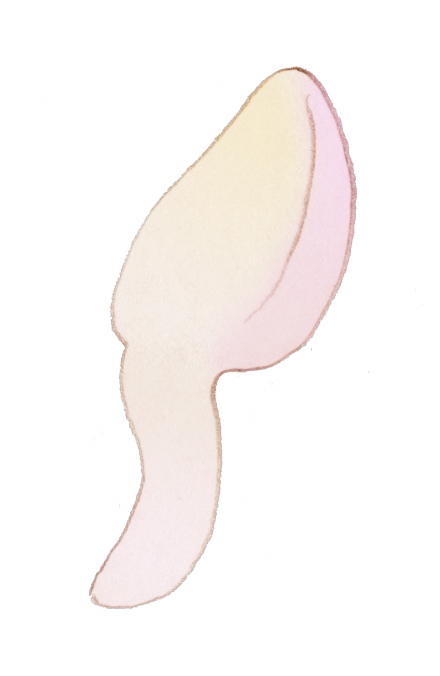

Scientific classification
- Kingdom: Animalia
- Phylum: Arthropoda
- Superclass: Multicrustacea
- Family: †Priscansermarinidae; Newman, 2004
- Genus: †Priscansermarinus; Collins & Rudkin, 1981
- Species: †P. barnetti

Binomial name
- †Priscansermarinus barnetti Collins & Rudkin, 1981

= Priscansermarinus =

Priscansermarinus Temporal range: Middle Cambrian (Wuliuan), ~505 Ma

Genus of barnacles

Priscansermarinus barnetti is an organism known from the Middle Cambrian Burgess Shale which was originally interpreted as a species of lepadomorph barnacle. Four specimens of P. barnetti are known from the Greater Phyllopod bed. A reflective area originally interpreted as external plates has been reinterpreted as a more complex structure inside the body; Derek Briggs, a leading authority on the arthropods of the Burgess Shale, has questioned its assignment as a barnacle or even an arthropod. The World Register of Marine Species places Priscansermarinus in Multicrustacea without assigning a class or order.

== Etymology ==
The genus name, Priscansermarinus, is a combination of the Latin priscus ("of ancient times"), anser ("goose"), and marinus ("sea"). It roughly translates to "sea goose", referring to the lepadomorph barnacles it was originally assigned to.

The sole species, P. barnetti, is named after Robert Barnett, a member of the Royal Ontario Museum’s 1975 inaugural Burgess Shale expedition, where 62 specimens were discovered in a slab buried beneath scree.
