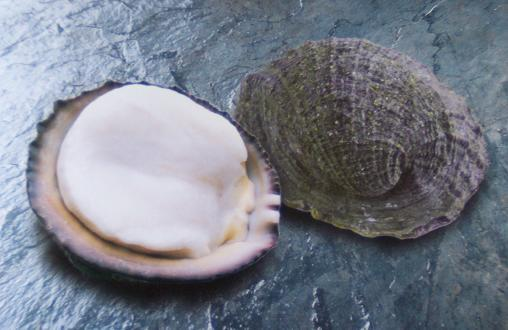
- Two live individuals of Concholepas concholepas; the one on the left has been turned over to show the underside of the large muscular foot

Scientific classification
- Kingdom: Animalia
- Phylum: Mollusca
- Class: Gastropoda
- Subclass: Caenogastropoda
- Order: Neogastropoda
- Family: Muricidae
- Genus: Concholepas
- Species: C. concholepas

Binomial name
- Concholepas concholepas (Bruguière, 1789)

Subspecies
- Concholepas concholepas fernandezianus
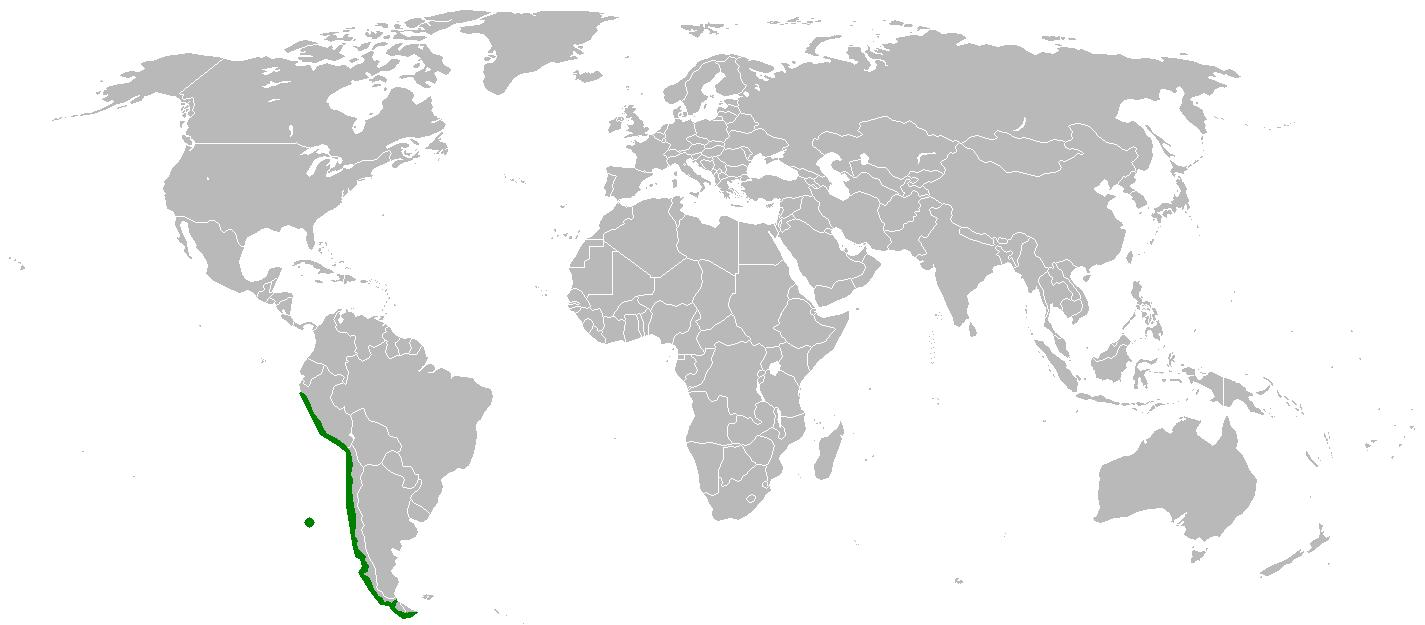
- Range of C. concholepas

Synonyms
- Buccinum concholepas Bruguière, 1789 (basionym); Concholepas decipiens Mabille, 1886; Concholepas densestriatus Mabille, 1886; Concholepas granosus Mabille, 1886; Concholepas imbricatus Valenciennes, 1832; Concholepas laevigatus Valenciennes, 1832; Concholepas minor Mabille, 1886; Concholepas oblongus Reeve, 1863; Concholepas patagonicus Mabille, 1886; Concholepas peruviana Lamarck, 1801; Concholepas rhombicus Mabille, 1886; Concholepas similis Mabille, 1886; Concholepas splendens Mabille, 1886; Concholepas verucundus Mabille, 1886; Murex loco Molina, 1782; Patella lepas Gmelin, 1791; Purpura loca d'Orbigny, 1846; Purpura pileopsis Blainville, 1832

= Concholepas concholepas =

Species of gastropod

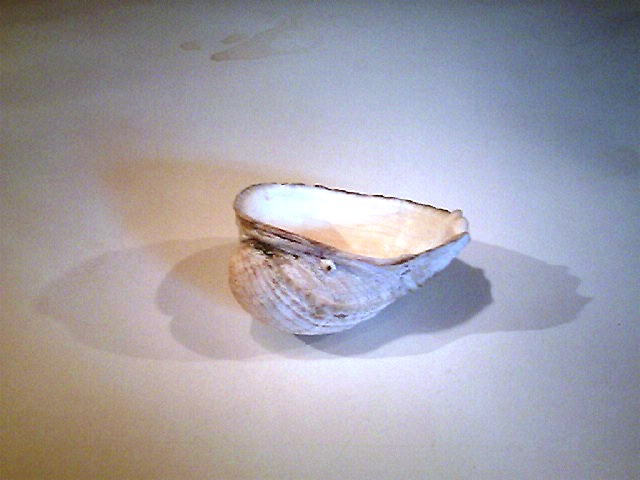
The shell of Concholepas concholepas is used as an ashtray in Chile.

Concholepas concholepas, the Chilean abalone or Peruvian tolina, is a species of large edible sea snail, a marine gastropod mollusk. Despite the superficial resemblance, C. concholepas is not a true abalone (a species in the family Haliotidae), but a member of the family Muricidae, also known as murex snails or rock snails. This species is native to the coasts of Chile and Peru, where it is called loco (a Chilean Spanish loanword from Mapudungun), pata de burro, tolina, or chanque (Peruvian Spanish).

Due to overfishing, the harvesting of this species in Chile has been limited by law since 1989.

== Shell description ==
Concholepas concholepas has a thick, slightly oval, and white-brown to purple-grey shell. Its very few whorls makes it resemble a Phrygian cap in shape. The outer surface of the shell shows strong lamellose ribs of which are both radial and circular-concentric.

The shell is shaped almost like that of an abalone, with a very large aperture compared to other muricids. A loco cannot hide completely inside the shell if it is turned upside down, so has no need of its operculum; instead, it relies on its strong foot to remain in place. The shell is made of calcite with an inner layer of aragonite.

The shells of this species are used as ashtrays in Chile.

== Ecology ==
=== Habitat and distribution ===
Concholepas concholepas is a benthic predator that lives on rocks in temperate waters from sea level to depths of 40 m. Its diet consists of mytilids (such as Semimytilus algosus and Perumytilus purpuratus) and barnacles (such as Chthamalus scabrosus).

Its geographic distribution ranges from Lobos de Afuera in Peru, to Cape Horn in Chile, including the Juan Fernández Islands.

=== Lifecycle ===
Concholepas concholepas is dioecious, which means the populations are divided between male and females, though with no external evidence of sexual dimorphism. The fertilisation in this species occurs internally. In central Chile, females lay egg capsules on low intertidal and shallow subtidal rocky surfaces during southern autumn months. After around one month of development inside the capsules, small planktotrophic veliger larvae (260 µm) are released. The larvae spend the following three months in the water column and once they become competent, they dwell at the sea surface until they settle on rocky intertidal and shallow subtidal habitats down to 30 m. The normal size at which the snail reaches sexual maturity is between 5.4 and 6.7 cm; it takes about four years to reach this size.

Shells of the species are parasitized by the barnacle species Cryptophialus minutus.

== Human uses ==
Concholepas concholepas is used in Chilean cuisine and is commercially marketed worldwide as a delicacy — misleadingly under the name "Chilean abalone". (True abalone are herbivores, whereas Concholepas concholepas is a muricid, a carnivore). Its economic value and ecological importance as top predator have made it the most studied marine invertebrate species in Chile.

=== Commercial fishery ===
On the Chilean coast, C. concholepas is one of the most important edible mollusc species and is a major product of the aquacultural industry. In 1975, about 5,000 tons were extracted annually. In 1980, the extraction peaked, with a catch of 25,000 tons. Since 1989, extraction is illegal in Chile, but from 1992 onwards, some exceptions have been made for accredited commercial divers. The minimum size allowed for extraction is 10 cm. Currently, the only legal way for artisan fishermen or other people to catch locos is to have a Marine Area of Benthonic Resources Extraction permit. Even in these areas, though, extraction is prohibited from December to July from Valparaíso Region northward and from January or February to July south of it. Populations have shrunk and a recent study shows extraction is making an artificial selection to eliminate faster-growing individuals. The same study also showed the populations in Chile are relatively homogeneous with low genetic variability. Due to overextraction, scientists have studied the possibility of commercial cultivation since 1986.

=== Cuisine ===
In Chilean cuisine, the meat of the foot of these snails is cooked and eaten with mayonnaise or as a chupe de locos soup in an earthenware bowl. The chupe de locos typically contains about six snails' feet, 100 grams of a fatty cheese, such as Chanco cheese, two eggs, four spoons of grated bread, salt, and paprika.

=== Possible medical use ===
The hemocyanin found in the blood of C. concholepas has immunotherapeutic effects against bladder and prostate cancer. In 2006 research, mice were primed with C. concholepas before implantation of bladder tumor (MBT-2) cells. Mice treated with C. concholepas showed a significant antitumor effect. The effects included prolonged survival, decreased tumor growth and incidence and lack of toxic effects.

=== Other possible scientific uses ===
Concholepas concholepas shells are a potential proxy-bearer for climate change studies. There are many fossil shell accumulations in Pleistocene coastal terraces. Climate indicators are, by far, less abundant for ancient cold seas; therefore, investigating the ability of C. concholepas will provide valuable signals for long-term evolution of the sea surface temperatures in cold seas, and might be important in reconstructing the El Niño Southern Oscillation (ENSO) history.

Other information

C. concholepas won the Mollusc of the year 2023 competition.

== Sources ==
- (in Spanish) Fishing resources database

Media related to Concholepas concholepas at Wikimedia Commons
