= Doryphallophoridae =

Scientific classification
- Domain: Eukaryota
- Kingdom: Animalia
- Phylum: Arthropoda
- Class: Tantulocarida
- Family: Doryphallophoridae; Huys, 1991

Family of crustaceans

Doryphallophoridae is a family of crustaceans belonging to the class Tantulocarida. The family was previously placed in class Hexanauplia.

Genera:

- Doryphallophora Huys, 1990
- Paradoryphallophora Ohtsuka & Boxshall, 1998
