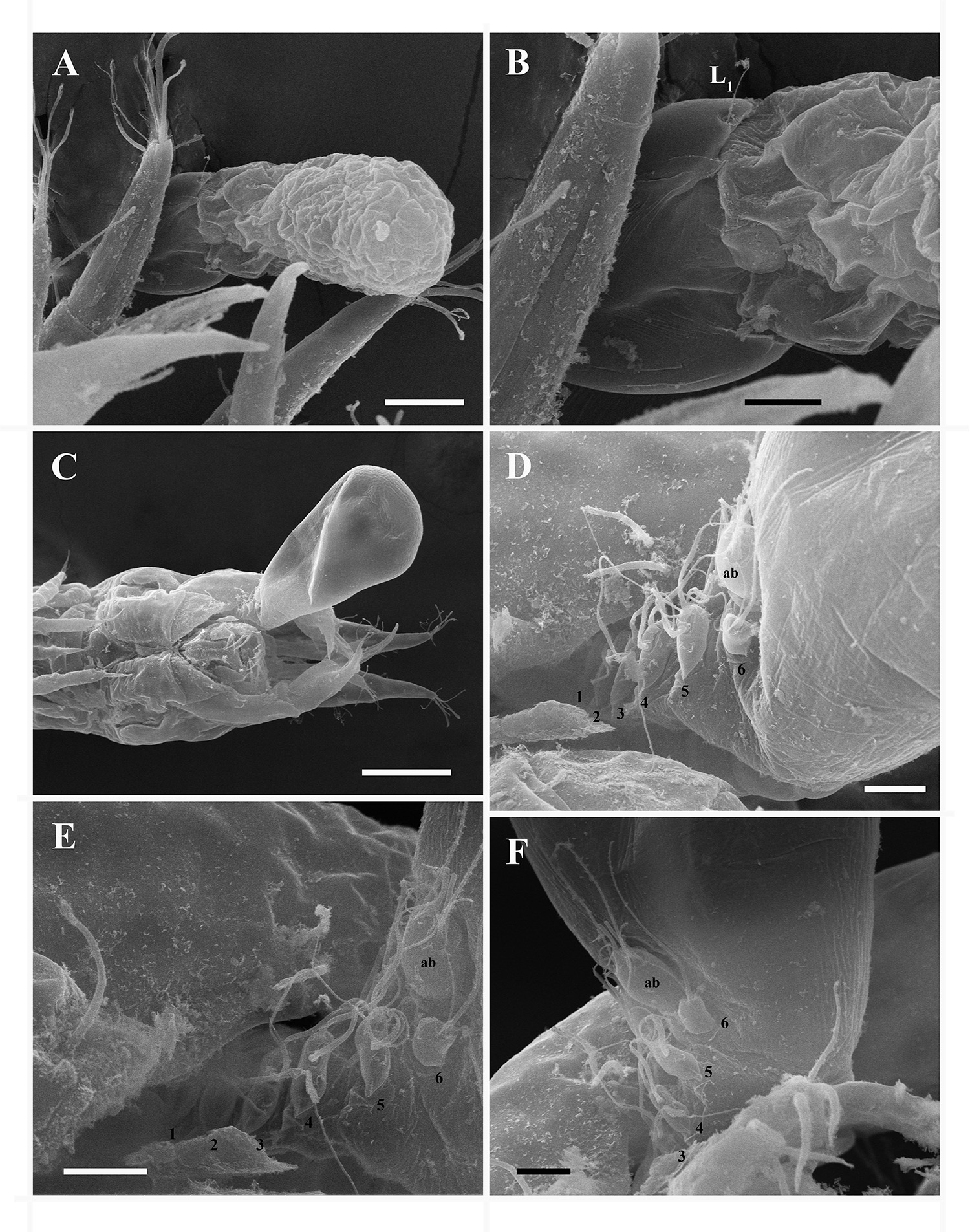

Scientific classification
- Domain: Eukaryota
- Kingdom: Animalia
- Phylum: Arthropoda
- Class: Tantulocarida
- Family: Microdajidae; Boxshall & Lincoln, 1987

= Microdajidae =

Family of crustaceans

Microdajidae is a family of crustaceans belonging to the class Tantulocarida. The family was previously place in class Hexanauplia.

Genera:

- Microdajus Greve, 1965
- Xenalytus Huys, 1991

A third genus, Xenodactylus, is sometimes placed in the family, but its status is doubtful.
