= Stygotantulus =

Scientific classification
- Kingdom: Animalia
- Phylum: Arthropoda
- Clade: Pancrustacea
- Class: Tantulocarida
- Family: Basipodellidae
- Genus: Stygotantulus; Boxshall & Huys, 1989
- Species: S. stocki

Binomial name
- Stygotantulus stocki Boxshall & Huys, 1989

Species of crustacean

Stygotantulus is a genus of crustacean with the sole species Stygotantulus stocki. It lives as an ectoparasite on harpacticoid copepods of the families Tisbidae and Canuellidae. It may be the smallest arthropod in the world, at a length of less than 0.1 millimetres (0.004 in). The specific name stocki commemorates Jan Hendrik Stock, a Dutch carcinologist.

== See also ==
- Smallest organisms
