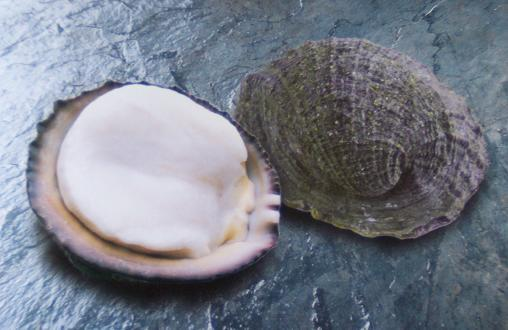
- Two live individuals of Concholepas concholepas, the one on the left has been turned over to show the under surface of the large muscular foot

Scientific classification
- Kingdom: Animalia
- Phylum: Mollusca
- Class: Gastropoda
- Subclass: Caenogastropoda
- Order: Neogastropoda
- Superfamily: Muricoidea
- Family: Muricidae
- Subfamily: Rapaninae
- Genus: Concholepas; Lamarck, 1801

Type species
- Concholepas peruviana Lamarck, 1801

Synonyms
- Conchopatella Herrmannsen, 1847; Conchulus Rafinesque, 1815

= Concholepas =

Genus of gastropods

Concholepas is a genus of medium-sized to large predatory sea snails, marine gastropod mollusks in the family Muricidae, the rock shells.

== Description ==
The shell is ovate. The body whorl is large and expanded. The spire is very short and obliquely inclined towards the left side. The aperture is very wide, slightly channelled anteriorly. The inner lip is flattened. The outer lip shows two small teeth in front.

The only Recent species known of this genus is from Peru. It lives upon the rocks and stones along the shore, and, considering the size of the foot, is, according to D'Orbigny, very inactive. The operculum is very large and thin, and is placed transversely across the hind part of the foot.

== Species ==
Species within the genus Concholepas include:

- † Concholepas antiquata Tate, 1894
- † Concholepas camerata DeVries, 2000
- † Concholepas chirotensis DeVries, 2000
- Concholepas concholepas (Bruguière, 1789)
- † Concholepas kieneri Hupé, 1854
- † Concholepas nodosa Möricke, 1896
- † Concholepas unguis DeVries, 1995

Synonyms

- Concholepas (Coralliobia) H. Adams & A. Adams, 1853 : synonym of Coralliobia H. Adams & A. Adams, 1853 accepted as Coralliophila H. Adams & A. Adams, 1853
- Concholepas (Coralliobia) fimbriata A. Adams, 1853: synonym of Coralliophila fimbriata (A. Adams, 1853)
- Concholepas cuvieri Deshayes, 1853: synonym of Concholepas concholepas (Bruguière, 1789)
- Concholepas decipiens Mabille, 1886: synonym of Concholepas concholepas (Bruguière, 1789)
- Concholepas densestriatus Mabille, 1886: synonym of Concholepas concholepas (Bruguière, 1789)
- Concholepas granosus Mabille, 1886: synonym of Concholepas concholepas (Bruguière, 1789)
- Concholepas imbricatus Valenciennes, 1832: synonym of Concholepas concholepas (Bruguière, 1789)
- Concholepas laevigatus Valenciennes, 1832: synonym of Concholepas concholepas (Bruguière, 1789)
- Concholepas minor Mabille, 1886: synonym of Concholepas concholepas (Bruguière, 1789)
- Concholepas oblongus Reeve, 1863: synonym of Concholepas concholepas (Bruguière, 1789)
- Concholepas patagonicus Mabille, 1886: synonym of Concholepas concholepas (Bruguière, 1789)
- Concholepas peruviana Lamarck, 1801: synonym of Concholepas concholepas (Bruguière, 1789)
- Concholepas rhombicus Mabille, 1886: synonym of Concholepas concholepas (Bruguière, 1789)
- Concholepas similis Mabille, 1886: synonym of Concholepas concholepas (Bruguière, 1789)
- Concholepas splendens Mabille, 1886: synonym of Concholepas concholepas (Bruguière, 1789)
- Concholepas verucundus Mabille, 1886: synonym of Concholepas concholepas (Bruguière, 1789)

== Life habits ==
These animals are predatory, like almost all the muricids.
