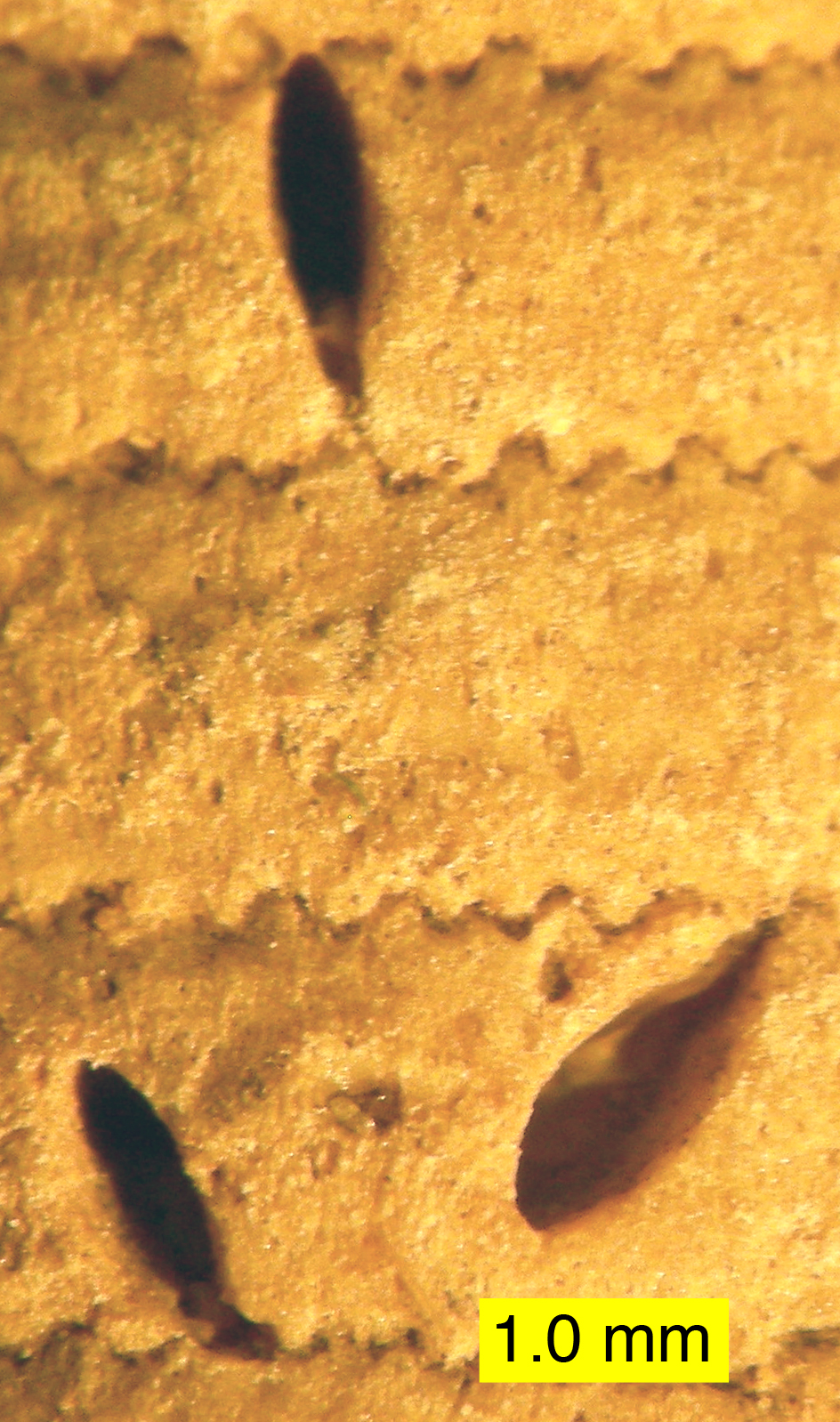
- Rogerella elliptica borings in a Middle Jurassic (Callovian) crinoid stem (Matmor Formation, southern Israel).

Trace fossil classification
- Ichnofamily: †Rogerellidae
- Ichnogenus: †Rogerella de Saint-Seine, 1951

Type ichnospecies
- Rogerella lecointrei de Saint-Seine, 1951

Ichnospecies
- R. arbiglandensis (Smith, 1910); R. caudata Voigt, 1967; R. caveata (Tomlinson, 1963); R. cragini Schlaudt & Young, 1960; R. davenporti (Tomlinson, 1969); R. elliptica (Codez in Codez & de Saint-Seine, 1958); R. elongata (Codez in Codez & de Saint-Seine, 1958); R. lecointrei de Saint-Seine, 1951; R. linii (Hyde, 1953); R. mathieui de Saint-Seine, 1955; R. oostoma (Seguenza, 1879); R. pattei (de Saint-Seine, 1955); R. polonica (Bałuk & Radwański, 1991); R. sacculus (Mägdefrau, 1937)

Synonyms
- Seminolithes Hyde, 1953; Zapfella de Saint-Seine, 1954; Brachyzapfes Codez in Codez & de Saint-Seine, 1958; Simonizapfes Codez in Codez & de Saint-Seine, 1958

= Rogerella =

Trace fossil

Rogerella is a small pouch-shaped boring (a type of trace fossil) with a slit-like aperture currently produced by acrothoracican barnacles. These crustaceans extrude their legs upwards through the opening for filter-feeding. They are known in the fossil record as borings in carbonate substrates (shells and hardgrounds) from the Devonian to the Recent.
