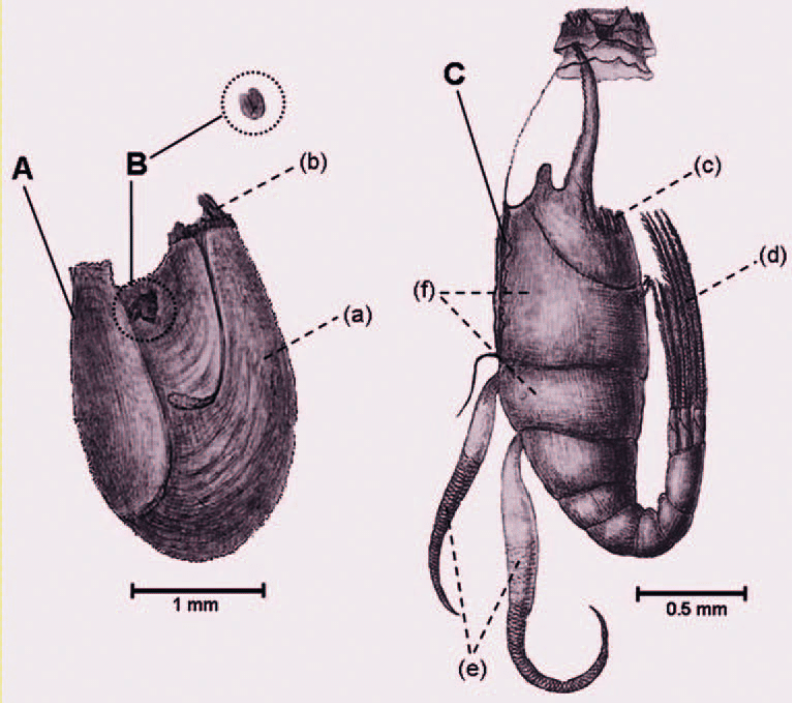
- Cryptophialus minutus

Scientific classification
- Domain: Eukaryota
- Kingdom: Animalia
- Phylum: Arthropoda
- Class: Thecostraca
- Subclass: Cirripedia
- Order: Cryptophialida
- Family: Cryptophialidae
- Genus: Cryptophialus; Darwin, 1854

= Cryptophialus =

Species of barnacles

Cryptophialus is a genus of barnacles. It was described by Charles Darwin in 1854.

== Species ==
As of September 2024, WoRMS accepts 16 species in the genus.

- Cryptophialus cordylacis Tomlinson, 1969
- Cryptophialus coronatus Tomlinson, 1960
- Cryptophialus coronophorus Smyth, 1986
- Cryptophialus epacrus Tomlinson, 1973
- Cryptophialus gantsevichi Kolbasov, 2003
- Cryptophialus heterodontus Tomlinson, 1969
- Cryptophialus hoegi Kolbasov, 2000
- Cryptophialus lanceolatus Tomlinson, 1969
- Cryptophialus longicollatus Berndt, 1907
- Cryptophialus minutus Darwin, 1854
- Cryptophialus newmani Tomlinson, 1969
- Cryptophialus rossi Tomlinson, 1973
- Cryptophialus unguiculus Tomlinson, 1969
- Cryptophialus variabilis Stubbings, 1961
- Cryptophialus wainwrighti Tomlinson, 1969
- Cryptophialus zulloi Tomlinson, 1973
