= Lithoglyptidae =

Scientific classification
- Kingdom: Animalia
- Phylum: Arthropoda
- Class: Thecostraca
- Subclass: Cirripedia
- Order: Lithoglyptida
- Family: Lithoglyptidae; Aurivillius, 1892

Subfamilies
- Berndtiinae Utinomi, 1950; Kochlorininae Gruvel, 1905; Lithoglyptinae Aurivillius, 1892

Family of barnacles

Lithoglyptidae is a family of barnacles in the order Lithoglyptida. There are about 7 genera and more than 40 described species in Lithoglyptidae.

== Genera ==
These genera belong to the family Lithoglyptidae:

- Auritoglyptes Kolbasov & Newman, 2005
- Balanodytes Utinomi, 1950
- Berndtia Utinomi, 1950
- Kochlorine Noll, 1872
- Kochlorinopsis Stubbings, 1967
- Lithoglyptes Aurivillius, 1892
- Weltneria Berndt, 1907
