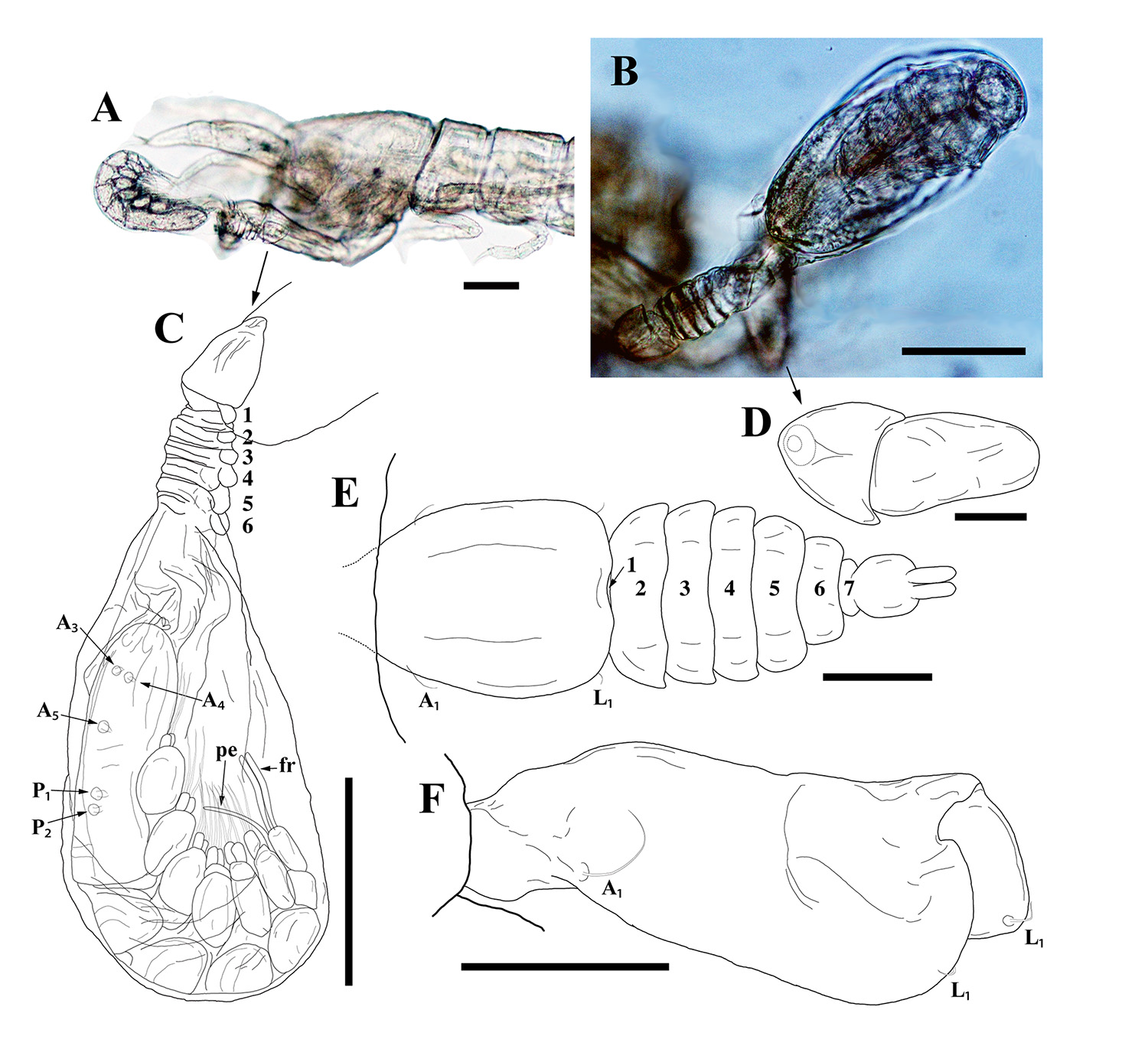
- Microdajus sp.

Scientific classification
- Kingdom: Animalia
- Phylum: Arthropoda
- Clade: Pancrustacea
- Superclass: Multicrustacea
- Class: Tantulocarida; G. A. Boxshall & R. J. Lincoln, 1983

Families
- Basipodellidae; Cumoniscidae (formerly Deoterthridae); Doryphallophoridae; Microdajidae; Onceroxenidae

= Tantulocarida =

Subclass of crustaceans

Tantulocarida is a highly specialised group of parasitic crustaceans that consists of about 33 species, treated as a class in superclass Multicrustacea. They are typically ectoparasites that infest copepods, isopods, tanaids, amphipods and ostracods.

== Description ==
In the Tantulocarida, animals do not ever present eyes.

The tantulus larvae has a head with a ventral oral disc but no appendages, a six-segmented thorax with six pairs of legs, and a limbless abdomen consisting of one to six segments in addition to a telson. The larvae also possesses a cuticular stylet on the cephalon through which they can push a rootlet system for extraction of nutrients from a host. The rootlet system itself is a direct extension of the gut.

=== Body length ===
Members of this subclass are minute – less than 0.3 millimetres (0.012 in) in length and have a dramatic reduction in body form compared to other crustaceans, with an unsegmented, sac-like thorax and a much reduced abdomen. One tantulocarid species, Tantulacus dieteri, is the world's smallest crustacean, with a total body length of only 85 micrometres (0.0033 in).

== Life cycle ==
The tantulocarid life cycle is unique among crustaceans. The tantulus larva transforms directly from a non-feeding (lecithotrophic) and free-swimming organism into a parasite without any instars. When entering the parasitic stage much of the body, such as the muscles, degenerates, even if the body itself becomes bigger. As a parasite it is permanently attached to its host, and after piercing its host's cuticle with an unpaired stylet, a rootlet system used to absorb nutrients enters through the hole and grow into the host's tissue. The adult form develops inside the larva, and can become either a sac-like parthenogenetic female, or a fully developed free-living, non-feeding and sexually-reproducing male or female. The eggs inside the parthenogenetic female are eventually released as fully developed tantulus larvae. The finding of what appears to be a benthic non-feeding nauplius larva suggests that eggs produced by sexual females hatch as nauplii instead of tantulus larvae. Both the parthenogenetic and sexual females are semelparous.

== Classification ==
Five families are recognised:

Basipodellidae Boxshall & Lincoln, 1983:

- Basipodella Becker, 1975
- Hypertantulus Ohtsuka & Boxshall, 1998
- Nipponotantulus Huys, Ohtsuka & Boxshall, 1994
- Polynyapodella Huys, Møberg & Kristensen, 1997
- Rimitantulus Huys & Conroy-Dalton, 1997
- Serratotantulus Savchenko & Kolbasov, 2009
- Stygotantulus Boxshall & Huys, 1989

Doryphallophoridae Huys, 1991:

- Doryphallophora Huys, 1990
- Paradoryphallophora Ohtsuka & Boxshall, 1998

Microdajidae Boxshall & Lincoln, 1987:

- Microdajus Greve, 1965
- Xenalytus Huys, 1991

Cumoniscidae Nierstrasz & Brender à Brandis, 1923 (formerly family Deoterthridae:

- Amphitantulus Boxshall & Vader, 1993
- Aphotocentor Huys, 1991
- Arcticotantulus Kornev, Tchesunov & Rybnikov, 2004
- Boreotantulus Huys & Boxshall, 1988
- Campyloxiphos Huys, 1991
- Coralliotantulus Huys, 1991
- Cumoniscus Bonnier, 1903
- Deoterthron Bradford & Hewitt, 1980
- Dicrotrichura Huys, 1989
- Itoitantulus Huys, Ohtsuka Boxshall & Itô, 1992
- Tantulacus Huys, Andersen & Kristensen, 1992

Onceroxenidae Huys, 1991:

- Onceroxenus Boxshall & Lincoln, 1987
