= Basipodellidae =

Scientific classification
- Domain: Eukaryota
- Kingdom: Animalia
- Phylum: Arthropoda
- Class: Tantulocarida
- Family: Basipodellidae

Family of crustaceans

Basipodellidae is a family of crustaceans belonging to the class Tantulocarida.

Genera:

- Basipodella Becker, 1975
- Hypertantulus Ohtsuka & Boxshall, 1998
- Nipponotantulus Huys, Ohtsuka & Boxshall, 1994
- Polynyapodella Huys, Møbjerg & Kristensen, 1997
- Rimitantulus Huys & Conroy-Dalton, 1997
- Serratotantulus Savchenko & Kolbasov, 2009
- Stygotantulus Boxshall & Huys, 1989
