= Lithoglyptida =

Scientific classification
- Kingdom: Animalia
- Phylum: Arthropoda
- Class: Thecostraca
- Subclass: Cirripedia
- Infraclass: Acrothoracica
- Order: Lithoglyptida; Kolbasov, Newman & Hoeg, 2009

Order of barnacles

Lithoglyptida is an order of barnacles in the class Thecostraca. There are 2 families and more than 40 described species in Lithoglyptida.

== Taxonomy ==
These families, subfamilies, and genera belong to the order Lithoglyptida:

Family Lithoglyptidae Aurivillius, 1892

Subfamily Berndtiinae Utinomi, 1950

Genus Berndtia Utinomi, 1950
Genus Weltneria Berndt, 1907

Subfamily Kochlorininae Gruvel, 1905

Genus Kochlorine Noll, 1872
Genus Kochlorinopsis Stubbings, 1967

Subfamily Lithoglyptinae Aurivillius, 1892

Genus Auritoglyptes Kolbasov & Newman, 2005
Genus Balanodytes Utinomi, 1950
Genus Lithoglyptes Aurivillius, 1892

Family Trypetesidae Stebbing, 1910

Genus Tomlinsonia Turquier, 1985
Genus Trypetesa Norman, 1903
