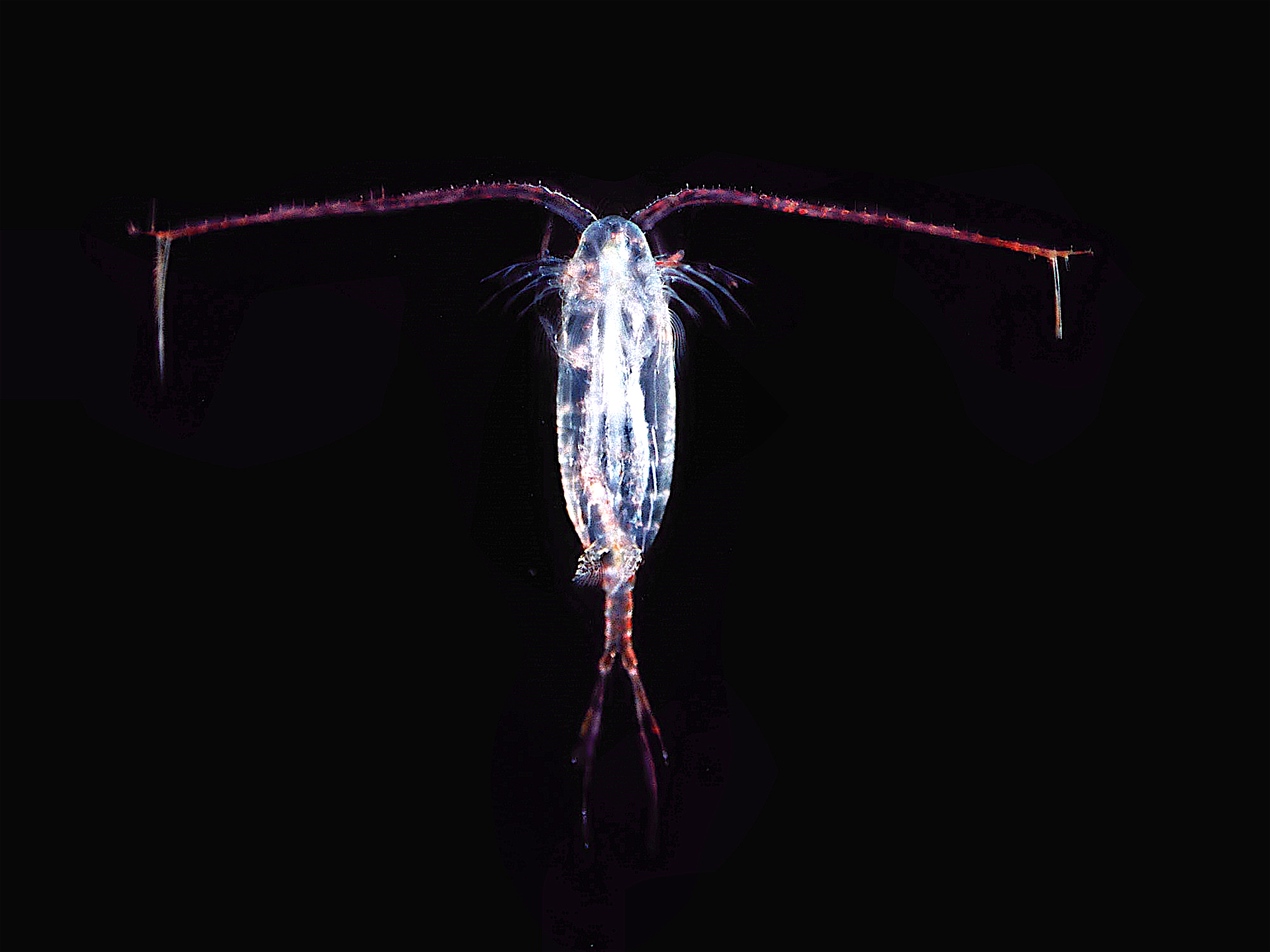
- Calanoida

Scientific classification
- Kingdom: Animalia
- Phylum: Arthropoda
- Clade: Pancrustacea
- Superclass: Multicrustacea
- Class: Hexanauplia; Oakley, T.H., J.M. Wolfe, A.R. Lindgren & A.K. Zaharoff, 2013

Subclasses
- Copepoda; Thecostraca; (?)Tantulocarida

= Hexanauplia =

Class of crustaceans

The Hexanauplia is a clade proposed by Oakley et al. (2013) that constitutes a class of crustaceans, comprising the Copepoda and Thecostraca. A number of recent phylogenomic studies have not found support for this clade, with some supporting the alternative clade of Communostraca comprising Thecostraca and Malacostraca.

== Classification ==
This taxon is no longer accepted according to the World Register of Marine Species (May, 2022). Copepoda and Thecostraca are now treated as classes in Superclass Multicrustacea, along with classes Malacostraca and Tantulocarida.
