= Trypetesidae =

Scientific classification
- Kingdom: Animalia
- Phylum: Arthropoda
- Class: Thecostraca
- Subclass: Cirripedia
- Order: Lithoglyptida
- Family: Trypetesidae; Stebbing, 1910

Synonyms
- Alcippidae

Family of crustaceans

Trypetesidae is a family of crustaceans belonging to the order Lithoglyptida.

Genera:

- Tomlinsonia Turquier, 1985
- Trypetesa Norman, 1903
