= Cryptophialidae =

Scientific classification
- Kingdom: Animalia
- Phylum: Arthropoda
- Class: Thecostraca
- Subclass: Cirripedia
- Infraclass: Acrothoracica
- Order: Cryptophialida; Kolbasov, Newman & Hoeg, 2009
- Family: Cryptophialidae; Gerstaecker, 1866

Family of crustaceans

Cryptophialidae is a family of Acrothoracican barnacles in the order Cryptophialida, the sole family of the order. There are at least 2 genera and more than 20 described species in Cryptophialidae. These barnacles burrow into calcareous rocks and structures, such as limestone, shells, or corals.

Genera:

- Australophialus Tomlinson, 1969
- Cryptophialus Darwin, 1854
