= Onceroxenus =

Scientific classification
- Domain: Eukaryota
- Kingdom: Animalia
- Phylum: Arthropoda
- Class: Tantulocarida
- Family: Onceroxenidae; Huys, 1991
- Genus: Onceroxenus; Boxshall & Lincoln, 1987

Genus of crustaceans

Onceroxenus is a genus of crustaceans belonging to the monotypic family Onceroxenidae.

The species of this genus are found in Western Europe.

Species:

- Onceroxenus birdi Boxshall & Lincoln, 1987
- Onceroxenus curtus Boxshall & Lincoln, 1987
