= Dahlella =

Scientific classification
- Kingdom: Animalia
- Phylum: Arthropoda
- Clade: Pancrustacea
- Class: Malacostraca
- Order: Leptostraca
- Family: Nebaliidae
- Genus: Dahlella; Hessler, 1984
- Species: D. caldariensis

Binomial name
- Dahlella caldariensis Hessler, 1984

Genus of crustaceans

Dahlella is a genus of leptostracan crustacean that is common in the deep-sea hydrothermal vent communities, specifically on the Galapagos divide and Eastern Pacific Rise. The only species is Dahlella caldariensis. It was first described by Robert Hessler.

== Taxonomy ==
Upon the first discovery by marine biologist Robert Hessler, the species was recognized as a new genus and species and was proposed to fit between two families, Nebaliopsididae and Nebaliidae. The species is currently classified under the Nebaliidae family and it shares it along with other genera such as Nebalia, Nebaliella, and Speonebalia.

== Description ==
Dahlella may reach a length of 8.1 mm (0.32 in) from the base of the rostrum to the end of the abdomen. Much of the animal is covered by a large, hinged carapace. Dahlella can be distinguished from other animals in the same family by the presence of a row of denticles (small teeth) on the eyestalks, which it is believed are used to scrape surfaces for food. A similar character is found in Paranebalia (Paranebaliidae), but the form of the eyestalk is very different in the two taxa.

Dahlella caldariensis have long large, curved eyes, a denticulate anterior margin, and small second maxilla according to a study measuring different synapomorphies and Apomorphies of different species in Nebalia and Nebaliidae done by Olesen. Due to their deep-sea inhabitance, they lack a functional cornea and therefore have trouble seeing light from hydrothermal vents. Hydrothermal vents also produce faint light due to its chemical reactions and properties, which also does not make seeing any better for Dahlella caldariensis. The species also has a complex carapace that covers its body almost completely and is not fused, allowing for flexibility and growth for the crustacean. Its flexible body makes the organism more suitable when navigating through hydrothermal vents. Dahlella have leaf-like appendages they use to move and bring food to their mouths when they are close to hydrothermal vents.

== Distribution ==
Dahlella caldariensis has been recorded from a small number of sites around hydrothermal vents in the eastern Pacific Ocean near the Galápagos Islands and on the East Pacific Rise. It is one of the deepest-living species of Leptostraca, having been found at depths of over 2,300 m (7,500 ft).

== Habitat and ecology ==
Dahlella caldariensis' live among deep sea mussels Bathymodiolus thermophilus in clumps and some tube worms along the vents. With their leafy like appendages, they are highly likely filter feeders or at least detritivores when they feel at vents. The species are also secondary consumers, eating the bacteria and detritus that is abundant in that ecosystem.

== Behavior and reproduction ==
This species tends to swim actively like most leptostracans but spend most of their time scuttling and staying on vents.Dahlella do not have a larval stage and when eggs are produced, they are carried inside a pouch in the carapace until the eggs hatch into juveniles.

== Etymology ==
The generic name Dahlella commemorates the biologist Erik Dahl of the University of Lund. The specific epithet comes from the Latin word caldaria meaning hot bath, and is a reference to the natural habitat of D. caldariensis.
