= Warneticaris =

Warneticaris Temporal range: Telychian-Lochkovian, 439-411 Ma

Scientific classification
- Kingdom: Animalia
- Phylum: Arthropoda
- Clade: Pancrustacea
- Class: Malacostraca
- Order: †Archaeostraca
- Family: †Ceratiocarididae
- Genus: †Warneticaris; Racheboeuf, 1994

Extinct genus of crustaceans

Warneticaris is a genus of extinct large phyllocarid crustaceans. It is known from very incomplete material from the Telychian of the Fentou Formation in Wuhan, China and Lochkov Formation in Europe, consisting of multiple incomplete telsons and a tail piece measuring around 2 cm in length. In Europe, W. cornwallisensis has been found in the Czech Republic which is originally called as Ceratiocaris cornwallisensis. Largest specimen of W. cornwallisensis is estimated to have telson length of 30 centimetres (0.98 ft).

== Species ==
- Warneticaris cenomanensis Tromelin, 1874
- Warneticaris cornwallisensis Copeland, 1960
- Warneticaris grata Chlupáč, 1984
