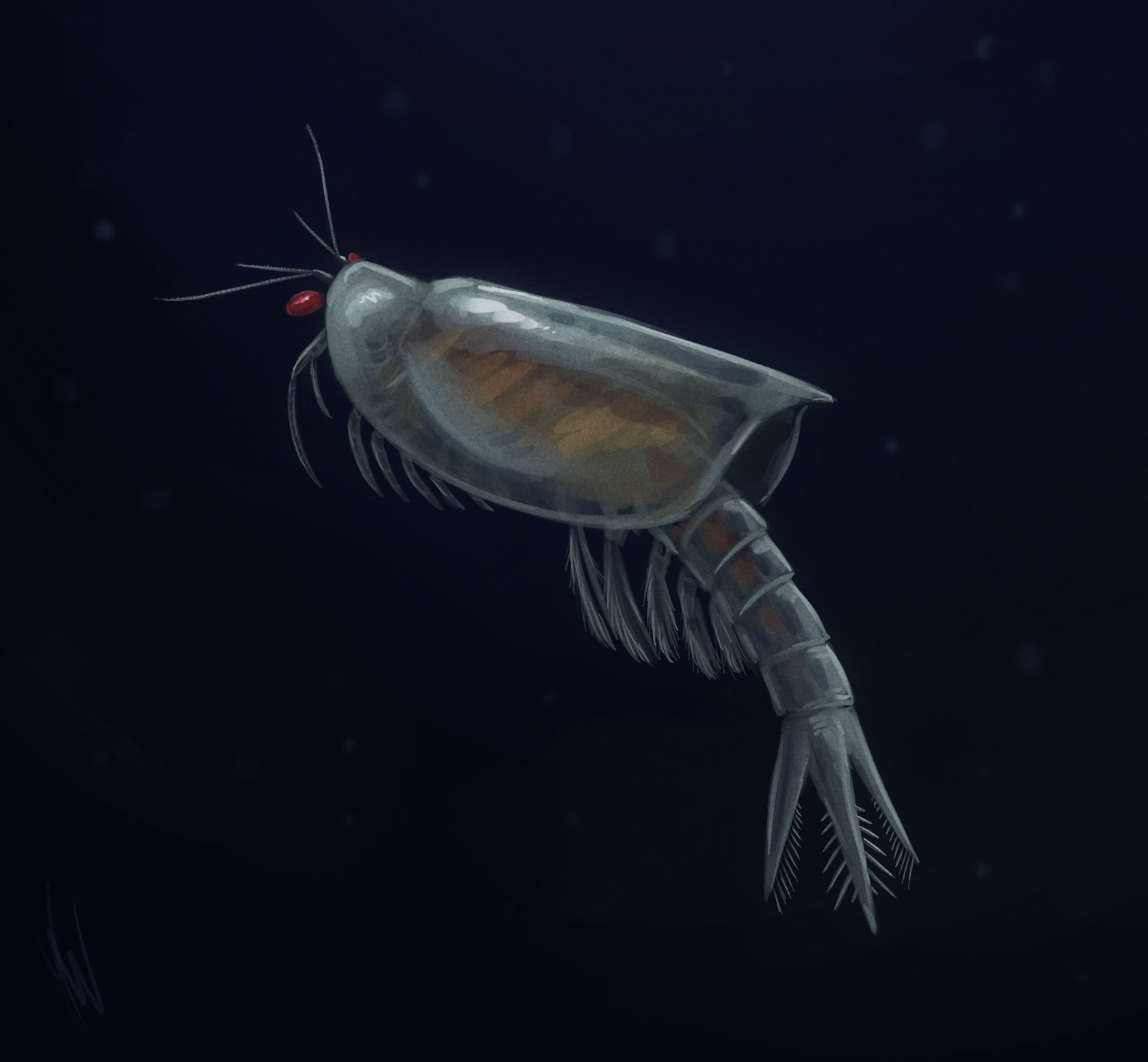
- Cinerocaris magnifica

Scientific classification
- Kingdom: Animalia
- Phylum: Arthropoda
- Class: Malacostraca
- Subclass: Phyllocarida
- Order: †Archaeostraca
- Suborder: †Echinocaridina
- Family: †incertae sedis
- Genus: †Cinerocaris; Briggs, Sutton, Siveter & Siveter, 2003
- Species: †C. magnifica

Binomial name
- †Cinerocaris magnifica Briggs, Sutton, Siveter & Siveter, 2003

= Cinerocaris =

Cinerocaris Temporal range: 425 Ma

Extinct genus of crustaceans

Cinerocaris is an extinct genus of phyllocarid crustaceans known from the Silurian aged Coalbrookdale Formation in Herefordshire, England. It contains the species Cinerocaris magnifica.

== Etymology ==
Cinerocaris comes from the Latin word "cinerosus", meaning "full of ashes" (in reference to the volcanic ash in which the fossil was preserved), and from the Greek word "karís", meaning shrimp.

== Description ==
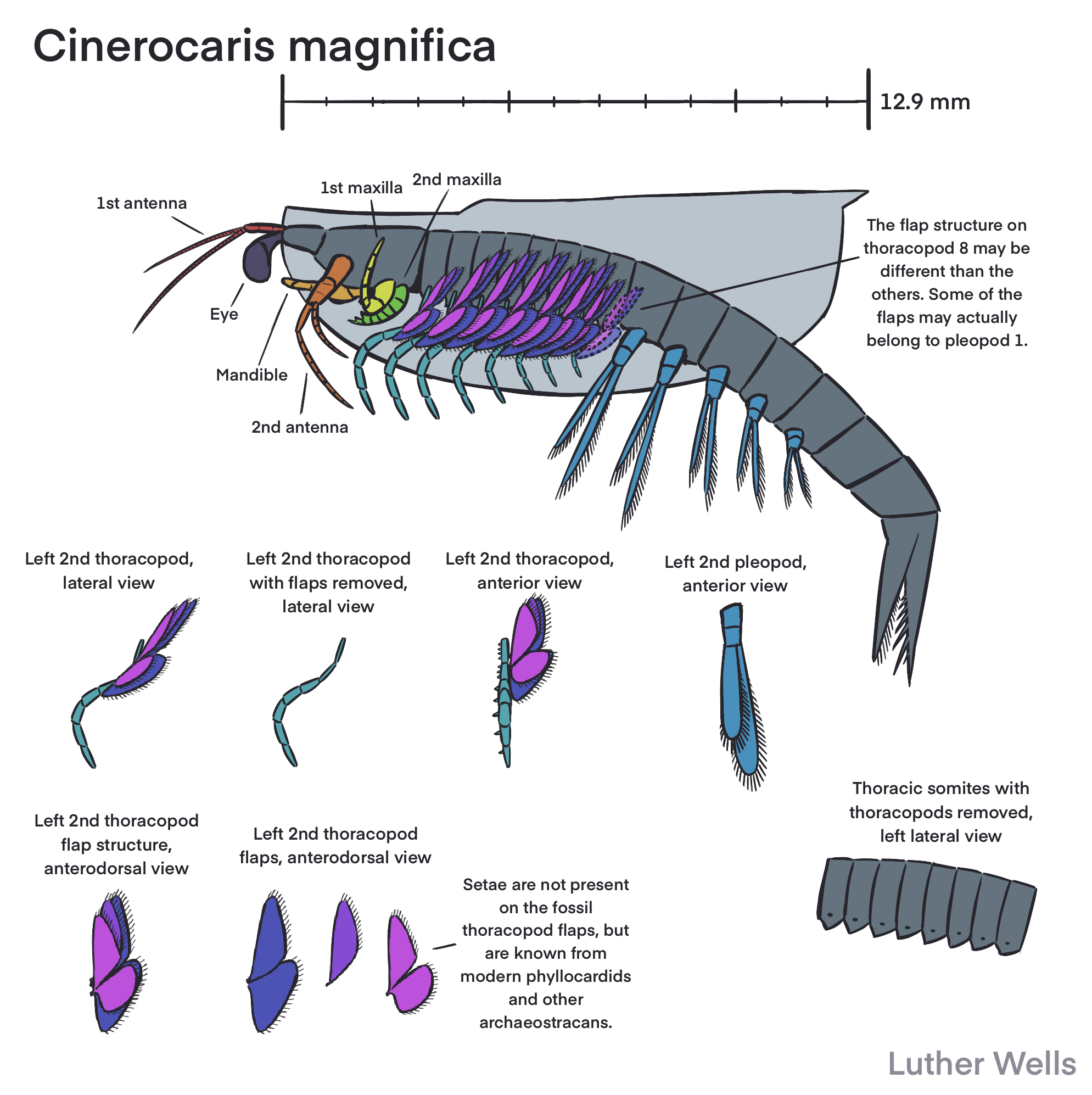
A diagrammatic reconstruction of the anatomy of Cineroceras magnifica.

The head shield is elongated and folded, covering a little more than half of the body. The head shield is 12.9 millimetres (0.51 in) long, 4.1 millimetres (0.16 in) high, and 3.9 millimetres (0.15 in) wide.

It has two large, pedunculate eyes. The first antennae each have two long flagella that were likely annulated. The second pair of antennae are larger than the first and project laterally out of the head shield. The podomeres of both pairs of antennae are not clear. The mandible's palps project between the second antennae. The endopod of the first maxilla curves upwards towards the roof of the head shield. The second maxilla is short and broad, and has 4 medial endites.

The animal likely has 8 thoracic somites, given the 8 preserved thoracopods. The ventral side of these somites appear to have "weakly developed processes", similar to the processes observed in Nebalia.

The thoracopod limb stem preserved 6-7 medial endites, and the endopod had about 5 medial endites, which may correlate to podomeres. The thoracopods decrease in size posteriorly after the 3rd. The limb stem bears several overlapping flaps. These flap structures may be reduced or absent in thoracopods 1 and 8, and some of the flaps that might belong to the 8th thoracopod may instead belong to the 1st pleopod.

The abdomen bears seven segments, the first 5 of which have pleopods with long, oar-like flaps. The pleopods decrease in size posteriorly after the 2nd. The telson is pointed and has 7 pairs of spines on either side. The furcal rami are similar in shape and have about 13 slender spines on their medial edge.
