= Arenosicaris =

Arenosicaris Temporal range: Furongian
- A preserved carapace of Arenosicaris.

Scientific classification
- Kingdom: Animalia
- Phylum: Arthropoda
- Class: Malacostraca
- Subclass: Phyllocarida
- Order: †Archaeostraca
- Family: incertae sedis
- Genus: †Arenosicaris; Colette & Hagadorn, 2010
- Species: †A. inflata

Binomial name
- †Arenosicaris inflata Colette & Hagadorn, 2010

Extinct genus of phyllocarid

Arenosicaris is an extinct genus of Cambrian phyllocarids from the Blackberry Hill site of Wisconsin, and the oldest phyllocarid known. The genus contains a single species, Arenosicaris inflata.

== Description ==
Arenosicaris is roughly 3 cm long, with only the abdomen and carapace known. No head or thorax limbs have preserved, although there are several structures that may be thoracopods. The carapace is ovate to subovate, with possible striations on its surface. The rostral plate is unknown, and no median dorsal plate is present. The hinge line is flat or very slightly convex, with the carapace valves being slightly convex as well. The abdomen consists of seven somites which decrease slightly in width towards the posterior. Somites 1 to 5 have a pair of biramous pleopods, while somites 6 and 7 lack limbs. The telson and furcal rami are unknown. These pleopods are divided into three sections like most biramous arthropod limbs. The basipod is short and rectangular, being slightly flattened. The endopod is incompletely known, while the exopod is large and U-shaped, decreasing greatly in size near the posterior. No setae are known from the limbs. Arenosicaris is unusual among phyllocarid fossils for its preservation of limbs, if only partial. The thoracopods were likely quite fragile, hence their poor preservation. Arenosicaris's position is currently uncertain within Archaeostraca, although it may be somewhat related to the suborder Caryocaridina.

== Etymology ==
Arenosicaris derives from arenosum, meaning "a sandy place" in reference to the unusual preservation in sand, and the Greek καρις, meaning "shrimp", a common crustacean suffix. The species name inflata is in reference to the uncompressed nature of the fossils.
