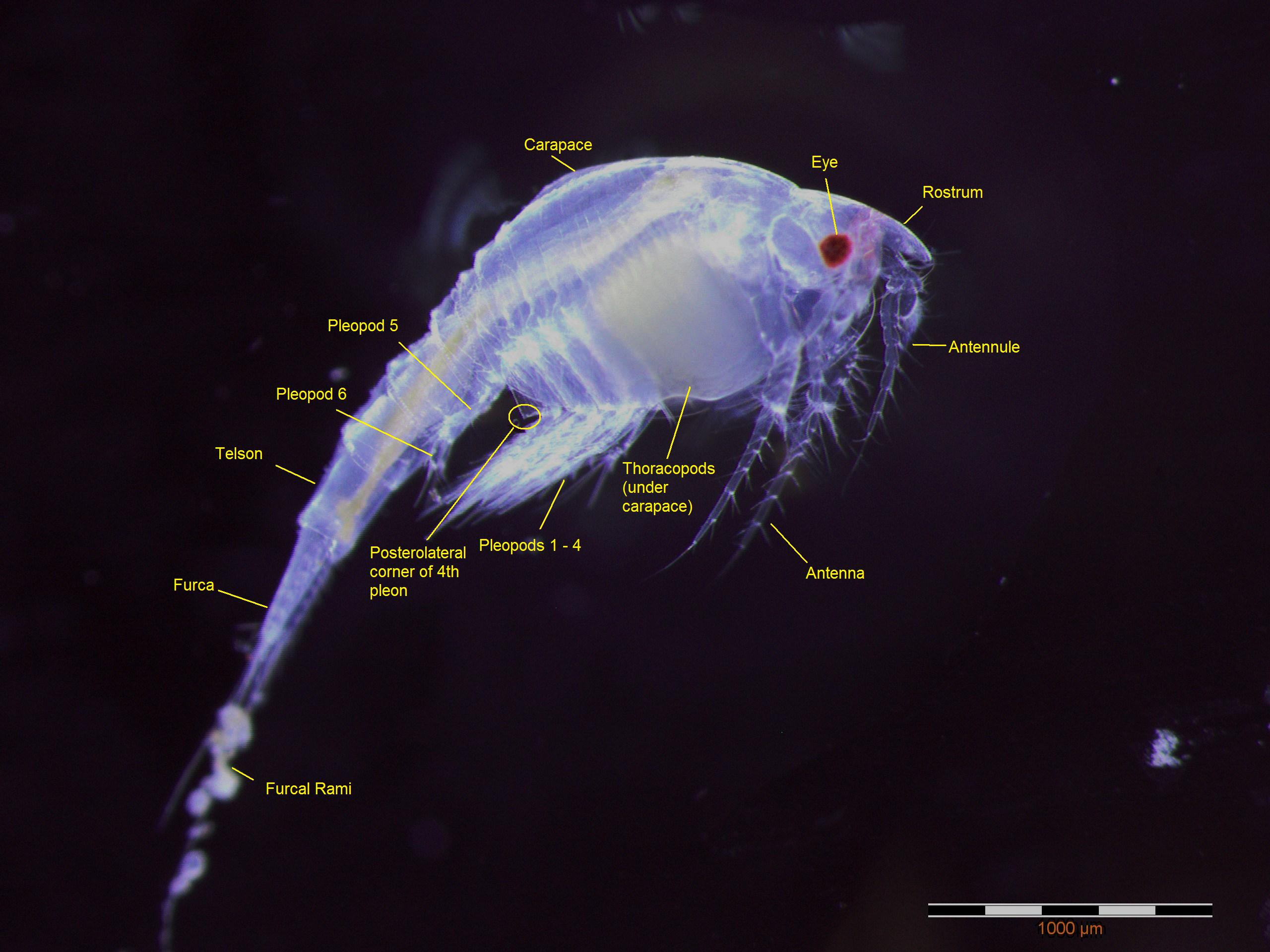

Scientific classification
- Domain: Eukaryota
- Kingdom: Animalia
- Phylum: Arthropoda
- Class: Malacostraca
- Order: Leptostraca
- Family: Nebaliidae
- Genus: Nebalia
- Species: N. herbstii

Binomial name
- Nebalia herbstii Leach, 1814

= Nebalia herbstii =

Species of crustacean

Nebalia herbstii is a leptostracan found in the north east Atlantic, including Galway Bay, Ireland. It is found in the intertidal zone in sandy and rocky shores. Total lengths are usually in the range of 2–6 mm (0.08–0.24 in). N. herbstii can be distinguished from other Nebalia species by a combination of characters:

- The denticles of pleon 6 and 7 are fairly short, rounded to obtusely pointed but never drawn out to acute constricted points.
- The length of the telson is longer than the length of pleon 7.
- A major feature are the anal scales located beneath the telson and furca. They have a short point over the centre of the scale with an indistinct “shoulder” which slopes steeply.
- The thoracopods have endopods which are long and slender, they are distinctly longer than the exopod.
- The dorsal terminal spine of the peduncle is comparatively short, reaching from half to two-thirds of the length of the dorsal spine row of the exopod.
- On the fourth pleopods the posterolateral corner of the peduncle is nearly rectangular, only very slightly pronounced to form an acute point.
- The sixth pleopods are slightly more than twice as long as wide.
