= N. typica =

N. typica may refer to:

- Naenia typica, the gothic, a moth species found in Eurasia
- Nebaliopsis typica, a leptostracan crustacean species
- Nesillas typica, the Madagascar brush-warbler, a bird species found in Comoros and Madagascar

== See also ==
- Typica (disambiguation)
