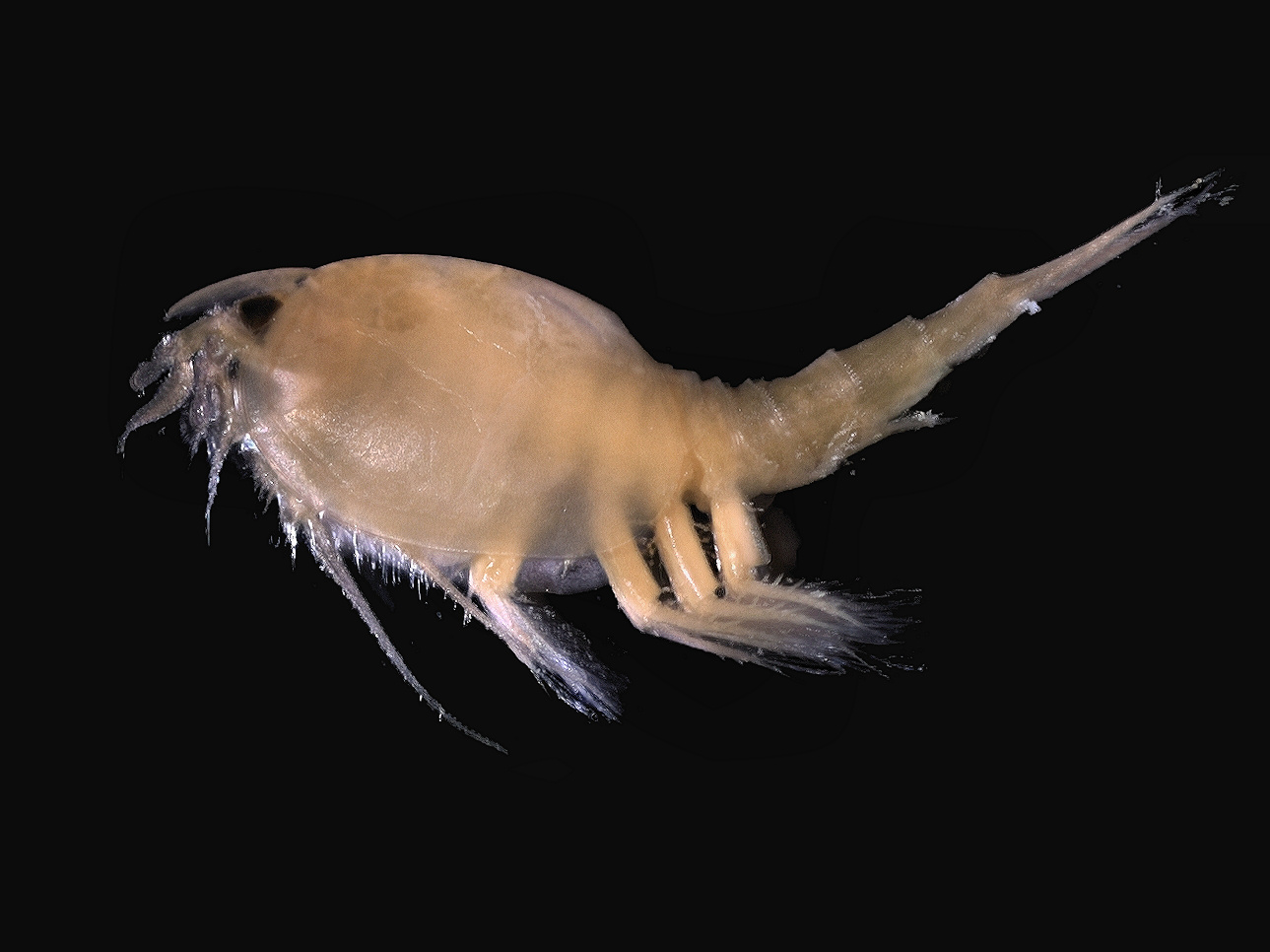
- Nebalia bipes

Scientific classification
- Kingdom: Animalia
- Phylum: Arthropoda
- Clade: Pancrustacea
- Class: Malacostraca
- Order: Leptostraca
- Family: Nebaliidae; Samouelle, 1819

Genera
- Nebalia Leach, 1814; Nebaliella Thiele, 1904; Dahlella Hessler, 1984; Sarsinebalia Dahl, 1985; Speonebalia Bowman, Yager & Illiffe, 1985

= Nebaliidae =

Family of crustaceans

Nebaliidae is the largest of the three families of leptostracan crustaceans, containing 33 of the 40 described species. Its members may be distinguished from members of the other two families by the tapering form of the caudal furcae (which is broader in Nebaliopsididae), and by the callynophores of the antennae in mature males, which are swollen in Paranebaliidae but not in Nebaliidae.
