= Bipes =

Bipes may refer to:

- Bipes (lizard), a genus of burrowing lizards with no hind limbs and front limbs reduced to stumps
- Lerista bipes, a skink lizard species in the genus Lerista endemic to Australia
- Nebalia bipes, a species of leptostracan crustacean

== See also ==
- Bipedalism
