= Rhabdouraea =

Rhabdouraea Temporal range: Permian

Scientific classification
- Kingdom: Animalia
- Phylum: Arthropoda
- Clade: Pancrustacea
- Class: Malacostraca
- Order: Leptostraca
- Family: †Rhabdouraeidae
- Genus: †Rhabdouraea
- Species: †R. bentzi

Binomial name
- †Rhabdouraea bentzi (Malzahn, 1958)

Synonyms
- Nebalia bentzi Malzahn, 1958

Extinct genus of crustaceans

Rhabdouraea bentzi is an extinct species of leptostracan crustacean which lived during the Permian, which is placed in its own genus, Rhabdouraea, and family, Rhabdouraeidae.
