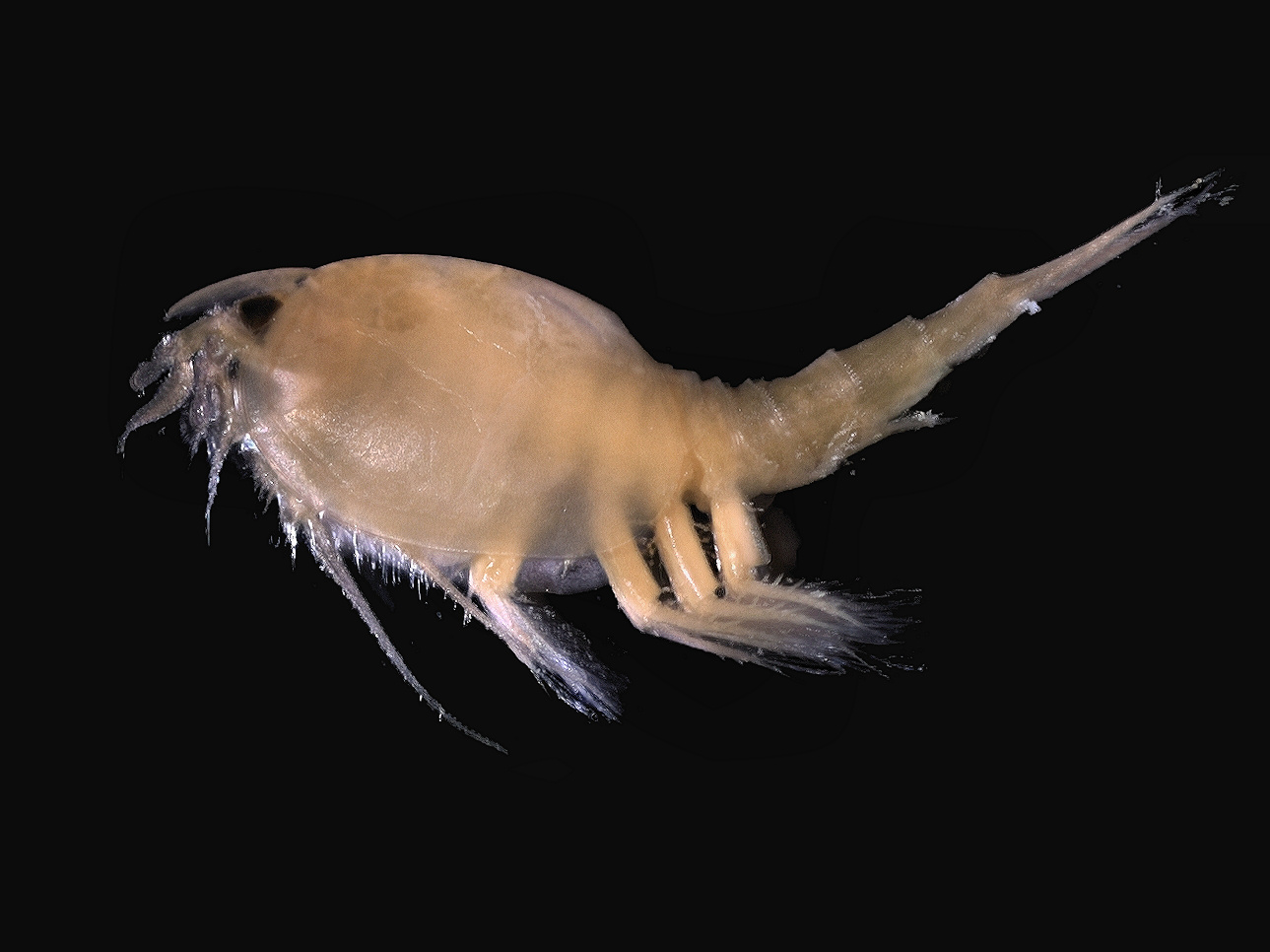
- Nebalia bipes

Scientific classification
- Kingdom: Animalia
- Phylum: Arthropoda
- Clade: Pancrustacea
- Class: Malacostraca
- Subclass: Phyllocarida
- Order: Leptostraca; Claus, 1880

Families
- Nebaliidae; Nebaliopsididae; Paranebaliidae; †Rhabdouraeidae

= Leptostraca =

Leptostraca Temporal range: Cambrian–Recent

Extant order of crustaceans

Leptostraca (from the Greek words for thin and shell) is an order of small, marine crustaceans. Its members, including the well-studied Nebalia, occur throughout the world's oceans and are usually considered to be filter-feeders. It is the only extant order in the subclass Phyllocarida. They are believed to represent the most primitive members of their class, the Malacostraca, and first appear in the fossil record during the Cambrian period.

== Description ==
Leptostracans are usually small, typically 5 to 15 millimetres (0.2 to 0.6 in) long, but the largest species (Nebaliopsis typica) can reach 4 cm, and the Silurian Ceratiocaris could grow to 75 cm.

Diagram of Nebalia reboredae showing the major features of the external anatomy: 1: antennule; 2: rostrum; 3: carapace; 4: abdomen / pleon; 5: furca; 6: telson; 7: pleopods; 8: antenna; 9: thoracopods; 10: eye

They are distinguished from all other members of their class in having seven abdominal segments, instead of six. Their head has stalked compound eyes, two pairs of antennae (one biramous, one uniramous), and a pair of mandibles but no maxillipeds. They are the only malacostracans with a carapace that comprises two valves. It covers the head and the thorax, including most of the thoracic appendages, and serves as a brood pouch for the developing embryos. Its anterior tip bears a movable rostrum. Also unique among malacostracans is their eight pairs of thoracic appendages which have been specialized into leaf-like filter feeding organs, and are not used for locomotion. The first six abdominal segments bear pleopods, while the seventh bears a pair of caudal furcae, which may be homologous to uropods of other crustaceans.

Leptostracans have gills on their thoracic limbs, but also breathe through a respiratory membrane on the inside of the carapace. The eggs hatch as a postlarval, or "manca" stage, which lacks a fully developed carapace, but otherwise resembles the adult.

== Classification ==
It is now accepted that leptostracans belong to the Malacostraca, and the sister crown group to Leptostraca is Eumalacostraca.

The order Leptostraca is divided into three families, with ten genera containing a total of around 40 validly described extant species:

Species	Authority	Date	Family	Distribution
Nebaliopsis typica	Sars	1887	Nebaliopsididae	Southern Hemisphere
Pseudonebaliopsis atlantica	Petryachov	1996	Nebaliopsididae	North Atlantic
Nebalia antarctica	Dahl	1990	Nebaliidae	Antarctica
Nebalia bipes	Fabricius	1780	Nebaliidae	Arctic and sub-Arctic
Nebalia borealis	Dahl	1985	Nebaliidae	north-east Atlantic Ocean
Nebalia brucei	Olesen	1999	Nebaliidae	Tanzania
Nebalia cannoni	Dahl	1990	Nebaliidae	South Georgia
Nebalia capensis	Barnard	1914	Nebaliidae	South Africa
Nebalia clausi	Dahl	1985	Nebaliidae	Italy
Nebalia dahli	Kazmi & Tirmizi	1989	Nebaliidae	Pakistan
Nebalia daytoni	Vetter	1996	Nebaliidae	California
Nebalia falklandensis	Dahl	1990	Nebaliidae	Falkland Islands
Nebalia geoffroyi	Milne-Edwards	1828	Nebaliidae	north-east Atlantic Ocean
Nebalia gerkenae	Haney & Martin	2000	Nebaliidae	California
Nebalia herbstii	Leach	1814	Nebaliidae	north-east Atlantic Ocean
Nebalia hessleri	Martin et al.	1996	Nebaliidae	California
Nebalia ilheoensis	Kensley	1976	Nebaliidae	south-western Africa
Nebalia kensleyi	Haney & Martin	2005	Nebaliidae	California
Nebalia kocatasi	Kocak, Moreira & Katagan	2007	Nebaliidae	Mediterranean Sea
Nebalia koreana	Song, Moreira & Min	2012	Nebaliidae	South Korea
Nebalia lagartensis	Escobar & Villalobos-Hiriart	1995	Nebaliidae	Mexico
Nebalia longicornis	Thomson	1879	Nebaliidae	South Pacific, South Africa, Caribbean Sea
Nebalia marerubi	Wägele	1983	Nebaliidae	Red Sea
Nebalia patagonica	Dahl	1990	Nebaliidae	Magellan region
Nebalia schizophthalma	Haney, Hessler & Martin	2001	Nebaliidae	western Atlantic Ocean
Nebalia strausi	Risso	1826	Nebaliidae	north-east Atlantic Ocean, Mediterranean Sea
Nebalia troncosoi	Moreira, Cacabelos & Dominguez	2003	Nebaliidae	Spain
Nebaliella antarctica	Thiele	1904	Nebaliidae	Kerguelen, New Zealand
Nebaliella brevicarinata	Kikuchi & Gamô	1992	Nebaliidae	Antarctica
Nebaliella caboti	Clark	1932	Nebaliidae	Cabot Strait, New Jersey
Nebaliella declivatas	Walker-Smith	1998	Nebaliidae	Australia
Nebaliella extrema	Thiele	1905	Nebaliidae	Antarctica
Dahlella caldariensis	Hessler	1984	Nebaliidae	East Pacific Rise
Sarsinebalia cristobi	Moreira, Gestoso & Troncoso	2003	Nebaliidae	north-east Atlantic Ocean
Sarsinebalia typhlops	(Sars)	1870	Nebaliidae	North Atlantic, Australia
Sarsinebalia urgorrii	Moreira, Gestoso & Troncoso	2003	Nebaliidae	north-east Atlantic Ocean
Speonebalia cannoni	Bowman, Yager & Iliffe	1985	Nebaliidae	Turks and Caicos Islands
Levinebalia fortunata	(Wakabara)	1976	Paranebaliidae	New Zealand
Levinebalia maria	Walker-Smith	2000	Paranebaliidae	Australia
Paranebalia belizensis	Modlin	1991	Paranebaliidae	Belize
Paranebalia longipes	(Willemöes-Suhm)	1875	Paranebaliidae	Atlantic, Pacific and Indian Oceans
Saronebalia guanensis	Haney & Martin	2004	Paranebaliidae	British Virgin Islands
