= Rostrum (anatomy) =

Anatomy term

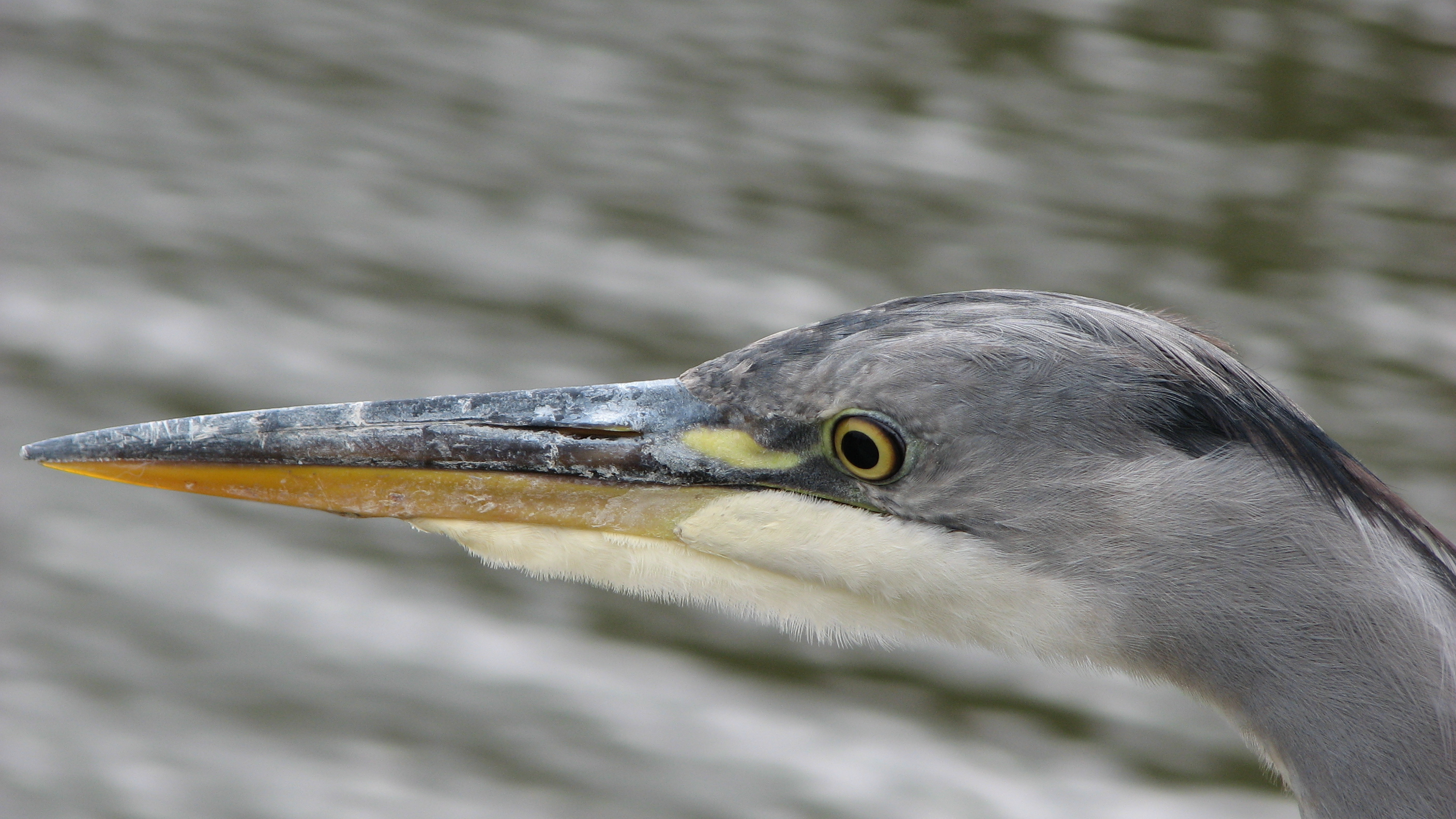
The rostrum (beak) of a grey heron

Rostrum (from Latin rostrum, meaning beak) is a term used in anatomy for several kinds of hardened, or bony, beak-like structures or extensions projecting out from the skull or mouthparts of an animal. Despite some visual similarity, many of these are phylogenetically unrelated structures in widely varying species.

Diagram of Nebalia bipes showing the rostrum at 2

== Invertebrates ==
- In spiders, the rostrum is a part of the mouth of which it borders the opening in front. Homologous of an upper lip, this outgrowth is especially characterised by the presence of a pocket-shaped secreting organ, the rostral gland, accessible by the sole means of histology and electron microscopy (external link "archentoflor").
- In crustaceans, the rostrum is the forward extension of the carapace in front of the eyes. It is generally a rigid structure, but can be connected by a hinged joint, as seen in Leptostraca.
- Among insects, the rostrum is the name for the piercing mouthparts of the order Hemiptera as well as those of the snow scorpionflies, among many others. The long snout of weevils is also called a rostrum.
- Gastropod molluscs have a rostrum or proboscis.
- Cephalopod molluscs have hard beak-like mouthparts referred to as the rostrum.
Invertebrate rostrums

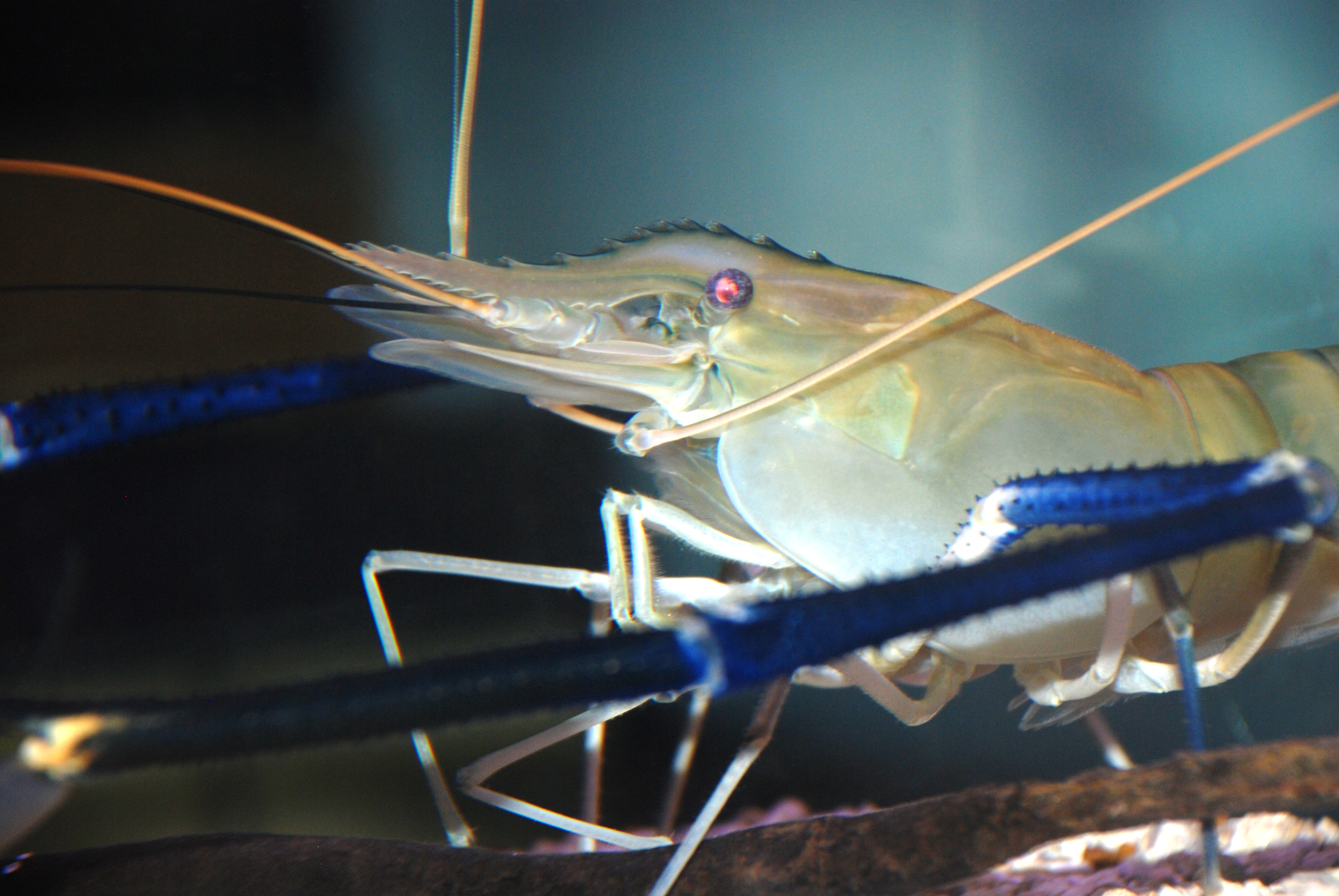
Crustacean: the rostrum of the shrimp Macrobrachium rosenbergii is serrated along both edges.

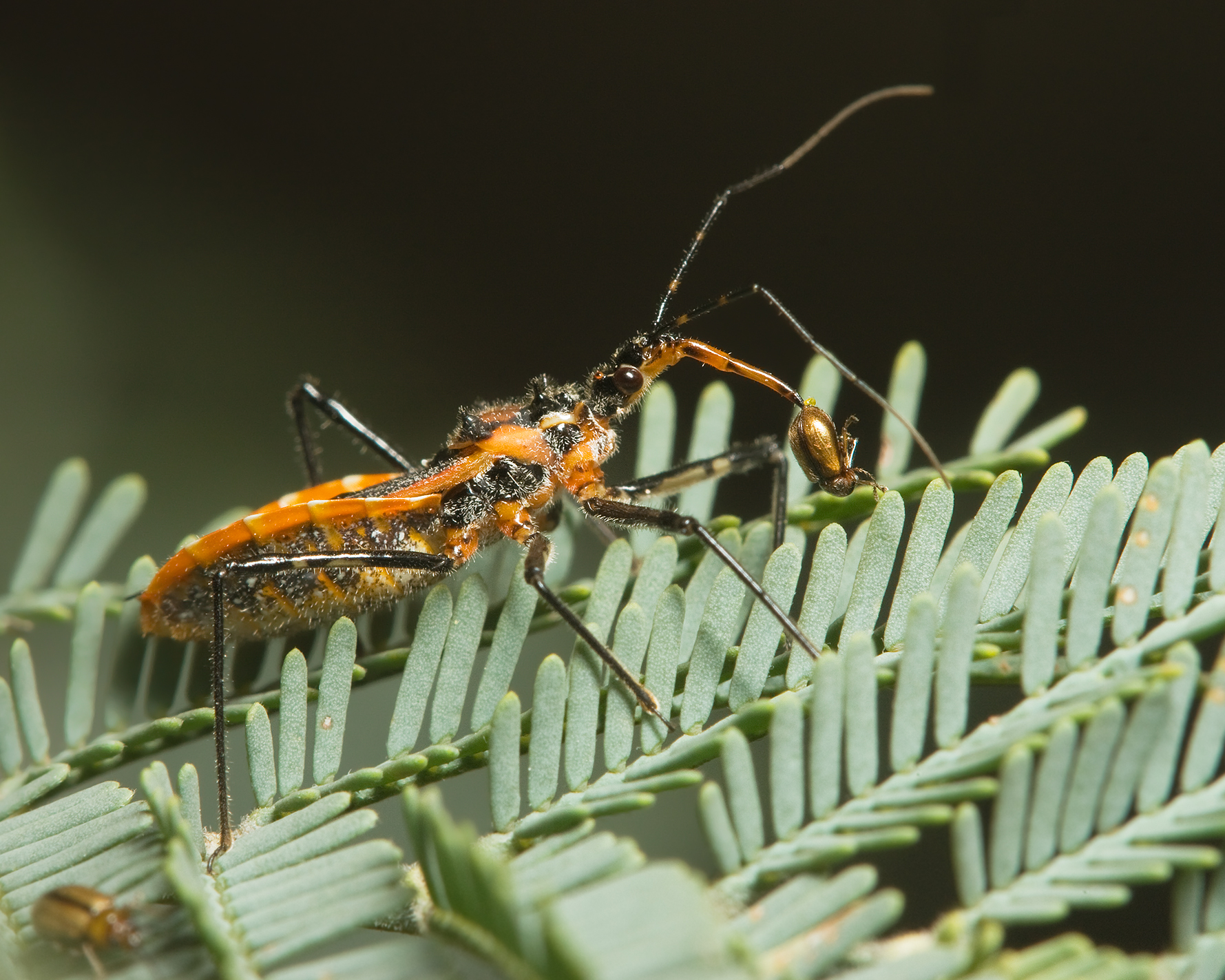
Insect: assassin bug piercing its prey with its rostrum

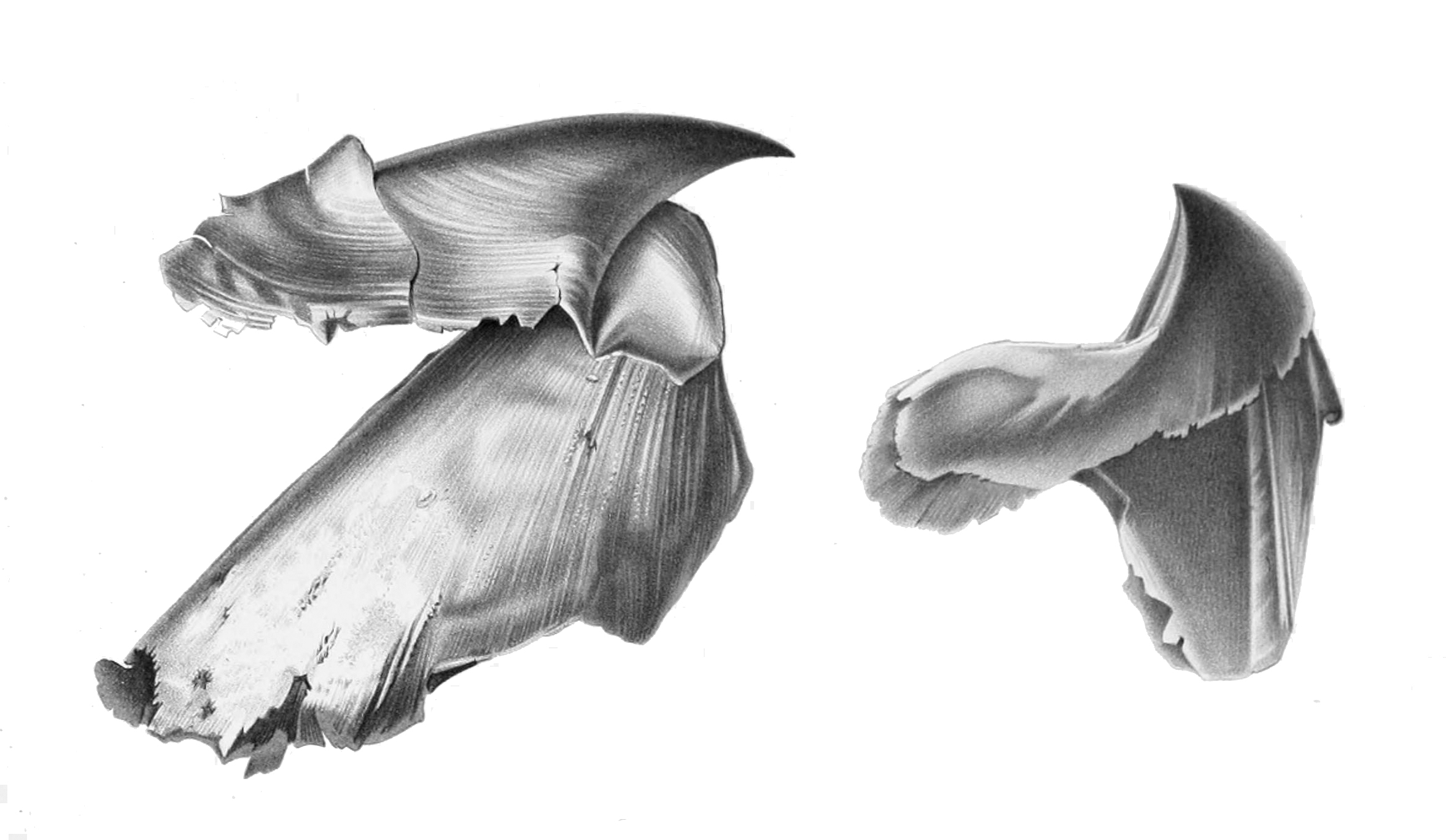
Cephalopod: the two-part beak of a giant squid

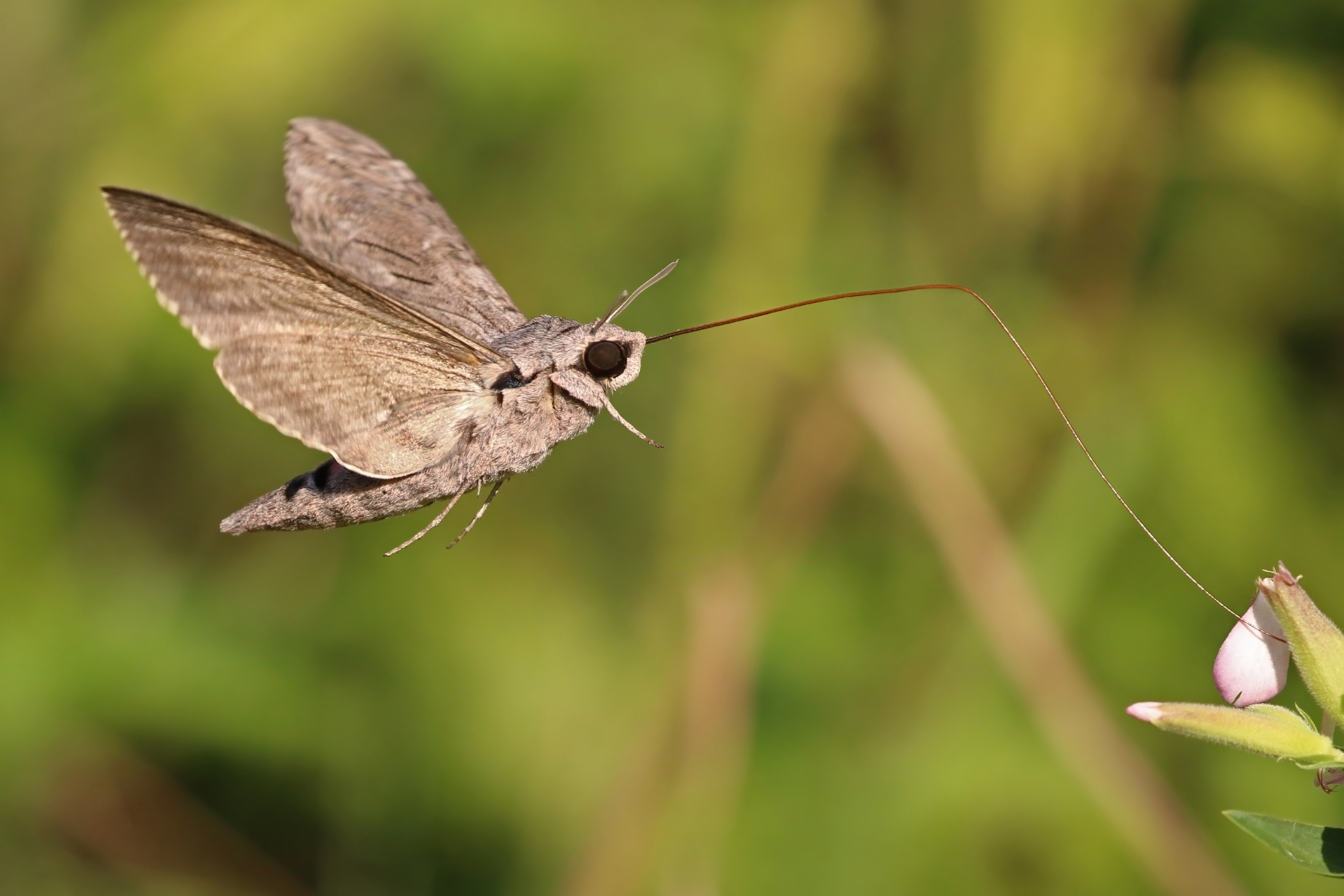
Proboscis of hawk-moth (Agrius convolvuli)

== Vertebrates ==
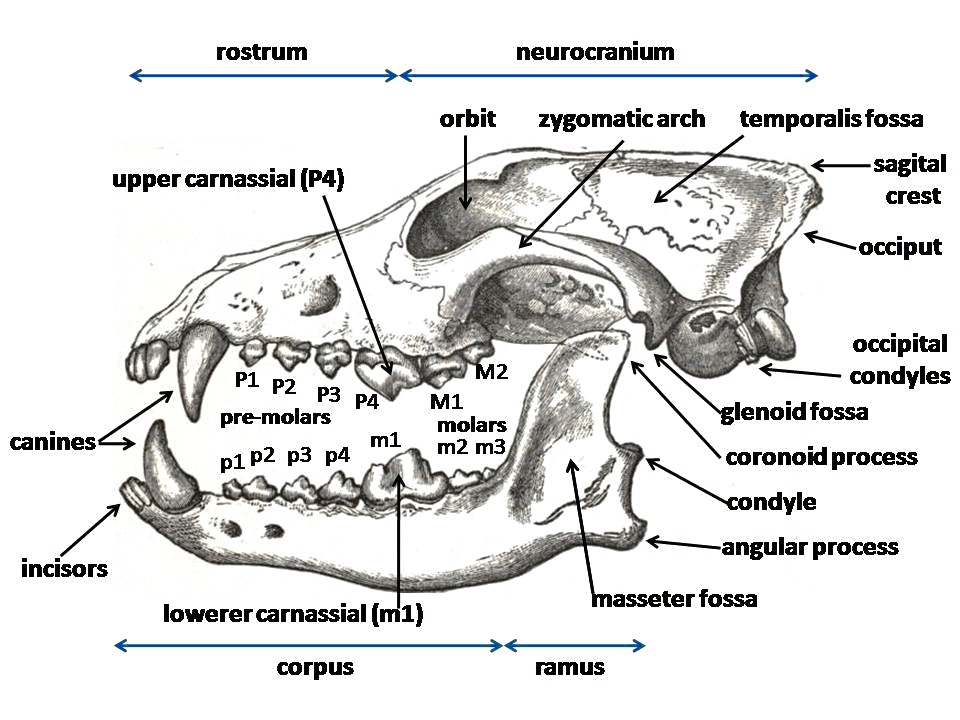
Diagram of a wolf skull with key features labelled

In mammals, the rostrum is that part of the cranium located in front of the zygomatic arches, where it holds the teeth, palate, and nasal cavity. Additionally, the corpus callosum of the human brain has a nerve tract known as the rostrum.

The beak or snout of a vertebrate may also be referred to as the rostrum.

- Some cetaceans, including toothed whales such as dolphins and beaked whales, have rostrums (beaks) which evolved from their jawbones. The narwhal possesses a large rostrum (tusk) which evolved from a protruding canine tooth.
- Some fish have permanently protruding rostrums which evolved from their upper jawbones. Billfish (marlin, swordfish and sailfish) use rostrums (bills) to slash and stun prey. Paddlefish, goblin sharks and hammerhead sharks have rostrums packed with electroreceptors which signal the presence of prey by detecting weak electrical fields. Sawsharks and the critically endangered sawfish have rostrums (saws) which are both electro-sensitive and used for slashing. The rostrums extend ventrally in front of the fish. In the case of hammerheads the rostrum (hammer) extends both ventrally and laterally (sideways).
The upper jawbones of some fish have evolved into rostrums

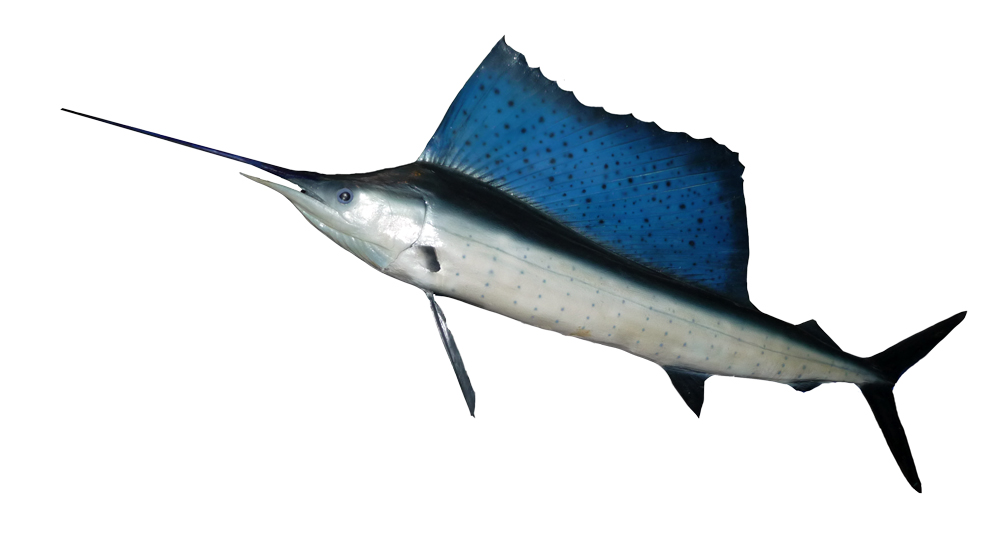
Sailfish, like all billfish, have a rostrum (bill) which is an extension of their upper jawbone.

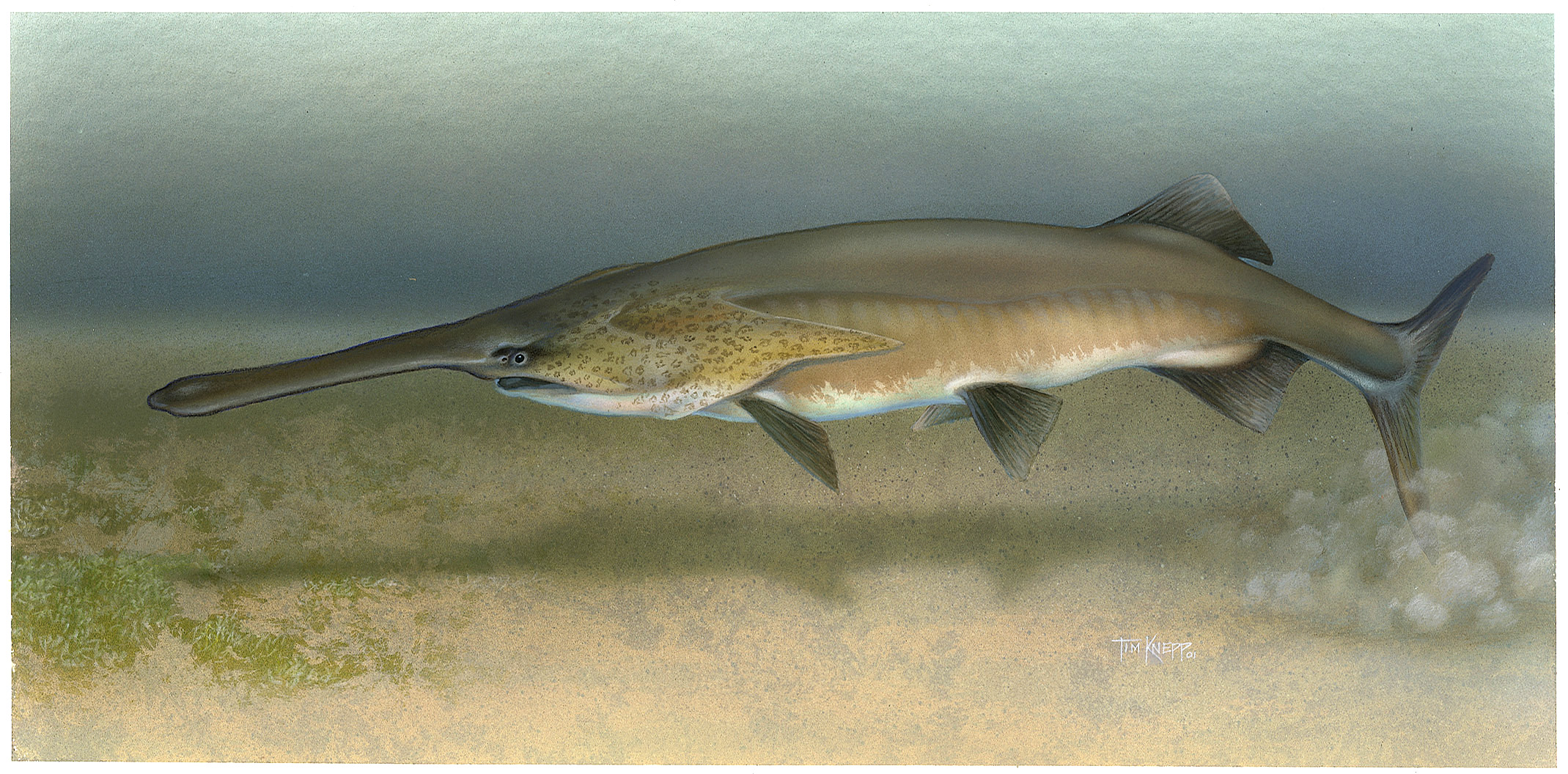
The paddlefish has a rostrum packed with electroreceptors.

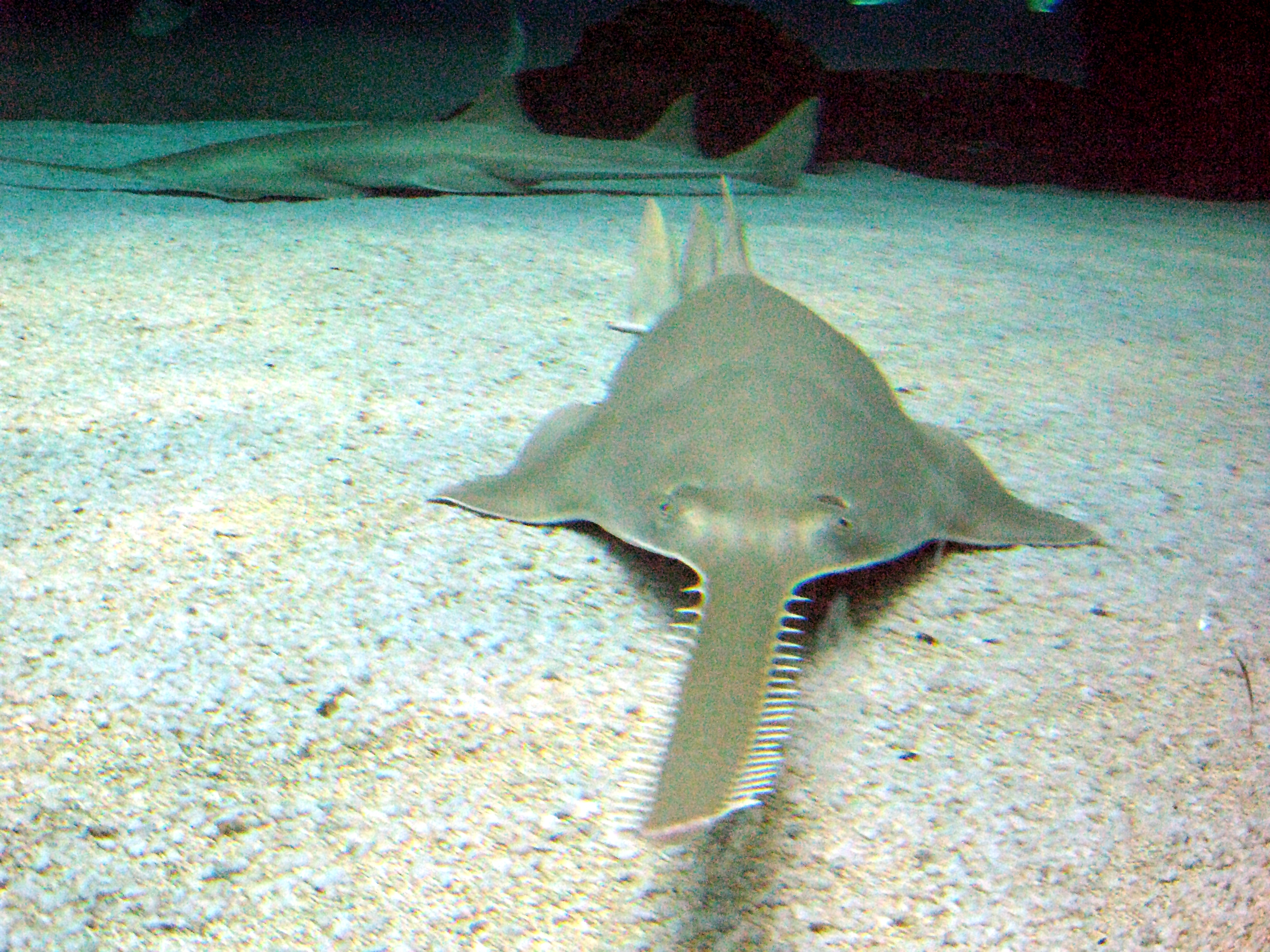
Sawfish have an electro-sensitive rostrum (saw) which is also used to slash at prey.

== See also ==
- Nostril – Nose orifice that enables the entry and exit of air
- Snout – Extended part of an animal's mouth
- Proboscis – Elongated mouth part
