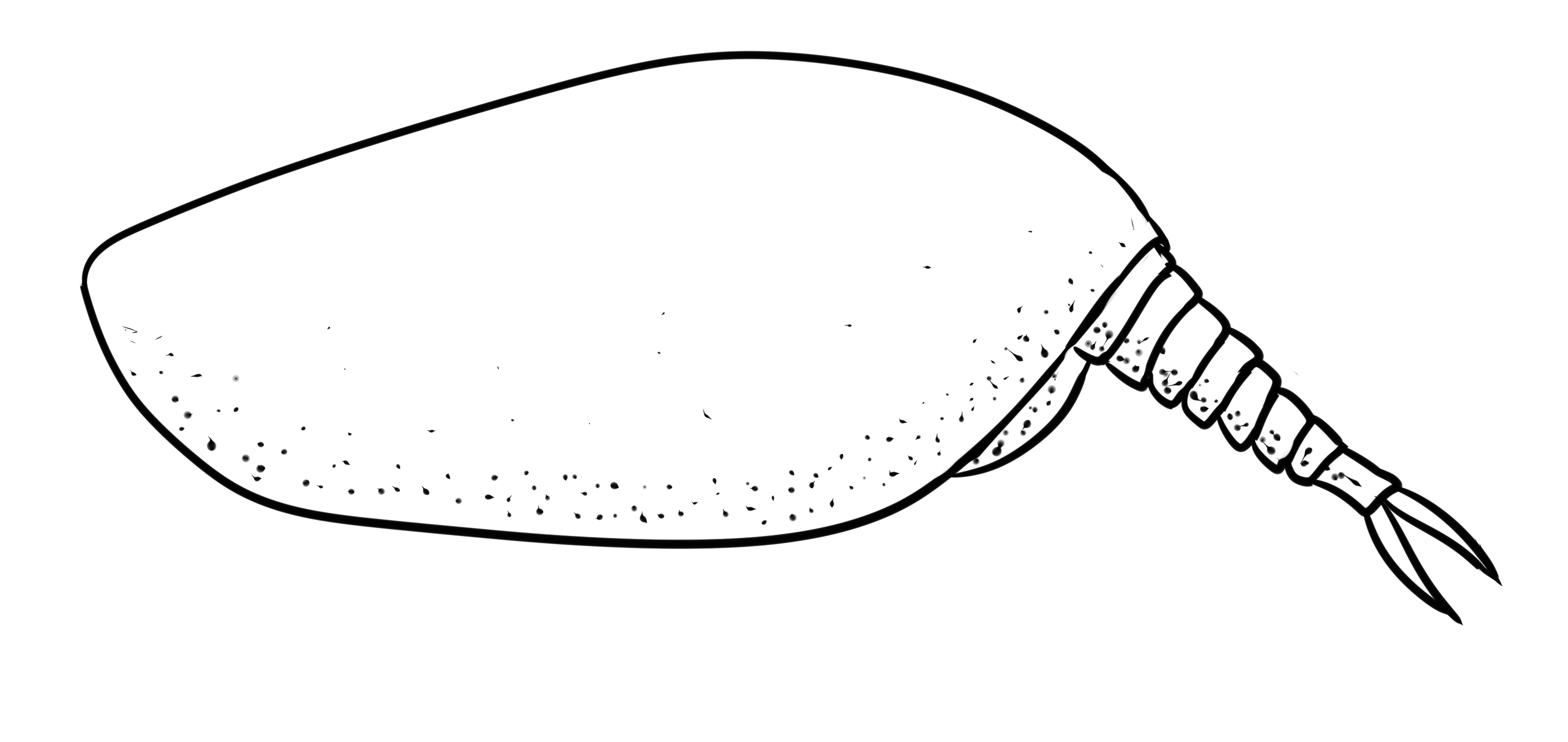

Scientific classification
- Kingdom: Animalia
- Phylum: Arthropoda
- Subphylum: Crustacea
- Genus: †Vladicaris; Chlupáč, 1995
- Species: †V. subtilis

Binomial name
- †Vladicaris subtilis Chlupáč, 1995

= Vladicaris =

Vladicaris Temporal range: Cambrian Stage 3

Extinct genus of crustaceans

Vladicaris is an arthropod known from the Lower Cambrian Paseky Shale member, Czech Republic, where it occurs alongside other arthropods, namely Kodymirus vagans and Kockurus grandis. It has been attributed to the Crustacea, and if it does indeed belong in the crown group of that subphylum, it would be the earliest known representative of the group. Its position within the Crustacea is unclear – it has been allied with the Phyllocarida and the Branchiopoda.

The organism has a segmented trunk and an elongate carapace – characters which have led to suggestions that it should be allied to the pectocaridids.
