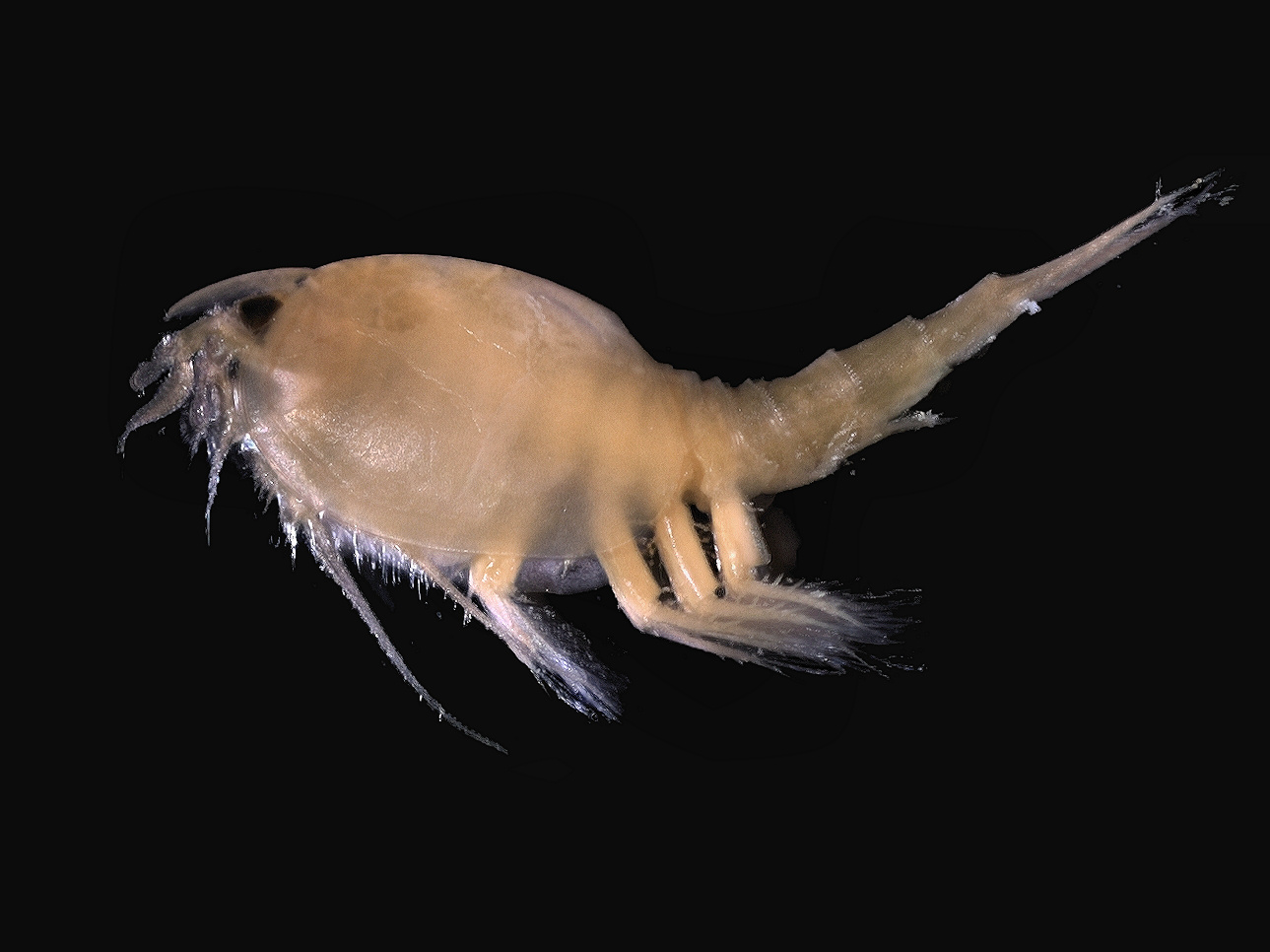
- Nebalia bipes

Scientific classification
- Kingdom: Animalia
- Phylum: Arthropoda
- Clade: Pancrustacea
- Class: Malacostraca
- Subclass: Phyllocarida; Packard, 1879

Orders
- †Archaeostraca; †Canadaspidida; †Hoplostraca; †Hymenostraca; Leptostraca

= Phyllocarida =

Phyllocarida Temporal range: 500–0 Ma

Subclass of crustaceans

Phyllocarida is a subclass of crustaceans, comprising the extant order Leptostraca and the extinct orders Hymenostraca and Archaeostraca. This clade of marine crustaceans diversified extensively during the Ordovician.

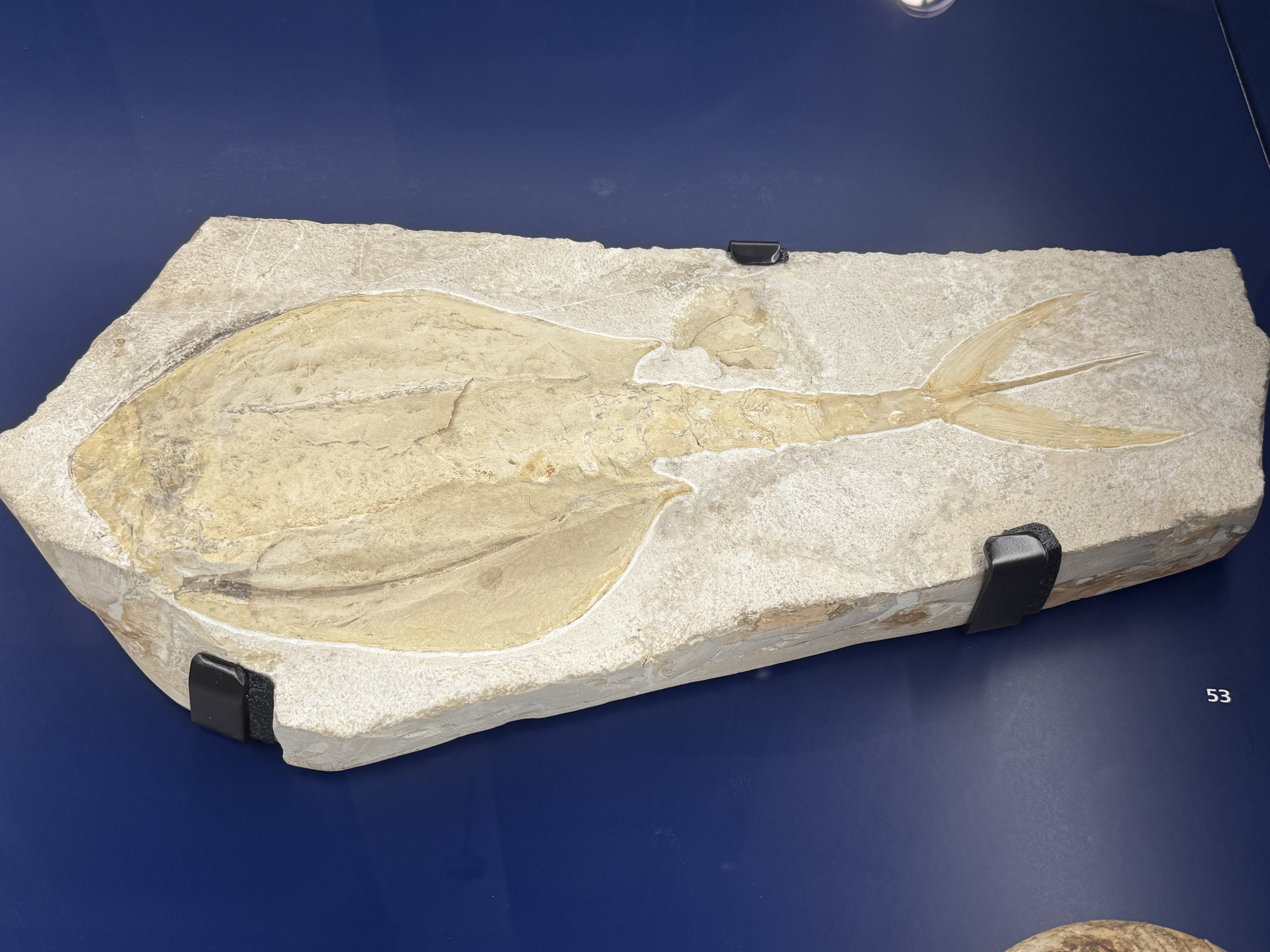
Undescribed fossil of a very large phyllocarid from the Yukon (Devonian)

== See also ==
- Arenosicaris
- Ceratiocaris
- Cinerocaris
- Vladicaris
