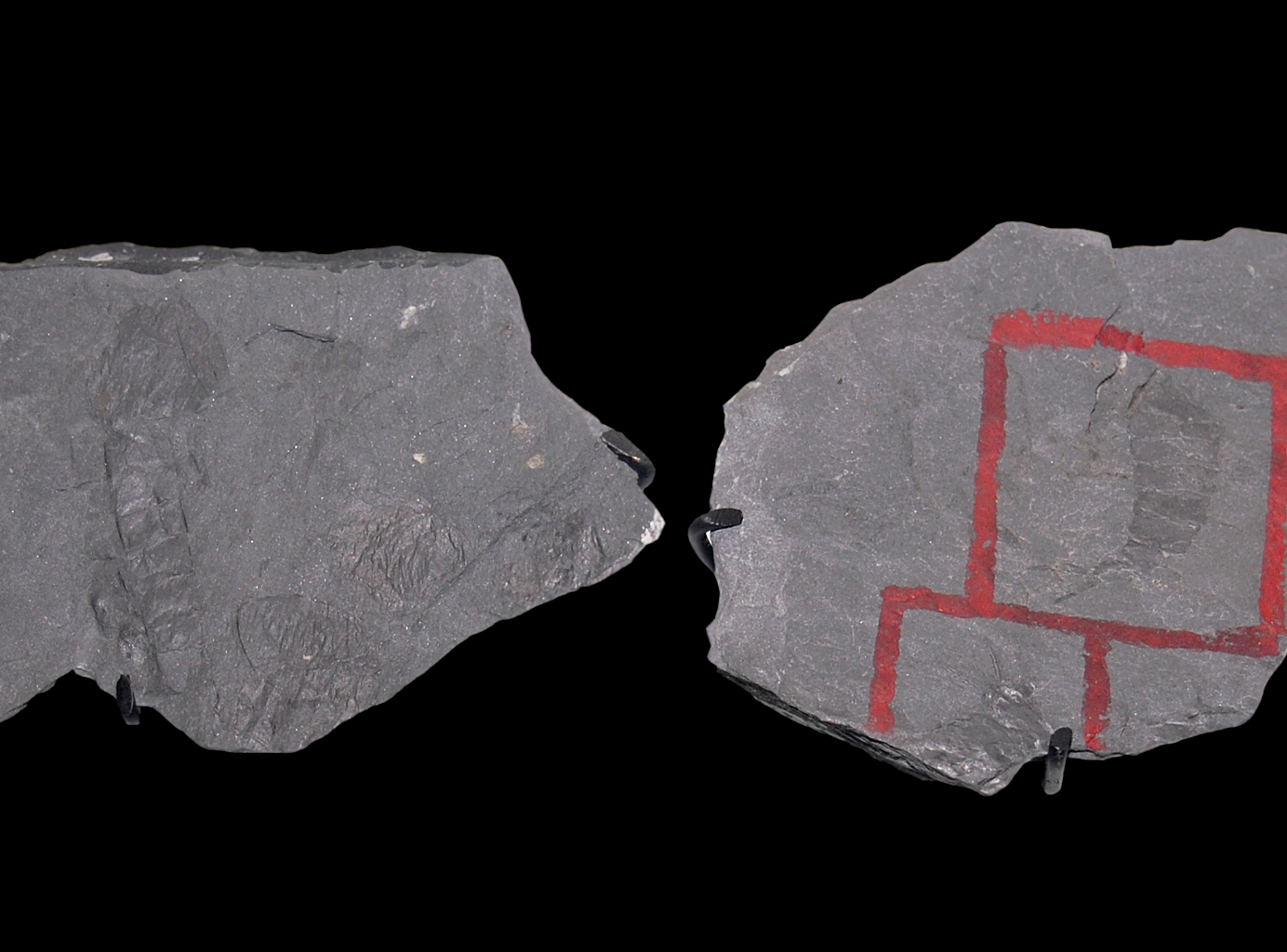
- Holotype (left) and paratype (right) specimens of Hymenocaris vermicaudata

Scientific classification
- Kingdom: Animalia
- Phylum: Arthropoda
- Clade: Pancrustacea
- Class: Malacostraca
- Subclass: Phyllocarida
- Order: †Hymenostraca; Rolfe, 1969
- Family: †Hymenocarididae; Haeckel, 1896
- Genus: †Hymenocaris; Salter, 1853
- Species: †H. vermicauda

Binomial name
- †Hymenocaris vermicauda Salter, 1853

= Hymenocaris =

Hymenocaris Temporal range: Late Cambrian, Furongian

Extinct genus of crustaceans

Hymenocaris is a genus of Cambrian marine arthropod. The type species, Hymenocaris vermicaudata is known from the Upper Cambrian (Furongian) Ffestiniog Formation, in North Wales, United Kingdom.

== Taxonomy ==
Hymenocaris and the type species, H. vermicaudata, were originally described in 1853 by John William Salter based on fossils found near Tremadog and Dolgellau in North Wales, which are now attributed to the upper Cambrian (Furongian) Ffestiniog Formation.

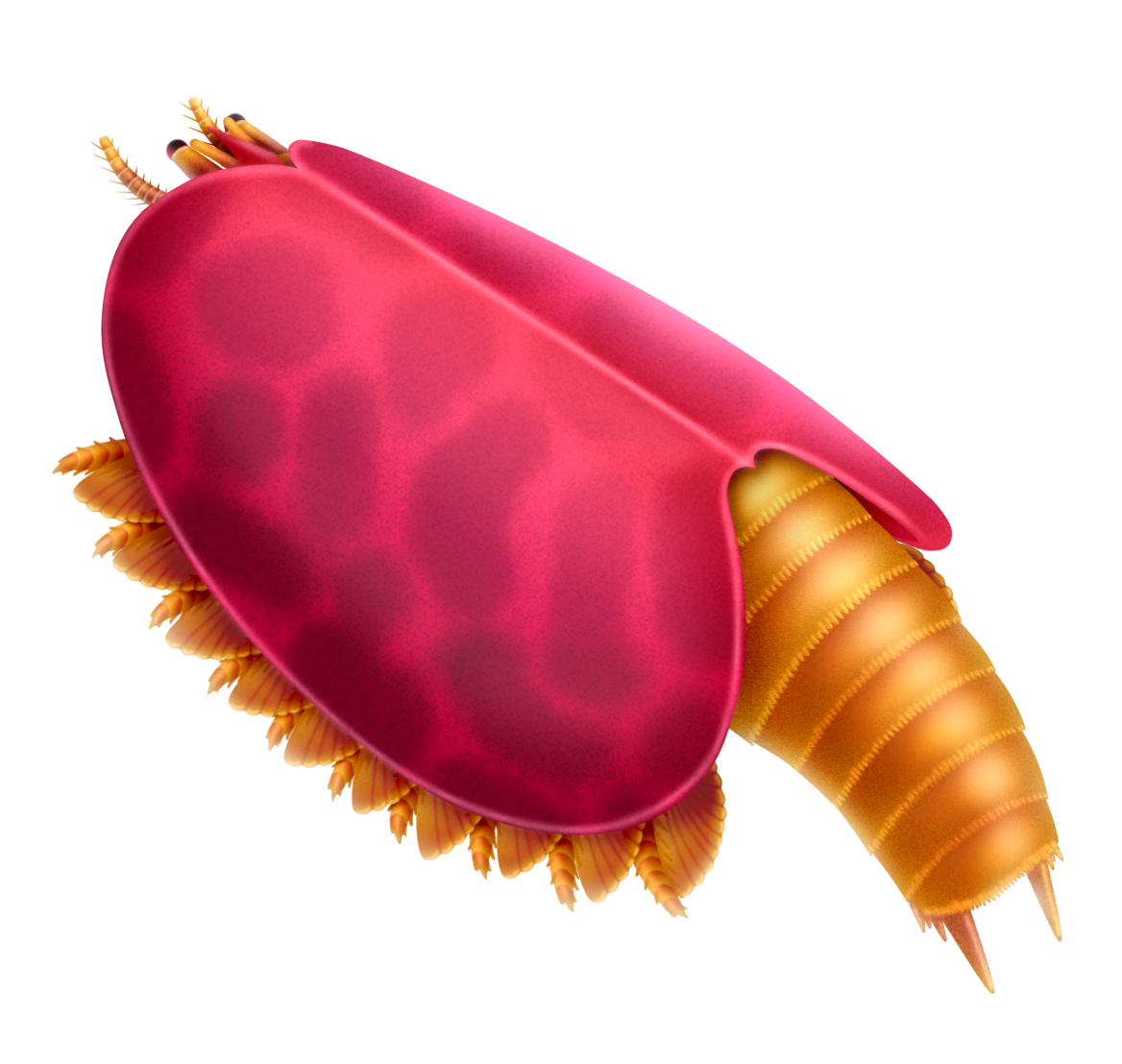
Reconstruction of Canadaspis perfecta, which was formerly attributed to Hymenocaris

Hymenocaris perfecta, described by Charles Doolittle Walcott in 1912 from the mid-Cambrian Burgess Shale of British Columbia, Canada was later reassigned to the genus Canadaspis, with remains assigned to other alleged Hymenocaris species from the same deposit, such as Hymenocaris ovalis and Hymenocaris obliqua now considered synonyms of Canadaspis perfecta. Hymenocaris salteri, originally named in 1861 based on fossils from Ordovician rocks in Victoria, Australia is now considered a synonym of the phyllocarid species Caryocaris wrighti.

Differences between Hymenocaris and Canadaspis have been used to justify erecting a separate order, Hymenostraca for Hymenocaris. In this publication, Hymenocaris proper was assigned to the crustacean subclass Phyllocarida. Due to species of Canadaspis being historically described as members of Hymenocaris, the clade Hymenocarina has been used for the clade containing Canadaspis and its close relatives, but notably Hymenocaris proper is not considered a member of Hymenocarina.
