= Nebaliella =

Scientific classification
- Domain: Eukaryota
- Kingdom: Animalia
- Phylum: Arthropoda
- Class: Malacostraca
- Order: Leptostraca
- Family: Nebaliidae
- Genus: Nebaliella; Thiele, 1904

Genus of crustaceans

Nebaliella is a genus of leptostracan crustaceans within the family Nebaliidae. There are currently 7 species assigned to the genus.

== Species ==
- Nebaliella antarctica Thiele, 1904
- Nebaliella brevicarinata Kikuchi & Gamô, 1992
- Nebaliella caboti Clark, 1932
- Nebaliella declivatas Walker-Smith, 1998
- Nebaliella extrema Thiele, 1905
- Nebaliella kurila Petryashov, 2016
- Nebaliella ochotica Petryashov, 2017
