= Nebaliopsis =

Scientific classification
- Domain: Eukaryota
- Kingdom: Animalia
- Phylum: Arthropoda
- Class: Malacostraca
- Order: Leptostraca
- Family: Nebaliopsididae
- Genus: Nebaliopsis
- Species: N. typica

Binomial name
- Nebaliopsis typica G. O. Sars, 1887

Genus of crustaceans

Nebaliopsis typica is a species of leptostracan crustacean, the only species in the genus Nebaliopsis. It is exceptionally large for a leptostracan, at up to 40 millimetres (1.6 in) in length, compared to 5–15 mm (0.2–0.6 in) for the other species. It is also the only species not to brood its eggs, but instead lays them directly into the water; correspondingly, there is no sexual dimorphism in Nebaliopsis.

In contrast to the other leptostracans, which are all benthic, Nebaliopsis has a wide pelagic distribution in the Southern Hemisphere, having been found off both coasts of South America, off Ghana and Côte d'Ivoire, in the south-western Indian Ocean, the south Pacific Ocean and in the Scotia Sea.
