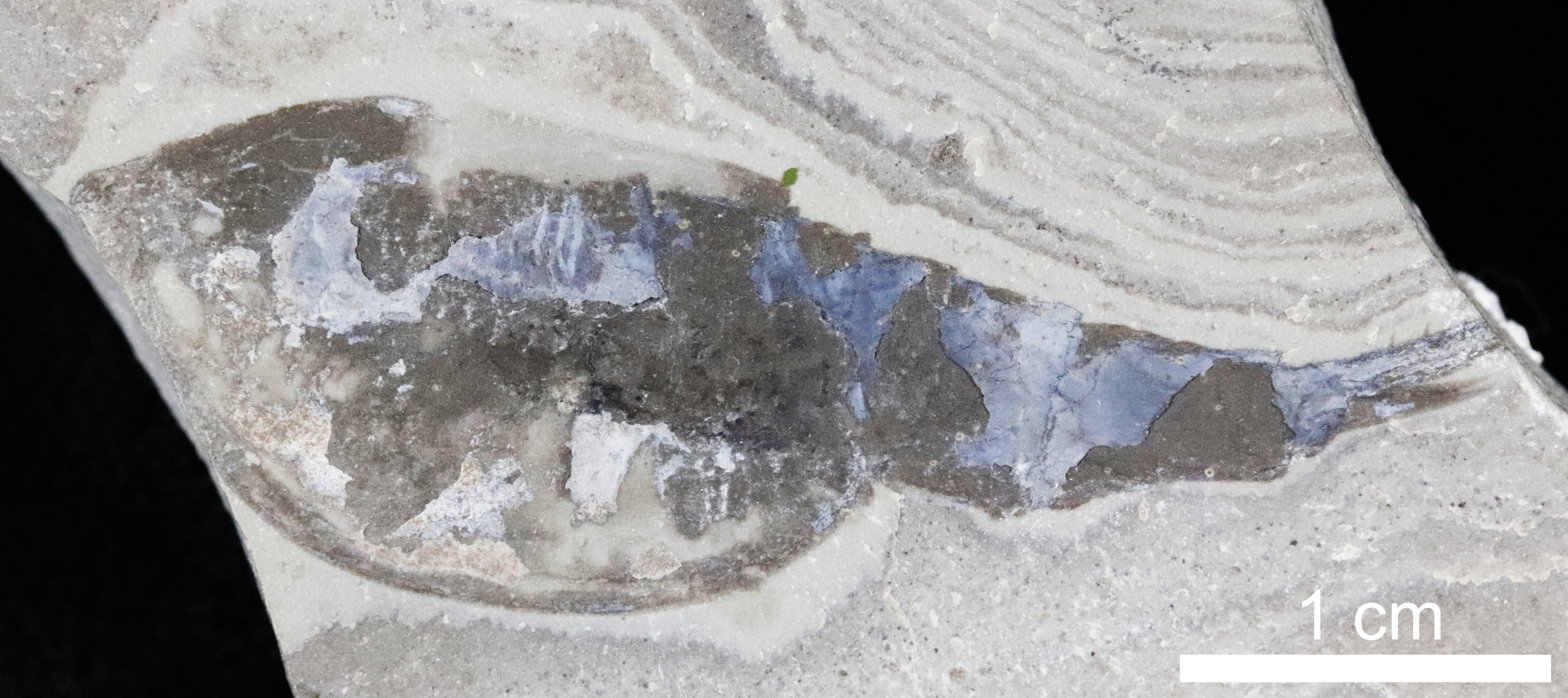
- Specimen of C. papilio from Waukesha Biota
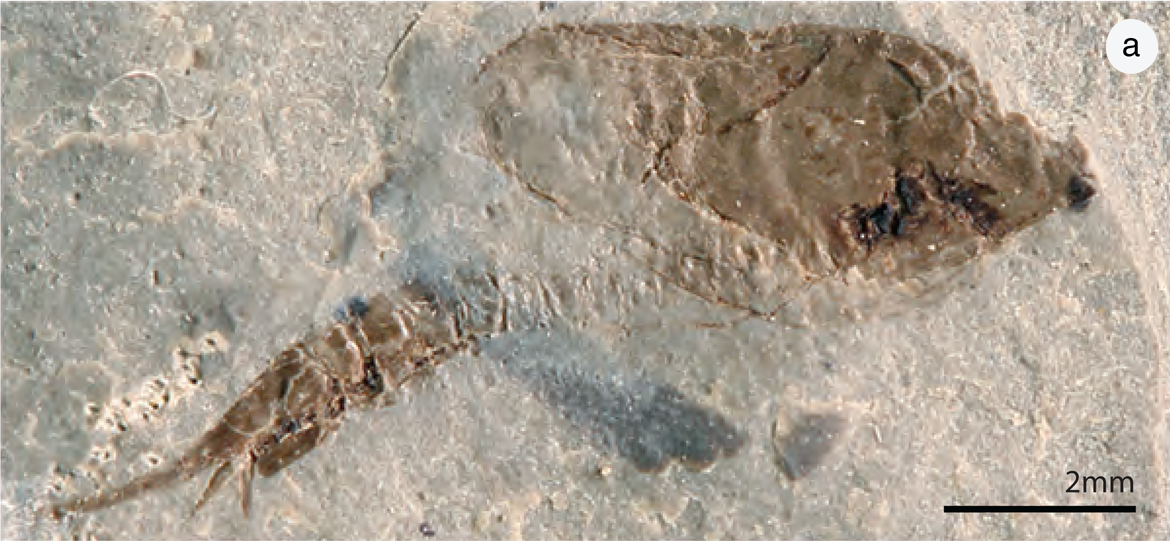
- Specimen of C. winneshiekensis from Winneshiek Shale

Scientific classification
- Kingdom: Animalia
- Phylum: Arthropoda
- Class: Malacostraca
- Subclass: Phyllocarida
- Order: †Archaeostraca
- Suborder: †Ceratiocaridina
- Family: †Ceratiocarididae
- Genus: †Ceratiocaris; M'Coy, 1849

Type species
- †Ceratiocaris solenoides M'Coy, 1849

Species
- See text.

= Ceratiocaris =

Ceratiocaris Temporal range: Tremadocian - Emsian 478.6–402.5 Ma

Extinct genus of crustaceans

Ceratiocaris is a genus of paleozoic phyllocarid crustaceans whose fossils are found in marine strata from the Upper Ordovician until the genus' extinction during the Silurian. They are typified by eight short thoracic segments, seven longer abdominal somites and an elongated pretelson somite. Their carapace is slightly oval shaped; they have many ridges parallel to the ventral margin and possess a horn at the anterior end. They are well known from the Silurian Eramosa formation of Ontario, Canada.

The following species are included:

- Ceratiocaris bohemica Barrande, 1872
- Ceratiocaris harpago Poschmann, Bergmann & Kühl, 2018
- Ceratiocaris macroura Collette & Rudkin, 2010
- Ceratiocaris monroei Salter in Murchison, 1859
- Ceratiocaris murchisoni Jones & Woodward, 1888
- Ceratiocaris papilio Salter in Murchison, 1859
- Ceratiocaris pusilla Matthew, 1889
- Ceratiocaris solenoides M'Coy, 1849
- Ceratiocaris winneshiekensis Briggs et al., 2016
