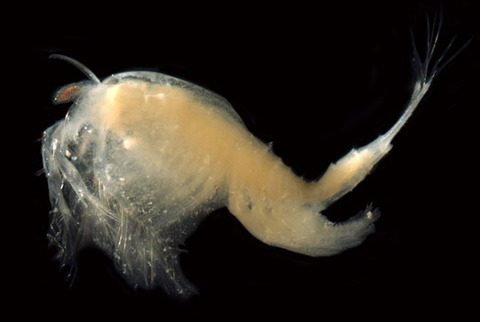

Scientific classification
- Domain: Eukaryota
- Kingdom: Animalia
- Phylum: Arthropoda
- Class: Malacostraca
- Order: Leptostraca
- Family: Paranebaliidae

= Paranebaliidae =

Family of crustaceans

Paranebaliidae is a family of crustaceans belonging to the order Leptostraca.

Genera:

- Levinebalia Walker-Smith, 2000
- Paranebalia Claus, 1880
- Saronebalia Haney & Martin, 2004
