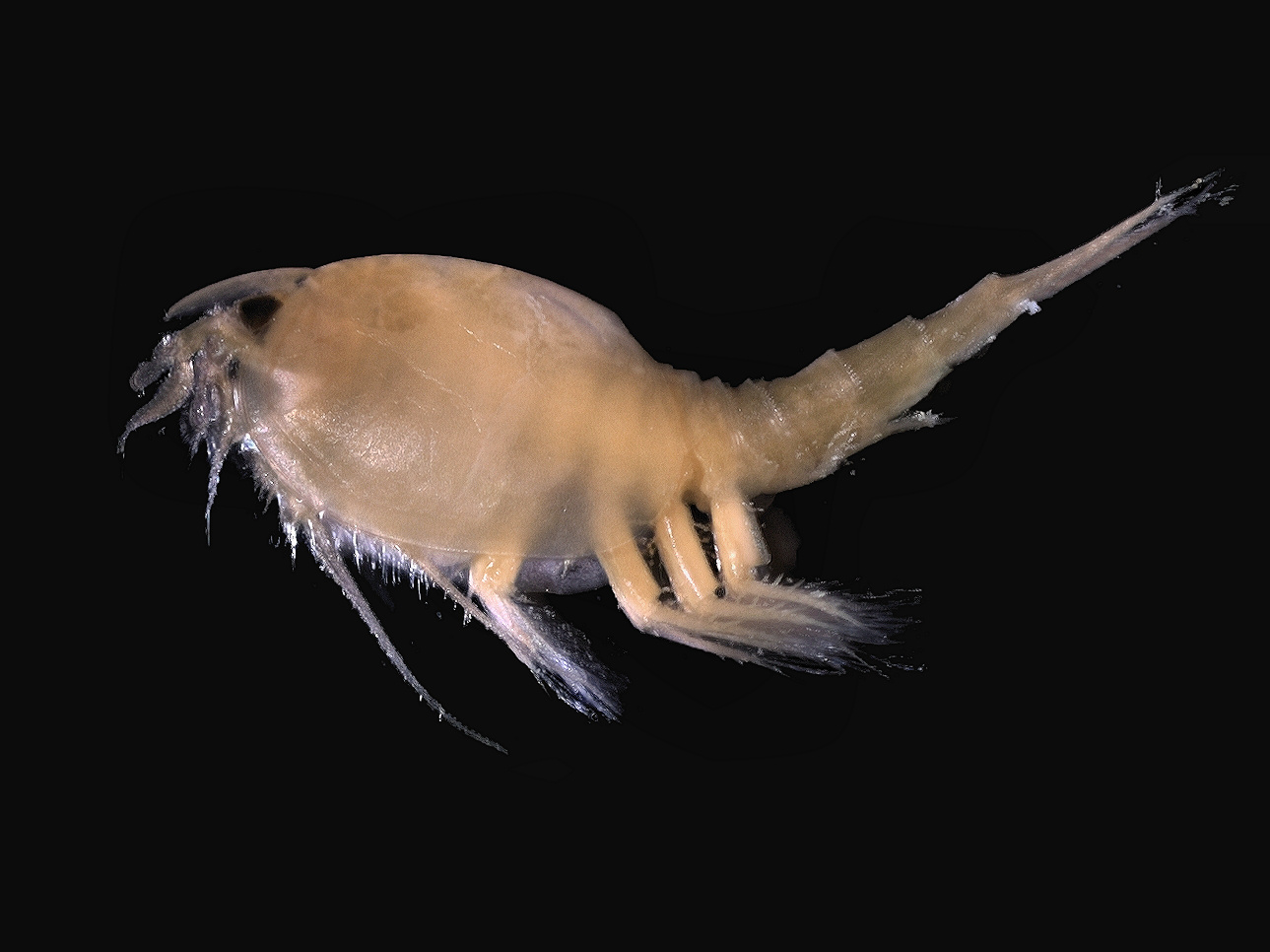
- Nebalia bipes

Scientific classification
- Kingdom: Animalia
- Phylum: Arthropoda
- Clade: Pancrustacea
- Class: Malacostraca
- Order: Leptostraca
- Family: Nebaliidae
- Genus: Nebalia; Leach, 1814

Type species
- Nebalia herbstii Leach, 1814

Species
- See text

= Nebalia =

Genus of crustaceans

Nebalia is a genus of small crustaceans. It contains many species; more than half of the species in the order Leptostraca,

== Taxonomy ==
Nebalia was first described by William Elford Leach in 1814.

=== Species ===
The genus contains over 30 species:

- Nebalia abyssicola Ledoyer, 1997
- Nebalia antarctica Dahl, 1990
- Nebalia biarticulata Ledoyer, 1997
- Nebalia bipes (Fabricius, 1780)
- Nebalia borealis Dahl, 1985
- Nebalia brucei Olesen, 1999
- Nebalia cannoni Dahl, 1990
- Nebalia capensis Barnard, 1914
- Nebalia clausi Dahl, 1985
- Nebalia dahli Kazmi & Tirmizi, 1989
- Nebalia daytoni Vetter, 1996
- Nebalia falklandensis Dahl, 1990
- Nebalia geoffroyi Milne-Edwards, 1928
- Nebalia gerkenae Haney & Martin, 2000
- Nebalia herbstii Leach, 1814
- Nebalia hessleri Martin, Vetter & Cash-Clark, 1996
- Nebalia ilheoensis Kensley, 1976
- Nebalia kensleyi Haney & Martin, 2005
- Nebalia kocatasi Moreira, Kocak & Katagan, 2007
- Nebalia lagartensis Escobar-Briones & Villalobos-Hiriart, 1995
- Nebalia longicornis Thomson, 1879
- Nebalia marerubri Wägele, 1983
- Nebalia melanophthalma Ledoyer, 2002
- Nebalia mortoni Lee & Bamber, 2011
- Nebalia neocaledoniensis Ledoyer, 2002
- Nebalia patagonica Dahl, 1990
- Nebalia reboredae Moreira & Urgorri, 2009
- Nebalia schizophthalma Haney, Hessler & Martin, 2001
- Nebalia strausi Risso, 1826
- Nebalia troncosoi Moreira, Cacabelos & Dominguez, 2003
- Nebalia villalobosi Ortiz, Winfield & Chazaro-Olvera, 2011

== Parasites ==
Nebalia species are the exclusive hosts of members the family Seisonidae, a distinct lineage of unusually structured rotifers.
