= Nebaliopsididae =

Scientific classification
- Kingdom: Animalia
- Phylum: Arthropoda
- Clade: Pancrustacea
- Class: Malacostraca
- Order: Leptostraca
- Suborder: Nebaliacea
- Family: Nebaliopsididae; Hessler, 1984

Genera
- Nebaliopsis; Pseudonebaliopsis

Synonyms
- Nebaliopsidae

Family of crustaceans

Nebaliopsididae is a family of leptostracan crustaceans. It contains only two species, the bathypelagic Nebaliopsis typica and the mesopelagic Pseudonebaliopsis atlantica.
