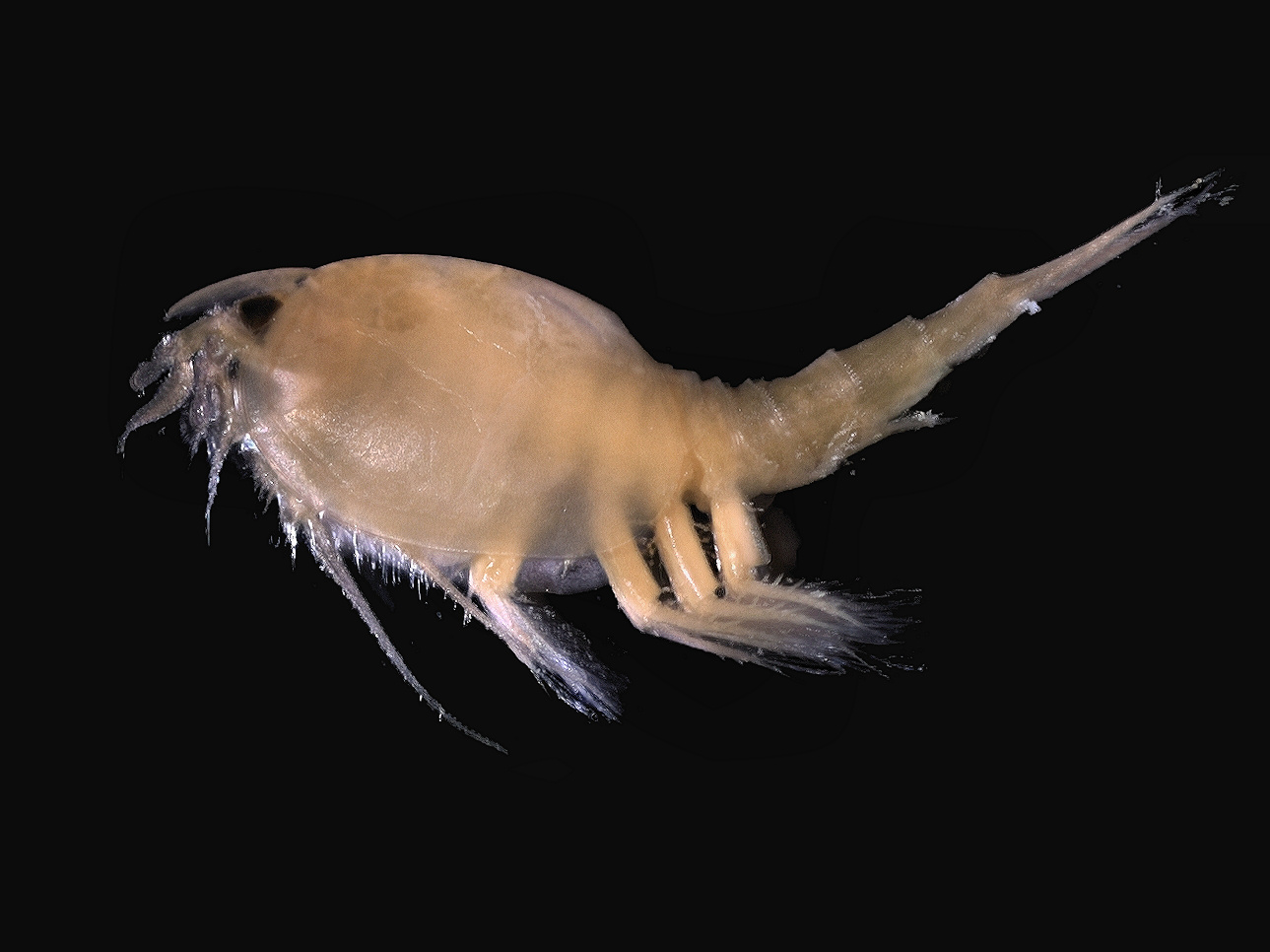

Scientific classification
- Domain: Eukaryota
- Kingdom: Animalia
- Phylum: Arthropoda
- Class: Malacostraca
- Order: Leptostraca
- Family: Nebaliidae
- Genus: Nebalia
- Species: N. bipes

Binomial name
- Nebalia bipes (O. Fabricius, 1780)

Synonyms
- Cancer bipes O. Fabricius, 1780

= Nebalia bipes =

Species of crustacean

Nebalia bipes is a species of leptostracan crustacean, and the first species in the order to have been described (in 1780, under the name Cancer bipes). It lives in coastal waters at depths of 5–60 m (20–200 ft), under stones or among decaying organic matter where it is common and sometimes abundant. Its predators include the fish Merlangius merlangus (whiting).

== Description ==
N. bipes is orange or yellowish green and about one centimetre long. It has a loosely attached thin shell composed of two halves joined longitudinally which protect most of the segments. The upper pair of antennae are stumpy and branched while the lower pair are much longer, especially in the male where they can be as long as the body. The eyes are red and on stalks and there is a rostral spine projecting forward between them. There are eight pairs of appendages concealed under the shell and four longer pairs of abdominal appendages half concealed. The tail continues with two further pairs of stubby appendages and ends in a fork.

Diagram of Nebalia bipes showing the major features of the external anatomy: 1: antennule; 2: rostrum; 3: carapace; 4: abdomen / pleon; 5: furca; 6: telson; 7: pleopods; 8: antenna; 9: thoracopods; 10: eye

== Distribution ==
N. bipes is found in the North Atlantic, from the east coast of North America, Greenland, Iceland, Faroe Islands, Norway, and south through the North Sea, Kattegat, around the British Isles, and extending into the Mediterranean Sea.
