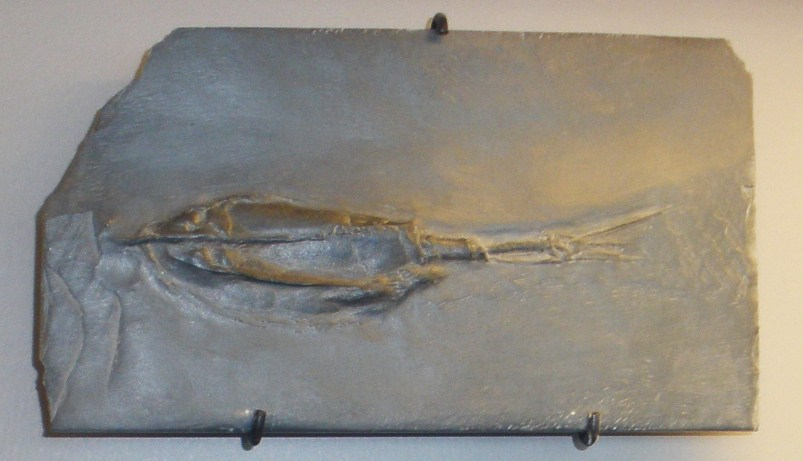
- Nahecaris stuertzi

Scientific classification
- Kingdom: Animalia
- Phylum: Arthropoda
- Class: Malacostraca
- Subclass: Phyllocarida
- Order: †Archaeostraca; Claus, 1888

Suborders
- †Caryocaridina; †Ceratiocaridina; †Echinocaridina; †Palaeopemphida; †Pephricaridina; †Rhinocaridina

= Archaeostraca =

Archaeostraca Temporal range: Late Cambrian–Upper Triassic

Extinct order of crustaceans

Archaeostraca is an extinct order of crustaceans in the subclass Phyllocarida. It first appeared in the Late Cambrian and became very diverse in both the Late Silurian and the Devonian.
